= McDonnell Douglas F-4 Phantom II =

Fighter aircraft family developed from 1958

F-4 Phantom II
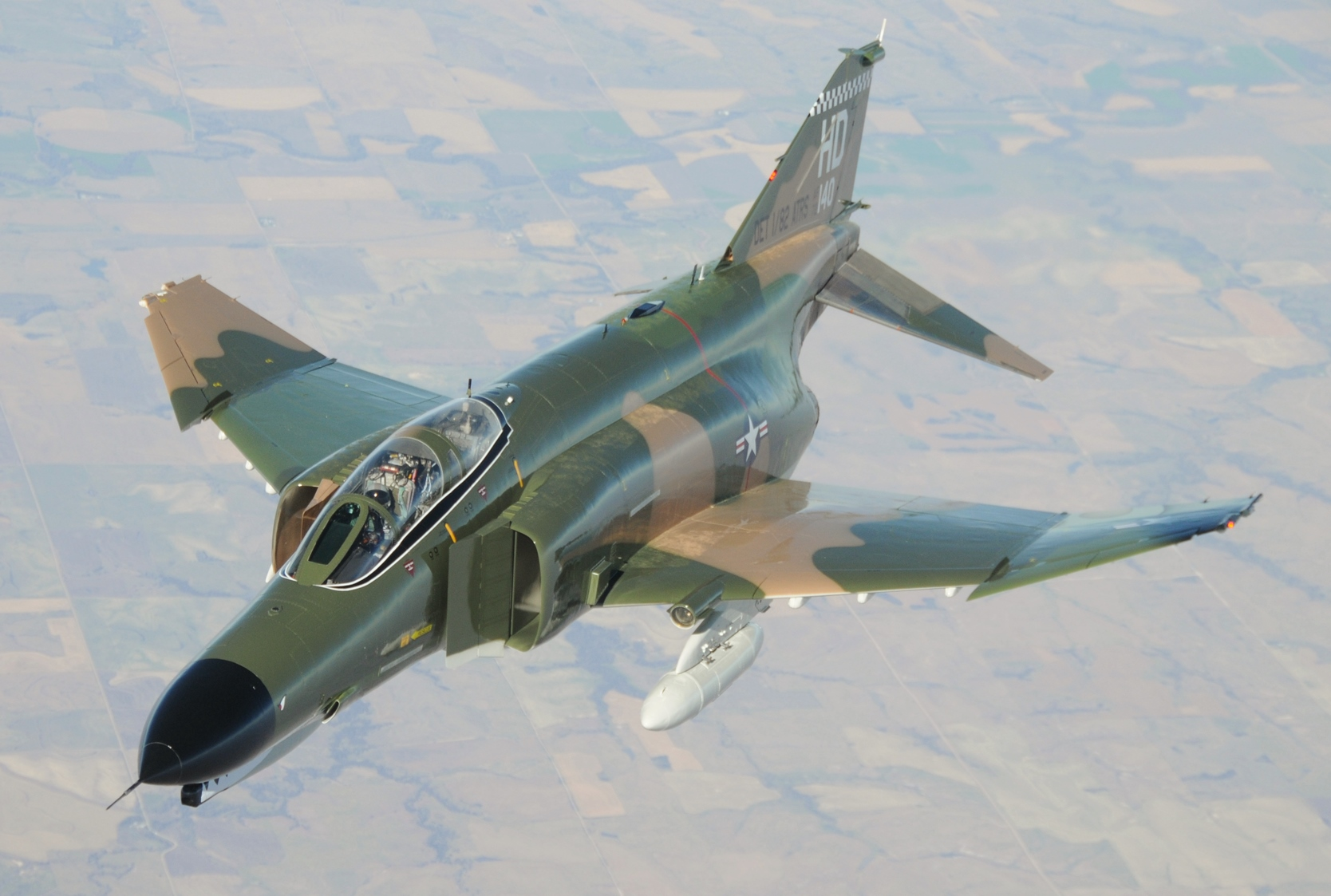
- A U.S. Air Force QF-4E flies with the 82nd Aerial Targets Squadron over White Sands Missile Range in 2008

General information
- Type: Interceptor, fighter-bomber
- National origin: United States
- Manufacturer: McDonnell Aircraft Corporation; McDonnell Douglas
- Status: In limited service
- Primary users: United States Air Force (historical): United States Navy (historical); United States Marine Corps (historical); Hellenic Air Force
- Number built: 5,195

History
- Manufactured: 1958–1981
- Introduction date: 30 December 1960; 65 years ago
- First flight: 27 May 1958; 68 years ago
- Retired: 1986 (USN); 1996 (U.S. combat use); 2004 (Israel); 2013 (Germany); 2016 (U.S. target drone); 2021 (Japan); 2024 (South Korea)
- Variant: McDonnell Douglas Phantom FG.1/FGR.2

The McDonnell Douglas F-4 Phantom II (Note: The aircraft was originally designated the AH, and later redesignated F4H, by the United States Navy, while the U.S. Air Force's original designation was "F-110A Spectre". The F-4 designation came about in the 1962 United States Tri-Service aircraft designation system for all branches of the U.S. military, unified by the order of U.S. Defense Secretary Robert McNamara. Within McDonnell Aircraft, the F-4 was referred to as Model 98.) is an American tandem two-seat, twin-engined, all-weather, long-range supersonic jet interceptor and fighter-bomber that was developed by McDonnell Aircraft for the United States Navy. It entered service with the Navy in 1961, then was adopted by the United States Marine Corps and the United States Air Force, and within a few years became a major part of their air arms. In total, 5,195 Phantoms were built from 1958 to 1981, making it the most-produced American supersonic military aircraft in history and a signature combat aircraft of the Cold War.

The Phantom is a large fighter with a top speed over Mach 2.2. It can carry more than 18,000 pounds (8,200 kg) of weapons on nine external hardpoints, including air-to-air missiles, air-to-ground missiles, and various bombs. Like some other interceptors of its time, the F-4 was initially designed without an internal cannon, but some later models incorporated an internal M61 Vulcan rotary cannon. Beginning in 1959, it set 15 world records for in-flight performance, including an absolute speed record and an absolute altitude record.

The F-4 was used extensively during the Vietnam War, first as the principal air superiority fighter for the U.S. Air Force (USAF), Navy (USN), and Marine Corps (USMC), and later as a ground-attack and aerial reconnaissance aircraft. During the Vietnam War, all five American servicemen who became aces – one USAF pilot and two weapon systems officers (WSOs), one USN pilot, and one radar intercept officer (RIO) – did so in F-4s. The Phantom remained a major part of U.S. military air power into the 1980s, when it was gradually replaced by more modern aircraft such as the F-15 Eagle and F-16 Fighting Falcon in the USAF, the F-14 Tomcat in the USN, and the F/A-18 Hornet in the USN and USMC.

The F-4G Phantom was used for reconnaissance and Wild Weasel (Suppression of Enemy Air Defenses) missions in the 1991 Gulf War, and finally left combat service in 1996. It was the only aircraft used by both U.S. flight-demonstration teams: the USAF Thunderbirds (F-4E) and the USN Blue Angels (F-4J). The F-4 was also operated by the armed forces of 11 other nations. Israeli Phantoms saw extensive combat in several Arab–Israeli conflicts, while Iran used its large fleet of Phantoms, acquired before the fall of the Shah, in the Iran–Iraq War. The F-4 remains in active service with the Hellenic Air Force and the Turkish Air Force. Turkey's most recently upgraded F-4E Terminator variant is to remain in service until at least 2030.

== Development ==
=== Origins ===
In 1952, McDonnell's chief of aerodynamics, Dave Lewis, was appointed by CEO Jim McDonnell to be the company's preliminary design manager. With no new aircraft competitions on the horizon, internal studies concluded the Navy had the greatest need for a new and different aircraft type, an attack fighter.

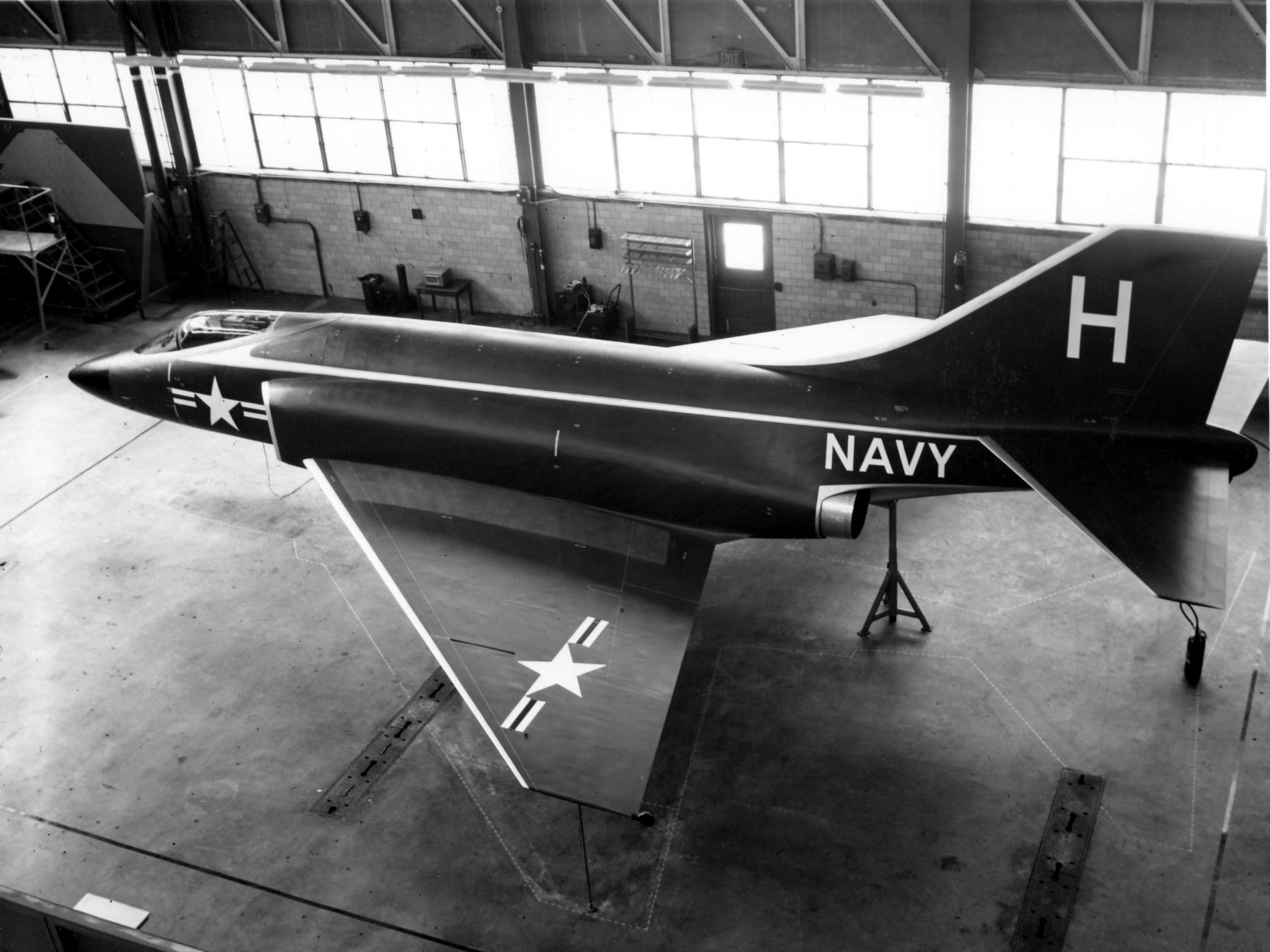
The McDonnell F3H-G/H mockup, 1954

In 1953, McDonnell Aircraft began work on revising its F3H Demon naval fighter, seeking expanded capabilities and better performance. The company developed several projects, including a variant powered by a Wright J67 engine, and variants powered by two Wright J65 engines, or two General Electric J79 engines. The J79-powered version promised a top speed of Mach 1.97. On 19 September 1953, McDonnell approached the USN with a proposal for the "Super Demon". Uniquely, the aircraft was to be modular, as it could be fitted with one- or two-seat noses for different missions, with different nose cones to accommodate radar, photo cameras, four 20 mm (.79 in) cannons, or 56 FFAR unguided rockets in addition to the nine hardpoints under the wings and the fuselage. The Navy was sufficiently interested to order a full-scale mock-up of the F3H-G/H, but felt that the upcoming Grumman XF9F-9 and Vought XF8U-1 already satisfied the need for a supersonic fighter.

The McDonnell design was therefore reworked into an all-weather fighter-bomber with 11 external hardpoints for weapons, and on 18 October 1954, the company received a letter of intent for two YAH-1 prototypes. Then on 26 May 1955, four USN officers arrived at the McDonnell offices, and within an hour, presented the company with an entirely new set of requirements. Because the Navy already had the Douglas A-4 Skyhawk for ground attack and F-8 Crusader for dogfighting, the project now had to fulfill the need for an all-weather fleet defense interceptor. A second crewman was added to operate the powerful radar; designers believed that air combat in the next war would overload solo pilots with information.

=== XF4H-1 prototype ===
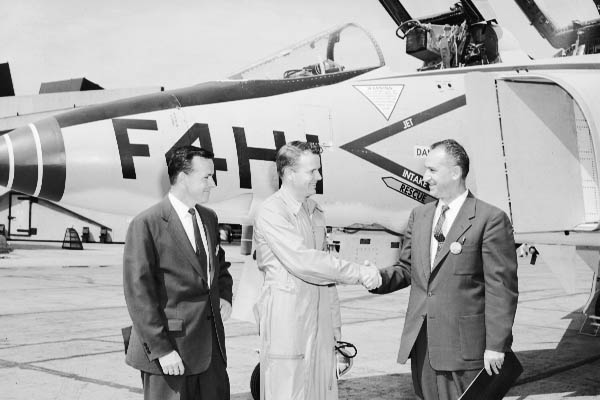
Key figures in the F-4 development: David Lewis, Robert Little, and Herman Barkey

The XF4H-1 was designed to carry four semirecessed AAM-N-6 Sparrow III radar-guided missiles and to be powered by two J79-GE-8 engines. As in the McDonnell F-101 Voodoo, the engines sat low in the fuselage to maximize internal fuel capacity and ingested air through fixed-geometry intakes. The thin-section wing had a leading edge sweep of 45° and was equipped with blown flaps for better low-speed handling.

Wind tunnel testing had revealed lateral instability, requiring the addition of 5° dihedral to the wings. To avoid redesigning the titanium central section of the aircraft, McDonnell engineers angled up only the outer portions of the wings by 12°, which averaged to the required 5° over the entire wingspan. The wings also received the distinctive "dogtooth" for improved control at high angles of attack. The all-moving tailplane was given 23° of anhedral to improve control at high angles of attack, while still keeping the tailplane clear of the engine exhaust. In addition, air intakes were equipped with one fixed ramp and one variable-geometry ramp with angle scheduled to give maximum pressure recovery between Mach 1.4 and Mach 2.2. Airflow matching between the inlet and engine was achieved by bypassing the engine as secondary air into the exhaust nozzle. All-weather intercept capability was achieved with the AN/APQ-50 radar. To meet requirements for carrier operations, the landing gear was designed to withstand landings with a maximum sink rate of 23 ft/s (7 m/s), while the nose strut could extend by 20 in (51 cm) to increase angle of attack on the catapult portion of a takeoff.

The F4H Navy Fighter (1960) official McDonnell promotional film reel

On 25 July 1955, the USN ordered two XF4H-1 test aircraft and five YF4H-1 preproduction examples. The Phantom made its maiden flight on 27 May 1958 with Robert C. Little at the controls. A hydraulic problem precluded the retraction of the landing gear, but subsequent flights went more smoothly. Early testing resulted in redesign of the air intakes, including the distinctive addition of 12,500 holes to "bleed off" the slow-moving boundary layer air from the surface of each intake ramp. Series production aircraft also featured splitter plates to divert the boundary layer away from the engine intakes. The aircraft was soon in competition with the XF8U-3 Crusader III. Due to cockpit workload, the USN wanted a two-seat aircraft, and on 17 December 1958, the F4H was declared the winner. Delays with the J79-GE-8 engines meant that the first-production aircraft were fitted with J79-GE-2 and −2A engines, each having 16,100 lbf (71.8 kN) of afterburning thrust. In 1959, the Phantom began carrier suitability trials with the first complete launch-recovery cycle performed on 15 February 1960 from Independence.

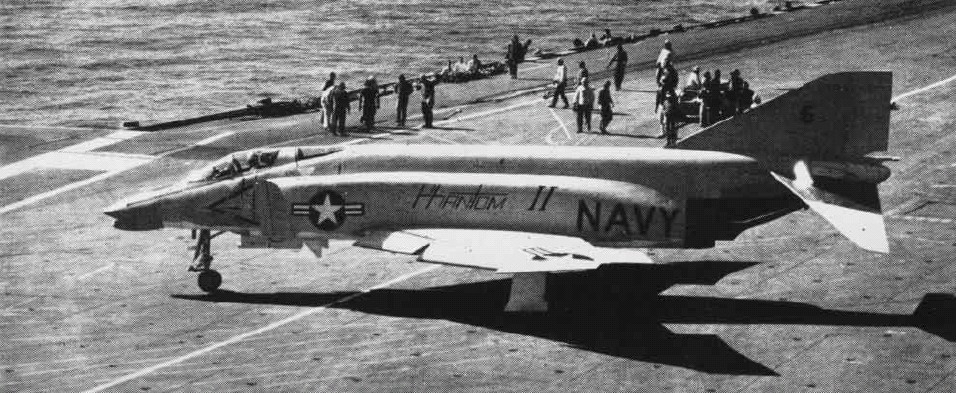
An F4H-1F aboard Independence, April 1960

Proposals were made to name the F4H "Satan" and "Mithras". In the end, the aircraft was given the less-controversial name "Phantom II", the first "Phantom" being another McDonnell jet fighter, the FH-1 Phantom. The Phantom II was briefly given the designation F-110A and named "Spectre" by the USAF and the Tri-Service aircraft designation system, F-4, was adopted in September 1962.

=== Production ===
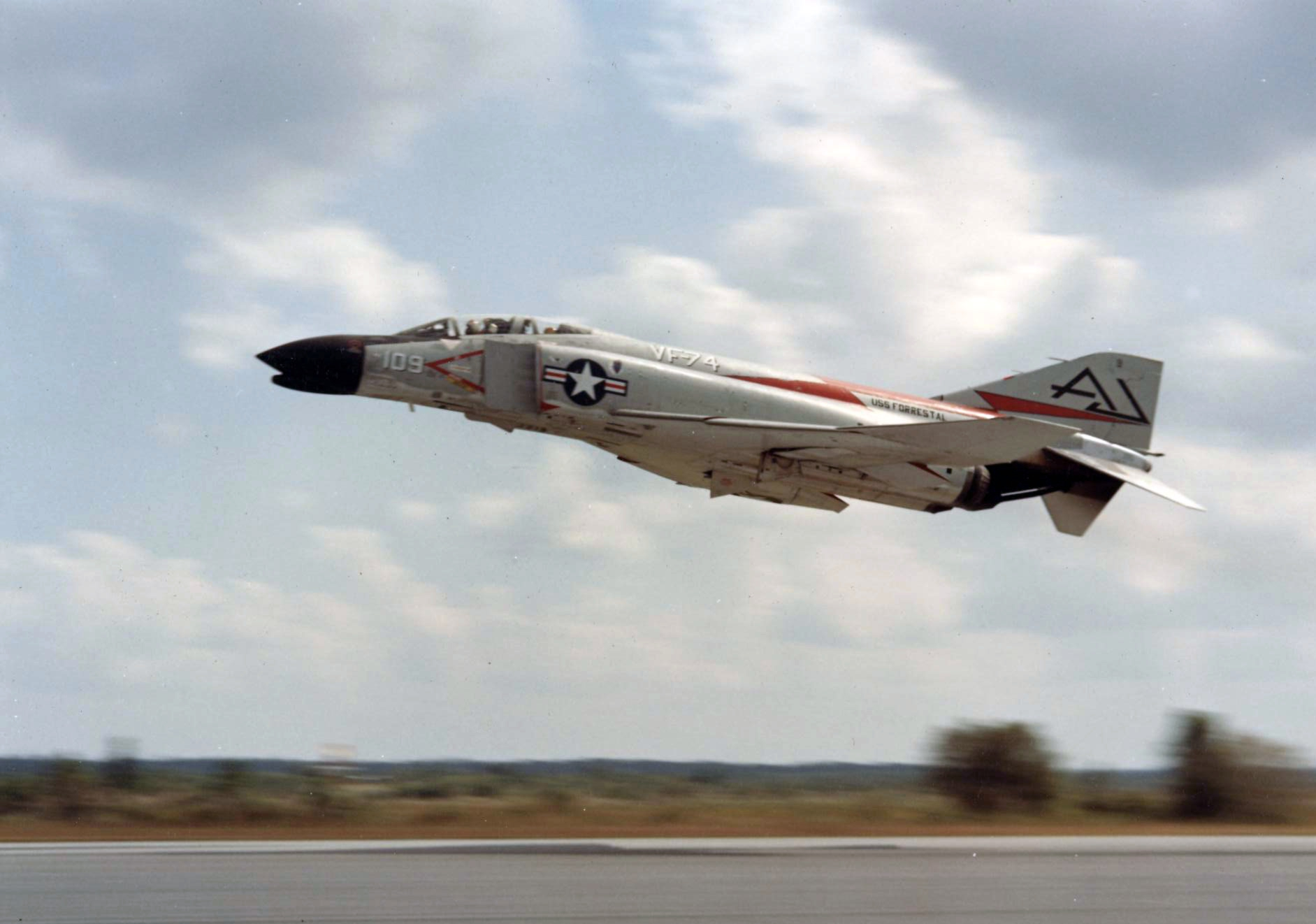
In 1961, VF-74 became the first operational USN Phantom squadron

Early in production, the radar was upgraded to the Westinghouse AN/APQ-72, an AN/APQ-50 with a larger radar antenna, necessitating the bulbous nose, and the canopy was reworked to improve visibility and make the rear cockpit less cramped. During its career, the Phantom underwent many changes in the form of numerous variants developed.

The USN operated the F4H-1 (redesignated F-4A in 1962) with J79-GE-2 and -2A engines of 16,100 lbf (71.62 kN) thrust and later builds receiving -8 engines. In total, 45 F-4As were built; none saw combat, and most ended up as test or training aircraft. The USN and USMC received the first definitive Phantom, the F-4B, which was equipped with the Westinghouse APQ-72 radar (pulse only), a Texas Instruments AN/AAA-4 infrared search and track pod under the nose, and an AN/AJB-3 bombing system, and powered by J79-GE-8,-8A, and -8B engines of 10,900 lbf (48.5 kN) dry and 16,950 lbf (75.4 kN) afterburner (reheat) with the first flight on 25 March 1961; 649 F-4Bs were built with deliveries beginning in 1961 and VF-121 Pacemakers receiving the first examples at NAS Miramar.

The USAF received Phantoms as the result of Defense Secretary Robert McNamara's push to create a unified fighter for all branches of the US military. After an F-4B won the "Operation Highspeed" fly-off against the Convair F-106 Delta Dart, the USAF borrowed two USN F-4Bs, temporarily designating them F-110A in January 1962, and developed requirements for their own version. Unlike the USN's focus on air-to-air interception in the Fleet Air Defense mission, the USAF emphasized both an air-to-air and an air-to-ground fighter-bomber role. With McNamara's unification of designations on 18 September 1962, the Phantom became the F-4 with the naval version designated F-4B and USAF F-4C. The first USAF Phantom flew on 27 May 1963, exceeding Mach 2 on its maiden flight.

The F-4J improved both air-to-air and ground-attack capability; deliveries began in 1966 and ended in 1972 with 522 built. It was equipped with J79-GE-10 engines with 17,844 lbf (79.374 kN) thrust, the Westinghouse AN/AWG-10 fire-control system (making the F-4J the first fighter in the world with operational look-down/shoot-down capability), a new integrated missile control system and the AN/AJB-7 bombing system for expanded ground attack capability.

1960 USN F-4 Phantom promotional film, with foreword by test pilot Bob Little

The F-4N (updated F-4Bs) with smokeless engines and F-4J aerodynamic improvements started in 1972 under a USN-initiated refurbishment program called Project Bee Line, with 228 converted by 1978. The F-4S model resulted from the refurbishment of 265 F-4Js with J79-GE-17 smokeless engines of 17,900 lbf (79.379 kN), AWG-10B radar with digitized circuitry for improved performance and reliability, Honeywell AN/AVG-8 visual target acquisition set (world's first operational helmet sighting system), classified avionics improvements, airframe reinforcement, and leading-edge slats for enhanced maneuvering. The USMC also operated the RF-4B with reconnaissance cameras, with 46 built; the RF-4B flew alone and unarmed, with a requirement to fly straight and level at 5,000 feet while taking photographs. They relied on the shortcomings of the antiaircraft defenses to survive, as they were unable to make evasive maneuvers.

Phantom II production ended in the United States in 1979 after 5,195 had been built (5,057 by McDonnell Douglas and 138 in Japan by Mitsubishi). Of these, 2,874 went to the USAF, 1,264 to the USN and USMC, and the rest to foreign customers. The last U.S.-built F-4 went to South Korea, while the last F-4 built was an F-4EJ built by Mitsubishi Heavy Industries in Japan and delivered on 20 May 1981. As of 2008, 631 Phantoms were in service worldwide, while the Phantoms were in use as a target drone (specifically QF-4Cs) operated by the U.S. military until 21 December 2016, when the USAF officially ended use of the type. The numbers in Iran have decreased after Israeli bombing during the 2026 war destroyed at least one F-4 at Iran's Tabriz Airbase, and many at Iran's 3rd Tactical Airbase in Hamadan Province.

=== World records ===
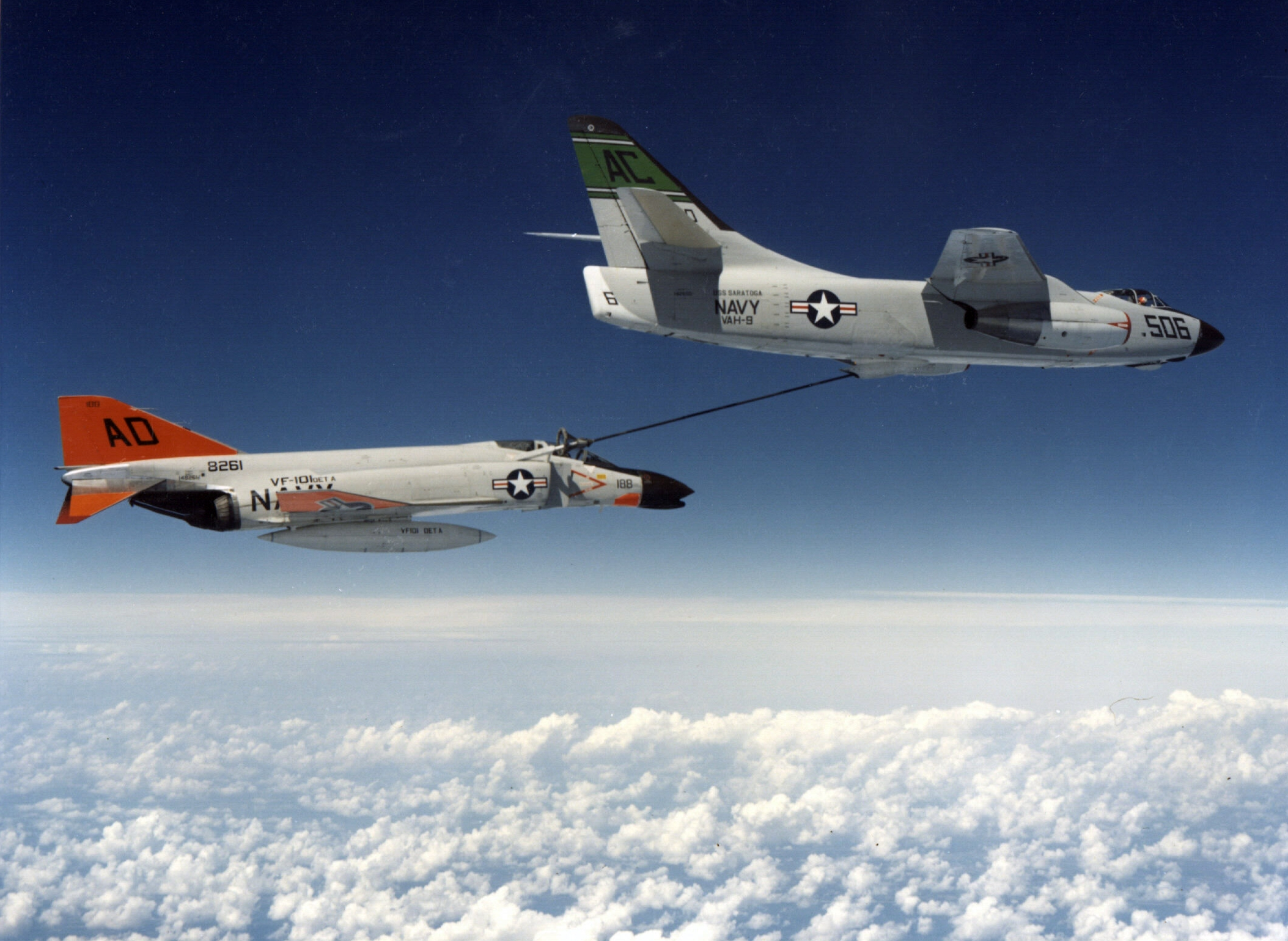
Transcontinental "Operation LANA" in 1961

To show off their new fighter, the USN led a series of record-breaking flights early in Phantom development: All in all, the Phantom set 16 world records. Five of the speed records remained unbeaten until the F-15 Eagle appeared in 1975.

- Operation Top Flight: On 6 December 1959, the second XF4H-1 performed a zoom climb to a world-record 98,557 ft (30,040 m). Commander Lawrence E. Flint Jr., USN accelerated his aircraft to Mach 2.5 (2,660 km/h; 1,650 mph) at 47,000 ft (14,330 m) and climbed to 90,000 ft (27,430 m) at a 45° angle. He then shut down the engines and glided to the peak altitude. As the aircraft fell through 70,000 ft (21,300 m), Flint restarted the engines and resumed normal flight.
- On 5 September 1960, an F4H-1 averaged 1,216.78 mph (1,958.16 km/h) over a 500 km (311 mi), closed-circuit course.
- On 25 September 1960, an F4H-1F averaged 1,390.24 mph (2,237.37 km/h) over a 100 km (62.1 mi), closed-circuit course. FAIRecord File Number 8898.
- Operation LANA: To celebrate the 50th anniversary of naval aviation (L is the Roman numeral for 50 and ANA stood for Anniversary of Naval Aviation) on 24 May 1961, Phantoms flew across the continental United States in under three hours and included several tanker refuelings. The fastest of the aircraft averaged 869.74 mph (1,400.28 km/h) and completed the trip in 2 hours 47 minutes, earning the pilot (and future NASA astronaut), Lieutenant Richard Gordon, USN and RIO, Lieutenant Bobbie Young, USN, the 1961 Bendix Trophy.
- Operation Sageburner: On 28 August 1961, a F4H-1F Phantom II averaged 902.714 mph (1,452.777 km/h) over a 3 mi (4.82 km) course flying below 125 feet (38.1 m) at all times. Commander J.L. Felsman, USN, was killed during the first attempt at this record on 18 May 1961 when his aircraft disintegrated in the air after a pitch damper failure.
- Operation Skyburner: On 22 November 1961, a modified Phantom with water injection, piloted by Lt. Col. Robert B. Robinson, set an absolute world record average speed over a 20-mile-long (32.2 km) two-way straight course of 1,606.342 mph (2,585.086 km/h).
- On 5 December 1961, another Phantom set a sustained altitude record of 66,443.8 feet (20,252 m).
- Project High Jump: A series of time-to-altitude records was set in early 1962: 34.523 seconds to 3,000 m (9,840 ft), 48.787 seconds to 6,000 m (19,700 ft), 61.629 seconds to 9,000 m (29,500 ft), 77.156 seconds to 12,000 m (39,400 ft), 114.548 seconds to 15,000 m (49,200 ft), 178.5 s to 20,000 m (65,600 ft), 230.44 s to 25,000 m (82,000 ft), and 371.43 s to 30,000 m (98,400 ft). All High Jump records were set by F4H-1 production number 108 (Bureau Number 148423). Two of the records were set by future distinguished NASA astronaut LCdr John Young.

== Design ==
=== Overview ===
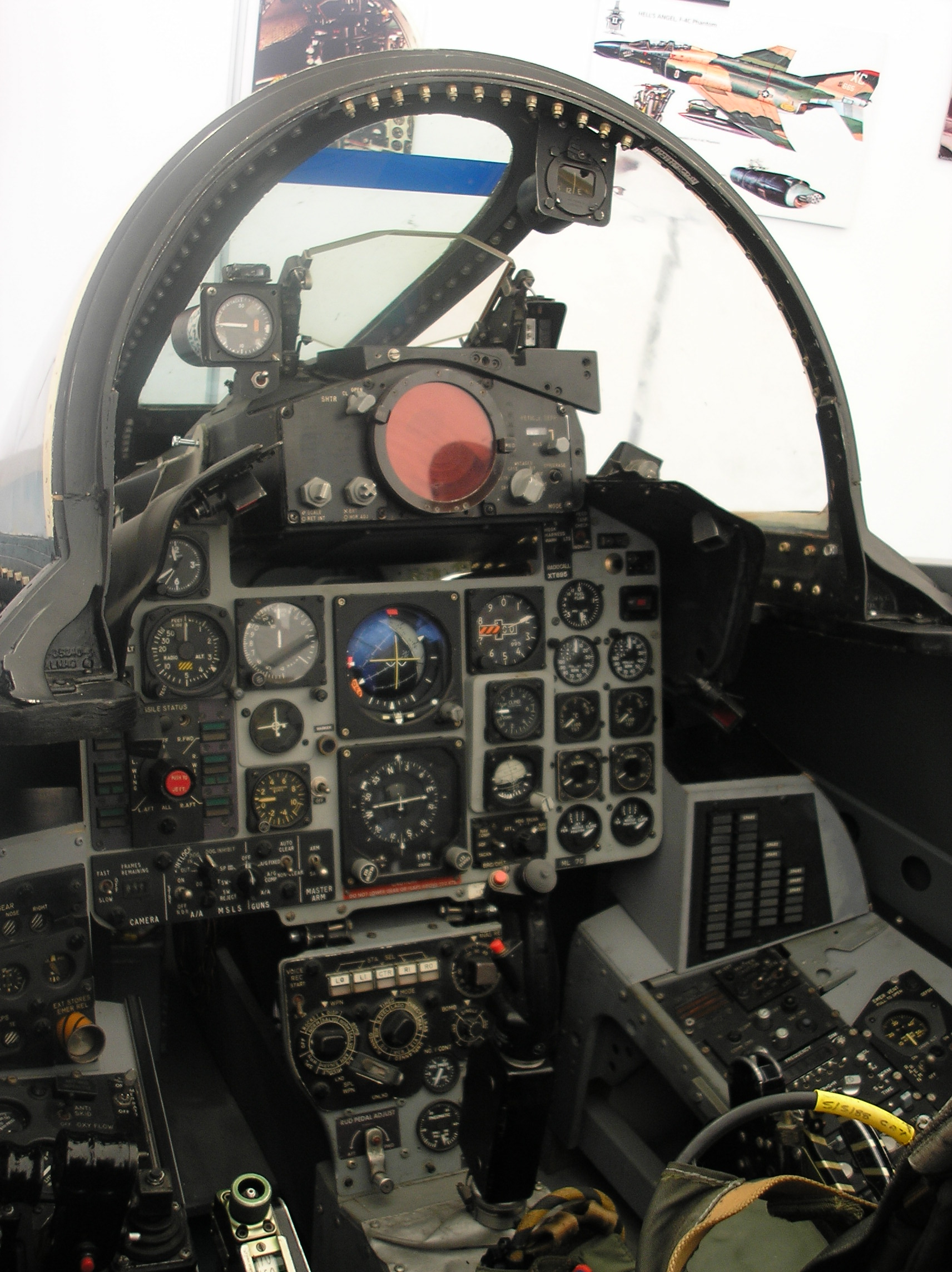
Cockpit of F-4 Phantom II

The F-4 Phantom is a tandem-seat fighter-bomber designed as a carrier-based interceptor to fill the USN's fleet defense fighter role. Innovations in the F-4 included use of pulse-doppler radar (only on late variants such as the F-4F) and extensive use of titanium in its airframe.

Despite imposing dimensions and a maximum takeoff weight over 60,000 lb (27,000 kg), the F-4 has a top speed of Mach 2.23 and an initial climb rate over 41,000 ft/min (210 m/s). The F-4's nine external hardpoints can hold up to 18,650 lb (8,480 kg) of weapons, including air-to-air and air-to-surface missiles, and unguided, guided, and thermonuclear weapons. Like other interceptors of its day, the F-4 was designed without an internal cannon.

The baseline performance of a Mach 2-class fighter with long range and a bomber-sized payload would be the template for the next generation of large and light/middle-weight fighters optimized for daylight air combat.

=== Flight characteristics ===
Cockpit of an F-4 Phantom II at the Estonian Aviation Museum

"Speed is life" was F-4 pilots' slogan, as the Phantom's greatest advantage in air combat was acceleration and thrust, which permitted a skilled pilot to engage and disengage from the fight at will. MiGs usually could outturn the F-4 because of the high drag on the Phantom's airframe; as a massive fighter aircraft designed to fire radar-guided missiles from beyond visual range, the F-4 lacked the agility of its Soviet opponents and was subject to adverse yaw during hard maneuvering. Although the F-4 was subject to irrecoverable spins during aileron rolls, pilots reported the aircraft to be very responsive and easy to fly on the edge of its performance envelope. In 1972, the F-4E model was upgraded with leading edge slats on the wing, greatly improving high angle of attack maneuverability at the expense of top speed.

F-4 Phantom II flight demonstration video

The J79 had a reduced time lag between the pilot advancing the throttle, from idle to maximum thrust, and the engine producing maximum thrust compared to earlier engines. While landing on USS Midway (CV-41) John Chesire's tailhook missed the arresting gear as he (mistakenly) reduced thrust to idle. He then slammed the throttle to full afterburner, the engine's response time being enough to return to full thrust quickly, and he was able get the Phantom airborne again successfully (bolter). The J79 produced noticeable amounts of black smoke (at mid-throttle/cruise settings), a severe disadvantage in that it made it easier for the enemy to spot the aircraft. Two decades after the aircraft entered service this was solved on the F-4S, which was fitted with the −10A engine variant with a smokeless combustor.

The lack of an internal gun "was the biggest mistake on the F-4", Chesire said. "Bullets are cheap and tend to go where you aim them. I needed a gun, and I really wished I had one." Marine Corps General John R. Dailey recalled that "everyone in RF-4s wished they had a gun on the aircraft." For a brief period, doctrine held that turning combat would be impossible at supersonic speeds and little effort was made to teach pilots air combat maneuvering. In reality, engagements quickly became subsonic, as pilots would slow down in an effort to get behind their adversaries. Furthermore, the relatively new heat-seeking and radar-guided missiles at the time were frequently reported as unreliable and pilots had to fire multiple missiles just to hit one enemy fighter. To compound the problem, rules of engagement in Vietnam precluded long-range missile attacks in most instances, as visual identification was normally required. Many pilots found themselves on the tail of an enemy aircraft, but too close to fire short-range Falcons or Sidewinders. Although by 1965 USAF F-4Cs began carrying SUU-16 external gunpods containing a 20 mm (.79 in) M61A1 Vulcan Gatling cannon, USAF cockpits were not equipped with lead-computing gunsights until the introduction of the SUU-23, virtually assuring a miss in a maneuvering fight. Some Marine Corps aircraft carried two pods for strafing. In addition to the loss of performance due to drag, combat showed the externally mounted cannon to be inaccurate unless frequently boresighted, yet far more cost-effective than missiles. The lack of a cannon was finally addressed by adding an internally mounted 20 mm (.79 in) M61A1 Vulcan on the F-4E.

=== Costs ===
	F-4C	RF-4C	F-4D	F-4E
Unit R&D cost	–	61,200 (1965) by 1973; 625,248 (current) by 1973	–	22,700 (1965) by 1973; 231,914 (current) by 1973
Airframe	1,388,725 (1965); 14,187,872 (current)	1,679,000 (1965); 17,153,458 (current)	1,018,682 (1965); 10,407,337 (current)	1,662,000 (1965); 16,979,778 (current)
Engines	317,647 (1965); 3,245,232 (current)	276,000 (1965); 2,819,747 (current)	260,563 (1965); 2,662,035 (current)	393,000 (1965); 4,015,074 (current)
Electronics	52,287 (1965); 534,189 (current)	293,000 (1965); 2,993,427 (current)	262,101 (1965); 2,677,748 (current)	299,000 (1965); 3,054,725 (current)
Armament	139,706 (1965); 1,427,303 (current)	73,000 (1965); 745,803 (current)	133,430 (1965); 1,363,184 (current)	111,000 (1965); 1,134,029 (current)
Ordnance	–	–	6,817 (1965); 69,646 (current)	8,000 (1965); 81,732 (current)
Flyaway cost	1.9 million (1965); 19.4 million (current)	2.3 million (1965); 23.5 million (current)	1.7 million (1965); 17.4 million (current)	2.4 million (1965); 24.5 million (current)
Modification costs	116,289 (1965) by 1973; 1,188,063 (current) by 1973	55,217 (1965) by 1973; 564,123 (2008) by 1973	233,458 (1965) by 1973; 2,385,117 (current) by 1973	7,995 (1965) by 1973; 81,681 (current) by 1973
Cost per flying hour	924 (1965); 9,440 (2008)	867 (1965); 8,858 (current)	896 (1965); 9,154 (current)	867 (1965); 8,858 (current)
Maintenance cost per flying hour	545 (1965); 5,568 (current)			

Note: Original amounts were in 1965 U.S. dollars. The figures in these tables have been adjusted for inflation to the current year.

== Operational history ==
=== United States Navy ===
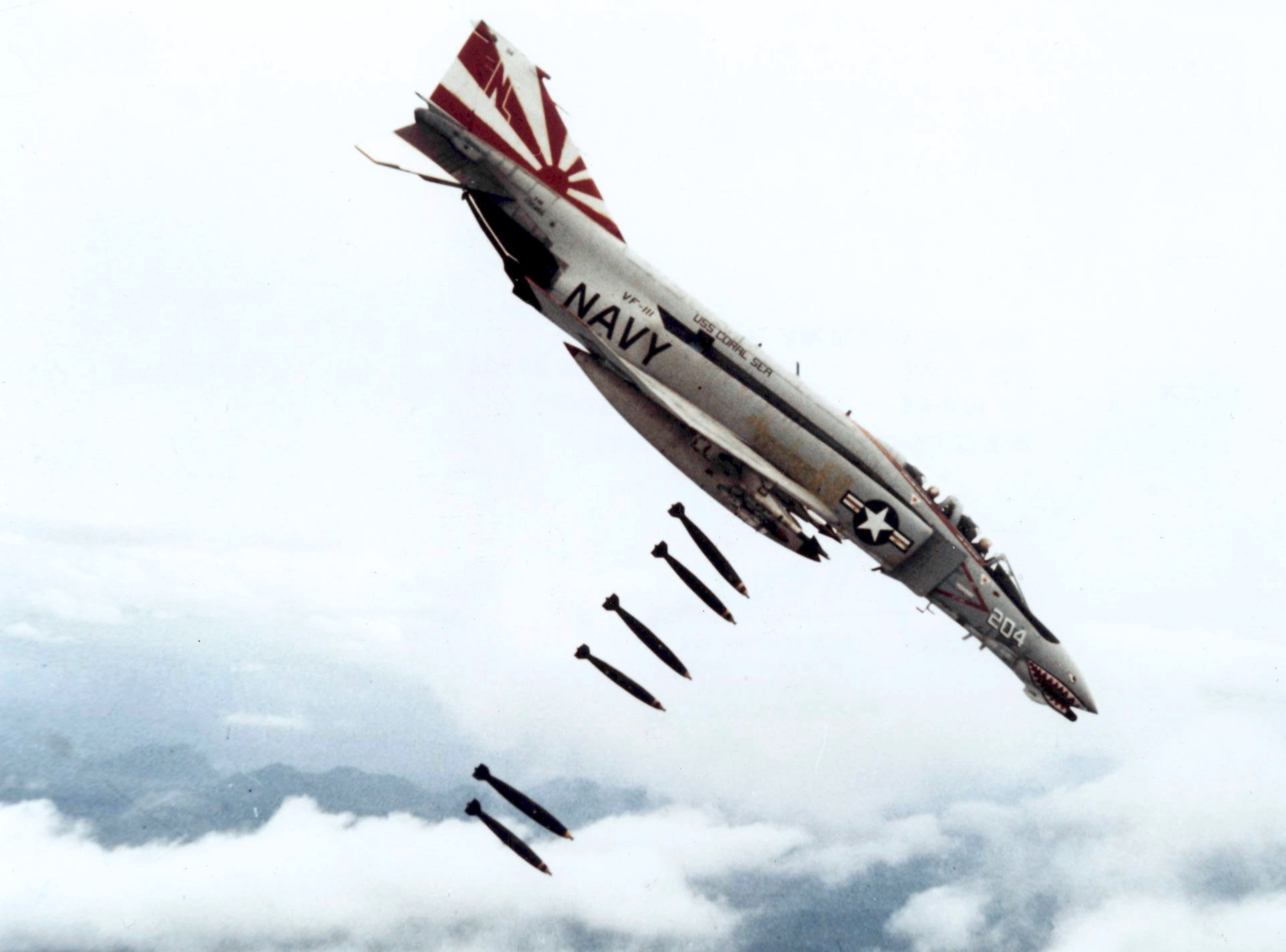
A U.S. Navy F-4B from VF-111 dropping bombs over Vietnam, 25 November 1971

On 30 December 1960, VF-121 Pacemakers at NAS Miramar became the first Phantom operator with its F4H-1Fs (F-4As). The VF-74 Be-devilers at NAS Oceana became the first deployable Phantom squadron when it received its F4H-1s (F-4Bs) on 8 July 1961. The squadron completed carrier qualifications in October 1961 and Phantom's first full carrier deployment between August 1962 and March 1963 aboard Forrestal. The second deployable U.S. Atlantic Fleet squadron to receive F-4Bs was the VF-102 Diamondbacks, who promptly took their new aircraft on the shakedown cruise of Enterprise. The first deployable U.S. Pacific Fleet squadron to receive the F-4B was the VF-114 Aardvarks, which participated in the September 1962 cruise aboard USS Kitty Hawk.

By the time of the Tonkin Gulf incident, 13 of 31 deployable navy squadrons were armed with the type. F-4Bs from Constellation made the first Phantom combat sortie of the Vietnam War on 5 August 1964, flying bomber escort in Operation Pierce Arrow. Navy fighter pilots were unused to flying with a non-pilot RIO, but learned from air combat in Vietnam the benefits of the GiB "guy in back" or "voice in the luggage compartment" helping with the workload. The first Phantom air-to-air victory of the war took place on 9 April 1965 when an F-4B from VF-96 Fighting Falcons piloted by Lieutenant (junior grade) Terence M. Murphy and his RIO, Ensign Ronald Fegan, shot down a Chinese MiG-17. The Phantom was then shot down, probably by an AIM-7 Sparrow from one of its wingmen. There continues to be controversy over whether the Phantom was shot down by MiG guns or, as enemy reports later indicated, an AIM-7 Sparrow III from one of Murphy's and Fegan's wingmen. On 17 June 1965, an F-4B from VF-21 Freelancers piloted by Commander Louis Page and Lieutenant John C. Smith shot down the first North Vietnamese MiG of the war.

On 10 May 1972, Lieutenant Randy "Duke" Cunningham and Lieutenant (junior grade) William P. Driscoll flying an F-4J, call sign Showtime 100, shot down three MiG-17s to become the first American flying aces of the war. Their fifth victory was believed at the time to be over a mysterious North Vietnamese ace, Colonel Nguyen Toon, now considered mythical. On the return flight, the Phantom was damaged by an enemy surface-to-air missile. To avoid being captured, Cunningham and Driscoll flew their burning aircraft using only the rudder and afterburner (the damage to the aircraft rendered conventional control nearly impossible), until they could eject over water.

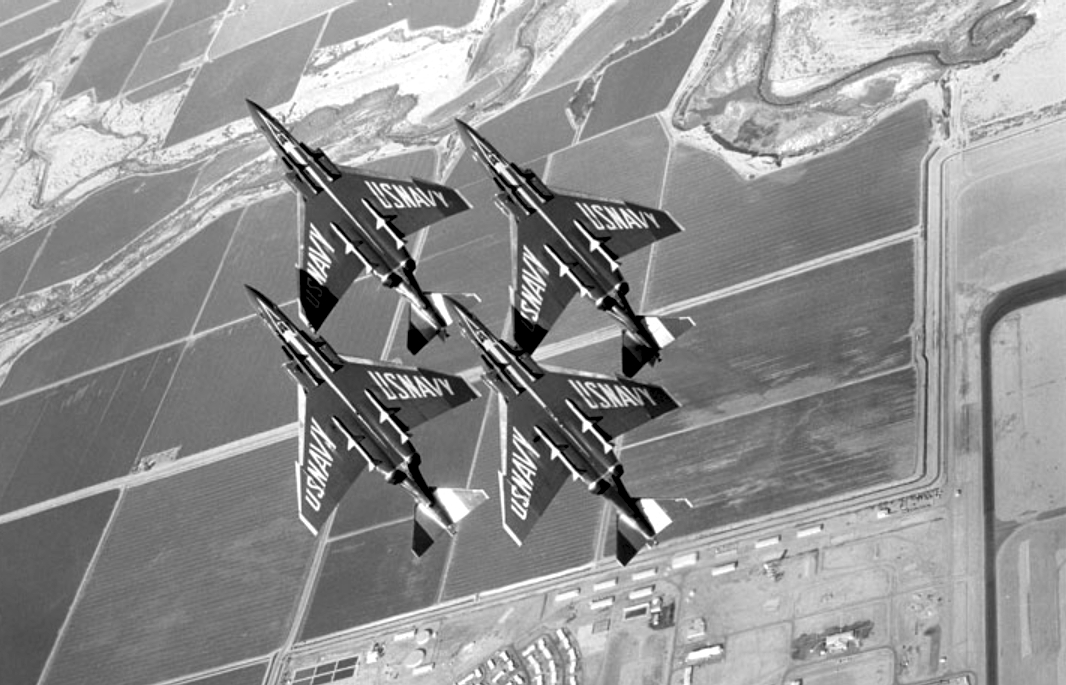
The Blue Angels flew the F-4J from 1969 to 1974

During the war, U.S. Navy F-4 Phantom squadrons participated in 84 combat tours with F-4Bs, F-4Js, and F-4Ns. The Navy claimed 40 air-to-air victories at a cost of 73 Phantoms lost in combat (seven to enemy aircraft, 13 to SAMs and 53 to AAA). An additional 54 Phantoms were lost in mishaps.

In 1984, all Navy F-4Ns were retired from Fleet service in deployable USN squadrons and by 1987 the last F-4Ss were retired from deployable USN squadrons. On 25 March 1986, an F-4S belonging to the VF-151 Vigilantes became the last active duty U.S. Navy Phantom to launch from an aircraft carrier, in this case, Midway. On 18 October 1986, an F-4S from the VF-202 Superheats, a Naval Reserve fighter squadron, made the last-ever Phantom carrier landing while operating aboard America. In 1987, the last of the Naval Reserve-operated F-4S aircraft were replaced by F-14As. The last Phantoms in service with the Navy were QF-4N and QF-4S target drones operated by the Naval Air Warfare Center at NAS Point Mugu, California. These were subsequently retired in 2004.

=== United States Marine Corps ===
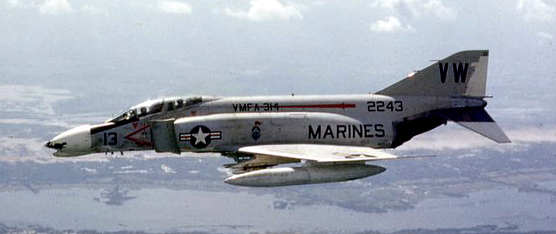
A U.S. Marine F-4B with VMFA-314, flies over South Vietnam in September 1968

The Marine Corps received its first F-4Bs in June 1962, with the Black Knights of VMFA-314 at Marine Corps Air Station El Toro, California becoming the first operational squadron. Marine Phantoms of VMFA-323 Death Rattlers, flying from Puerto Rico, provided air cover during Operation Power Pack for the evacuation of US citizens from the Dominican Republic and assisted the 508th Infantry Regiment in taking and securing a position east of the Duarte bridge. Marine Phantoms from VMFA-531 Grey Ghosts were assigned to Da Nang Air Base on South Vietnam's northeast coast on 10 May 1965 and were initially assigned to provide air defense for the USMC. They soon began close air support missions (CAS) and VMFA-314, VMFA-232 Red Devils, VMFA-323 Death Rattlers and VMFA-542 Tigers joined them.

Marine Phantoms from VMFA-323 and VMFA-531 operating from the USS Coral Sea participated in Operation Eagle Claw, the attempted rescue of American hostages from Iran, with orders to shoot down any Iranian aircraft. The Phantoms were painted with an orange stripe enclosed by two black stripes in order to distinguish the American F-4s from the Iranian F-4s. The operation was called off in the early stages of execution.

The VMCJ-1 Golden Hawks (later VMAQ-1 and VMAQ-4 which had the old RM tailcode) flew the first photo recon mission with an RF-4B variant on 3 November 1966 from Da Nang and remained there until 1970 with no RF-4B losses and only one aircraft damaged by anti-aircraft artillery (AAA) fire. VMCJ-2 and VMCJ-3 (now VMAQ-3) provided aircraft for VMCJ-1 in Da Nang and VMFP-3 was formed in 1975 at MCAS El Toro, CA consolidating all USMC RF-4Bs in one unit that became known as "The Eyes of the Corps." VMFP-3 disestablished in August 1990 after the Advanced Tactical Airborne Reconnaissance System was introduced for the F/A-18D Hornet.

The F-4 continued to equip fighter-attack squadrons in both active and reserve Marine Corps units throughout the 1960s, 1970s and 1980s and into the early 1990s. In the early 1980s, these squadrons began to transition to the F/A-18 Hornet, starting with the same squadron that introduced the F-4 to the Marine Corps, VMFA-314 at MCAS El Toro, California. On 18 January 1992, the last Marine Corps Phantom, an F-4S in the Marine Corps Reserve, was retired by the Cowboys of VMFA-112 at NAS Dallas, Texas, after which the squadron was re-equipped with F/A-18 Hornets.

=== United States Air Force ===
USAF F-4 Summary for Vietnam War action
Aircraft	Weapons/Tactics	MiG-17	MiG-19	MiG-21	Total
F-4C	AIM-7 Sparrow	4	0	10	14
F-4C	AIM-9 Sidewinder	12	0	10	22
F-4C	20 mm gunpod	3	0	1	4
F-4C	Maneuvering tactics	2	0	0	2
F-4D	AIM-4 Falcon	4	0	1	5
F-4D	AIM-7 Sparrow	4	2	20	26
F-4D	AIM-9 Sidewinder	0	2	3	5
F-4D	20 mm gunpod	4.5	0	2	6.5
F-4D	Maneuvering tactics	0	0	2	2
F-4E	AIM-7 Sparrow	0	2	8	10
F-4E	AIM-9 Sidewinder	0	0	4	4
F-4E	AIM-9 and 20 mm gunpod	0	0	1	1
F-4E	20 mm gunpod	0	1	4	5
F-4E	Maneuvering tactics	0	1	0	1
Total		33.5	8	66	107.5

In USAF service, the F-4 was initially designated the F-110A prior to the introduction of the 1962 United States Tri-Service aircraft designation system. The USAF quickly embraced the design and became the largest Phantom user. The first Phantoms that the USAF operated were F-4Bs loaned from the Navy, with 27 jets delivered to the 4453rd Combat Crew Training Wing at MacDill Air Force Base, Florida, in November 1963. The first operational unit was the 12th Tactical Fighter Wing, who received the USAF's first F-4Cs in January 1964, achieving initial operational capability (IOC) in October 1964. The first USAF Phantoms to participate in the Vietnam War were F-4Cs from the 45th Tactical Fighter Squadron, who deployed to Ubon Royal Thai Air Force Base, Thailand, in April 1965.

Unlike the U.S. Navy and U.S. Marine Corps, which flew the Phantom with a Naval Aviator (pilot) in the front seat and a naval flight officer as a radar intercept officer (RIO) in the back seat, the USAF initially flew its Phantoms with a rated Air Force Pilot in front and back seats. Pilots usually did not like flying in the back seat; while the GIB, or "guy in back", could fly and ostensibly land the aircraft, they had fewer flight instruments and a very restricted forward view. The Air Force later assigned a rated Air Force Navigator qualified as a weapon/targeting systems officer (later designated as weapon systems officer or WSO) in the rear seat instead of another pilot.

On 10 July 1965, F-4Cs of the 45th TFS, 15th TFW, scored the USAF's first victories against North Vietnamese MiG-17s using AIM-9 Sidewinder air-to-air missiles. On 26 April 1966, an F-4C from the 480th Tactical Fighter Squadron scored the first aerial victory by a U.S. aircrew over a North Vietnamese MiG-21 "Fishbed". On 24 July 1965, another Phantom from the 45th Tactical Fighter Squadron became the first American aircraft to be downed by an enemy SAM, and on 5 October 1966 an 8th Tactical Fighter Wing F-4C became the first U.S. jet lost to an air-to-air missile, fired by a MiG-21.

On 2 January 1967, F-4Cs of the 8th Tactical Fighter Wing, under the command of Robin Olds, executed Operation Bolo, a response to heavy losses sustained during Operation Rolling Thunder. Olds' and his flight flew out of Ubon in Thailand and simulated an F-105 strike force. In response, the VPAF sent up MiG-21s to shoot down the Phantoms. The ensuing battle resulted in the VPAF losing half of their MiG-21 fleet with no losses from the American side.

Early aircraft suffered from leaks in wing fuel tanks that required re-sealing after each flight and 85 aircraft were found to have cracks in outer wing ribs and stringers. There were also problems with aileron control cylinders, electrical connectors, and engine compartment fires. Reconnaissance RF-4Cs made their debut in Vietnam on 30 October 1965, flying the hazardous post-strike reconnaissance missions. The USAF Thunderbirds used the F-4E from the 1969 season until 1974.

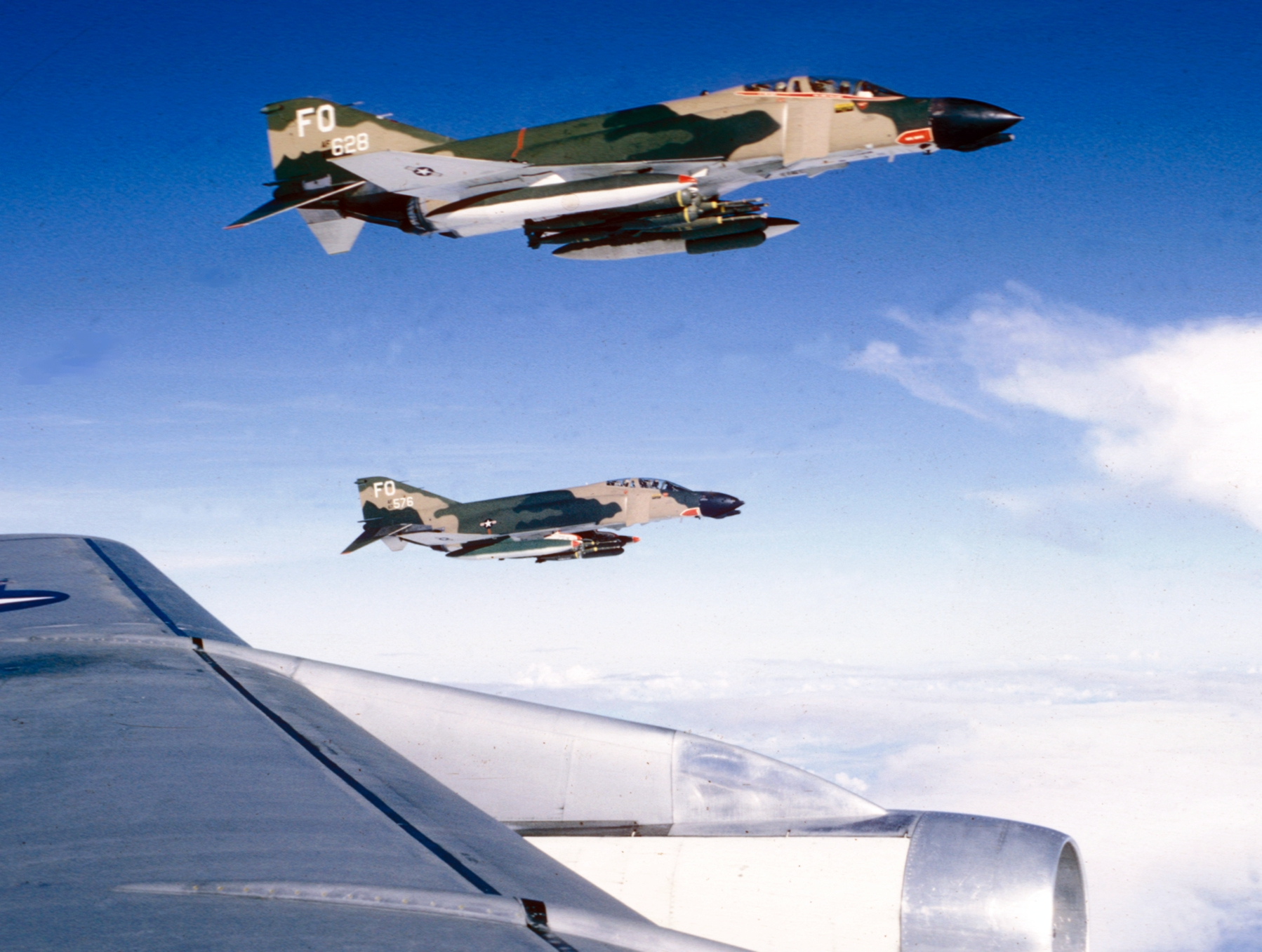
435th TFS F-4Ds over Vietnam

Although the F-4C was essentially identical to the Navy/Marine Corps F-4B in-flight performance and carried the AIM-9 Sidewinder missiles, USAF-tailored F-4Ds initially arrived in June 1967 equipped with AIM-4 Falcons. However, the Falcon, like its predecessors, was designed to shoot down heavy bombers flying straight and level. Its reliability proved no better than others and its complex firing sequence and limited seeker-head cooling time made it virtually useless in combat against agile fighters. The F-4Ds reverted to using Sidewinders under the "Rivet Haste" program in early 1968, and by 1972 the AIM-7E-2 "Dogfight Sparrow" had become the preferred missile for USAF pilots. Like other Vietnam War Phantoms, the F-4Ds were urgently fitted with radar warning receivers to detect the Soviet-built S-75 Dvina SAMs.

From the initial deployment of the F-4C to Southeast Asia, USAF Phantoms performed both air superiority and ground attack roles, supporting not only ground troops in South Vietnam, but also conducting bombing sorties in Laos and North Vietnam. As the F-105 force underwent severe attrition between 1965 and 1968, the bombing role of the F-4 proportionately increased until after November 1970 (when the last F-105D was withdrawn from combat) it became the primary USAF tactical ordnance delivery system. In October 1972 the first squadron of EF-4C Wild Weasel aircraft deployed to Thailand on temporary duty. The "E" prefix was later dropped and the aircraft was simply known as the F-4C Wild Weasel.

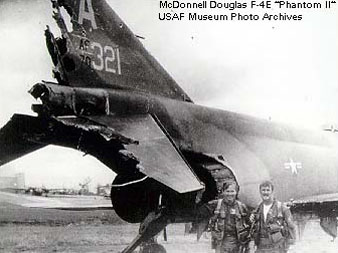
Battle-damaged F-4E Phantom II (S/N 67-321) of the 366th TFW, recovered by 1st Lts. Zimmerman and Craighead after MiG, SAM, and AAA damage. Despite losing hydraulics, rudder, and slats, Zimmerman landed successfully. (U.S. Air Force photo)

Sixteen squadrons of Phantoms were permanently deployed to Indochina between 1965 and 1973, and 17 others deployed on temporary combat assignments. Peak numbers of combat F-4s occurred in 1972, when 353 were based in Thailand. A total of 445 Air Force Phantom fighter-bombers were lost, 370 in combat and 193 of those over North Vietnam (33 to MiGs, 30 to SAMs and 307 to AAA).

The RF-4C was operated by four squadrons, and of the 83 losses, 72 were in combat including 38 over North Vietnam (seven to SAMs and 65 to AAA). By war's end, the U.S. Air Force had lost a total of 528 F-4 and RF-4C Phantoms. When combined with U.S. Navy and Marine Corps losses of 233 Phantoms, 761 F-4/RF-4 Phantoms were lost in the Vietnam War.

On 28 August 1972, Captain Steve Ritchie became the first USAF ace of the war. On 9 September 1972, WSO Capt Charles B. DeBellevue became the highest-scoring American ace of the war with six victories. and WSO Capt Jeffrey Feinstein became the last USAF ace of the war on 13 October 1972. Upon return to the United States, DeBellevue and Feinstein were assigned to undergraduate pilot training (Feinstein was given a vision waiver) and requalified as USAF pilots in the F-4. USAF F-4C/D/E crews claimed 107.5 MiG kills in Southeast Asia (50 by Sparrow, 31 by Sidewinder, five by Falcon, 15.5 by gun, and six by other means).

Gun-camera recorded kill from F-4 Phantom II piloted by Captains Steve Ritchie & Jeff Feinstein.

On 31 January 1972, the 170th Tactical Fighter Squadron, 183d Tactical Fighter Group of the Illinois Air National Guard became the first Air National Guard (ANG) unit to transition to Phantoms from Republic F-84F Thunderstreaks. Phantoms would eventually equip numerous tactical fighter and tactical reconnaissance units in the USAF active, ANG, and Air Force Reserve (AFRES).

On 2 June 1972, a Phantom flying at supersonic speed shot down a MiG-19 over Thud Ridge in Vietnam with its cannon. At a recorded speed of Mach 1.2, Major Phil Handley's shoot down was the first and only recorded gun kill while flying at supersonic speeds.

In early December 1989, USAF F-4s, from Clark Air Base, participated in Operation Classic Resolve, President George H. W. Bush's response to the 1989 Philippine coup attempt. The F-4s were ordered to buzz the rebel planes at their base, fire at them if any tried to take off, and shoot them down if they did. The buzzing by the US F-4s soon caused the coup to collapse. On 2 December, President Bush reported that on 1 December, US fighter aircraft from Clark Air Base assisted Philippine President Corazon Aquino's government repel a coup attempt.

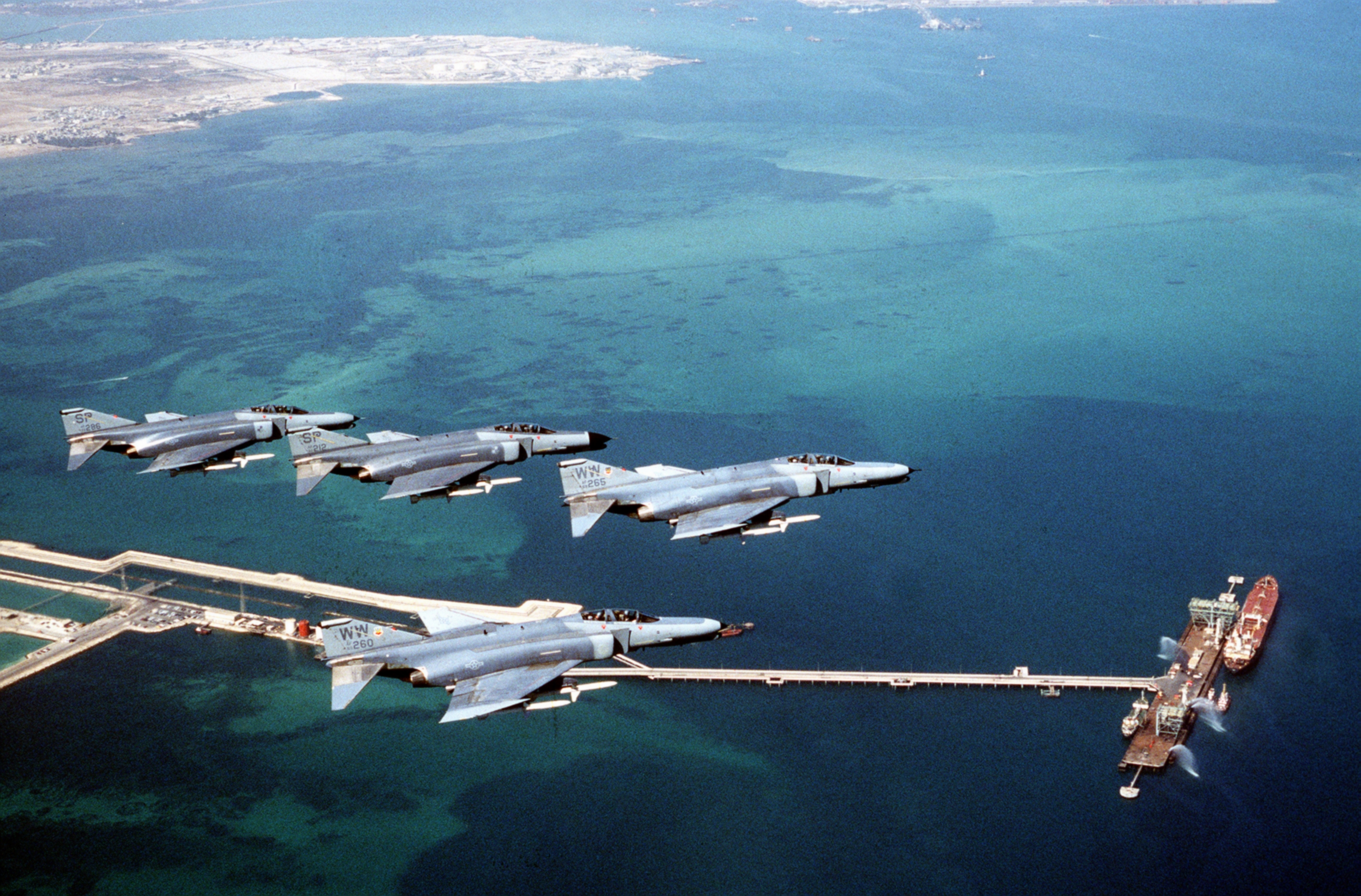
F-4Gs over Bahrain during Operation Desert Shield

On 15 August 1990, 24 F-4G Wild Weasel Vs and six RF-4Cs were deployed to Isa Air Base, Bahrain, for Operation Desert Storm. The F-4G was the only aircraft in the USAF inventory equipped for the Suppression of Enemy Air Defenses role, and was needed to protect coalition aircraft from Iraq's extensive air defense system. The RF-4C was the only aircraft equipped with the ultra-long-range KS-127 LOROP (long-range oblique photography) camera and was used for a variety of reconnaissance missions. In spite of flying almost daily missions, only one RF-4C was lost in a fatal accident before the start of hostilities. One F-4G was lost when enemy fire damaged the fuel tanks and the aircraft ran out of fuel near a friendly airbase. The last USAF Phantoms, F-4G Wild Weasel Vs from 561st Fighter Squadron, were retired on 26 March 1996. The last operational flight of the F-4G Wild Weasel was from the 190th Fighter Squadron, Idaho Air National Guard, in April 1996.

==== Target drone ====
Like the Navy, the Air Force also operated QF-4 target drones, serving with the 82d Aerial Targets Squadron at Tyndall Air Force Base, Florida, and Holloman Air Force Base, New Mexico. Replacing the QF-106, the QF-4 program achieved IOC in 1997, with the last QF-106 being shot down on 20 February 1997. It was expected that the F-4 would remain in the target role with the 82d ATRS until at least 2015, when they would be replaced by early versions of the F-16 Fighting Falcon converted to a QF-16 configuration.

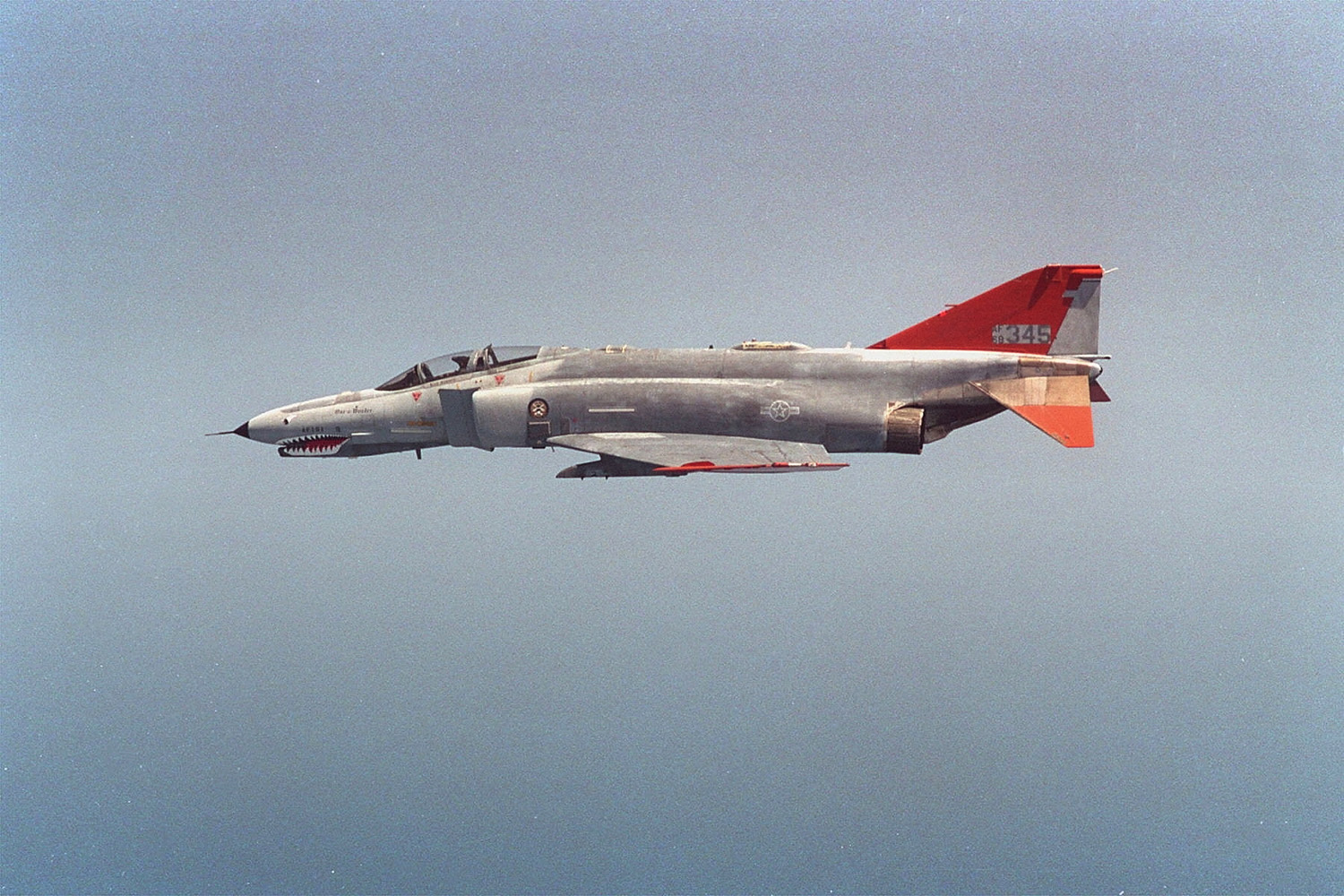
QF-4E flying over the Gulf of Mexico, 1998

On 19 November 2013, BAE Systems delivered its 314th, and last, QF-4 aerial target to the Air Force. The example, RF-4C 68-0599, had been in storage for over 20 years before being converted. Over 16 years, BAE had converted 314 F-4 and RF-4 Phantom IIs into QF-4s and QRF-4s, with each aircraft taking six months to adapt. By December 2013, QF-4 and QRF-4 aircraft had flown over 16,000 manned and 600 unmanned training sorties, with 250 unmanned aircraft being shot down in firing exercises. The remaining QF-4s and QRF-4s held their training role until the first of 126 QF-16s were delivered by Boeing. The first QF-16 was delivered to Tyndall AFB in September 2014, achieving IOC on 23 September 2015. The final flight of an Air Force QF-4 from Tyndall AFB took place on 27 May 2015 to Holloman AFB.

After Tyndall AFB ceased operations, the 53d Weapons Evaluation Group at Holloman became the fleet of 22 QF-4s' last remaining operator. The base continued using them to fly manned test and unmanned live fire test support and Foreign Military Sales testing. The final unmanned flight took place on 17 August 2016, with QF-4E 72-0166 being fired upon by a Lockheed Martin F-35 Lightning II before returning safely back to Holloman AFB. The type was officially retired from US military service with a four–ship flight at Holloman during an event on 21 December 2016. The last 13 QF-4s were stripped of their systems after 1 January 2017 and transferred to the White Sands Missile Range to be used as static targets. During its career as a target drone, several QF-4s retained the capability to be flown as a manned aircraft and were maintained in historical color schemes, being displayed as part of Air Combat Command's Heritage Flight at air shows, base open houses, and other events while serving as non-expendable target aircraft during the week.

=== Aerial combat in the Vietnam War ===
The USAF and the US Navy had high expectations of the F-4 Phantom, assuming that the massive firepower, the best available on-board radar, the highest speed and acceleration properties, coupled with new tactics, would provide Phantoms with an advantage over the MiGs. However, in confrontations with the lighter MiG-21, F-4s did not always succeed and began to suffer losses. Over the course of the air war in Vietnam, between 3 April 1965 and 8 January 1973, each side would ultimately claim favorable kill ratios.

During the war, U.S. Navy F-4 Phantoms claimed 40 air-to-air victories at a loss of seven Phantoms to enemy aircraft. USMC F-4 pilots claimed three enemy MiGs at the cost of one aircraft in air-combat. USAF F-4 Phantom crews scored 107 1/2 MiG kills (including 33 1/2 MiG-17s, eight MiG-19s and 66 MiG-21s) at a cost of 33 Phantoms in air-combat. F-4 pilots were credited with a total of 150 1/2 MiG kills at a cost of 42 Phantoms in air-combat.

According to the Vietnam People's Air Force (VPAF), 103 F-4 Phantoms were shot down by MiG-21s at a cost of 54 MiG-21s downed by F-4s. During the war, the VPAF lost 131 MiGs in air combat (63 MiG-17s, eight MiG-19s and 60 MiG-21s) of which one half were by F-4s.

From 1966 to November 1968, in 46 air battles conducted over North Vietnam between F-4s and MiG-21s, VPAF claimed 27 F-4s were shot down by MiG-21s at a cost of 20 MiG-21s In 1970, one F-4 Phantom was shot down by a MiG-21. The struggle culminated on 10 May 1972, with VPAF aircraft completing 64 sorties, resulting in 15 air battles. The VPAF claimed seven F-4s were shot down, while U.S. confirmed five F-4s were lost. The Phantoms, in turn, managed to destroy two MiG-21s, three MiG-17s, and one MiG-19. On 11 May, two MiG-21s, which played the role of "bait", brought the four F-4s to two MiG-21s circling at low altitude. The MiGs quickly engaged and shot down two F-4s. On 18 May, Vietnamese aircraft made 26 sorties in eight air engagements, which cost 4 F-4 Phantoms; Vietnamese fighters on that day did not suffer losses.

On 5 August 1967, the USS Forrestal was stationed off the Indochina coast to carry out strikes against North Vietnam. An electrical fault caused a Zuni rocket to be fired from an F-4. The rocket struck the fuel tank of an A-4 Skyhawk attack aircraft, starting a fire which quickly spread to other airplanes, setting off several bombs. The fire and explosions killed 134 men and seriously wounded 161 more in what became known as the 1967 USS Forrestal fire.

=== Non-U.S. users ===
The Phantom has served with the air forces of many countries, including Australia, Egypt, Germany, United Kingdom, Greece, Iran, Israel, Japan, Spain, South Korea and Turkey.

==== Australia ====
The Royal Australian Air Force (RAAF) leased 24 USAF F-4Es from 1970 to 1973 while waiting for their order for the General Dynamics F-111C to be delivered. They were so well-liked that the RAAF considered retaining the aircraft after the F-111Cs were delivered. They were operated from RAAF Amberley by No. 1 Squadron and No. 6 Squadron.

==== Egypt ====
In 1979, the Egyptian Air Force purchased 35 former USAF F-4Es along with a number of Sparrow, Sidewinder and Maverick missiles from the U.S. for $594 million as part of the "Peace Pharaoh" program. An additional seven surplus USAF aircraft were purchased in 1988. Three attrition replacements had been received by the end of the 1990s.

Egyptian F-4Es were retired in 2020, with their former base at Cairo West Air Base being reconfigured for the operation of F-16C/D Fighting Falcons.

==== Germany ====
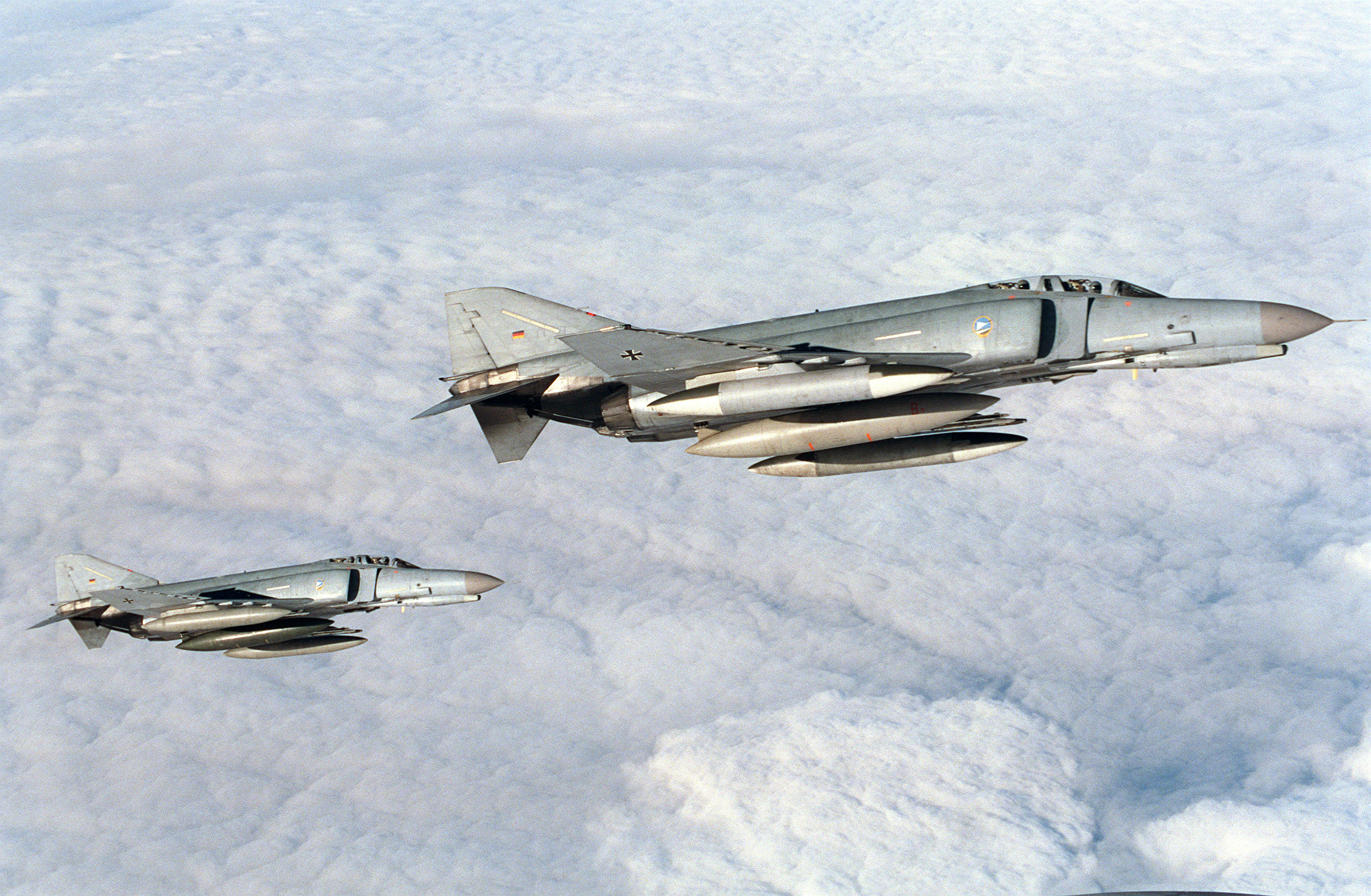
F-4Fs of the German Air Force, 21 January 1998

The West German Air Force (Luftwaffe) found itself in need of numerous new aircraft following the December 1967 publication of NATO's new flexible response doctrine. With the move back towards fighting a conventional war in Europe, there was a need for both far more capable photoreconnaissance and fighter aircraft, with the RF-104G and F-104G fleets respectively being considered obsolescent due to their inability to operate in bad weather, at night, and in the latter's case, its performance being deemed insufficient for the air defense and air superiority missions against the MiG-21 that was fielded en masse by Warsaw Pact air forces. These new aircraft would need to enter service relatively quickly as well, with age and fatigue rates putting Luftwaffe strength below the required numbers by 1976. However, with the ongoing development of the Panavia Tornado there was insufficient capital to design new aircraft for these roles, and thus foreign models would have to be procured.

===== Reconnaissance role =====
The photoreconnaissance aircraft selection pool was relatively small to start with, consisting of the Canadair CF-5A(R), Mirage IIIR, Saab S 35E, Lockheed RTF-104G, and McDonnell Douglas RF-4E. The competition came down to the RTF-104G and RF-4E, the former being a heavily modified phtoreconnaissance variant of the TF-104G and the latter an F-4E based equivalent to the USAF's own RF-4C intended for export customers. As the RTF-104G could still reuse most existing infrastructure at bases operating RF-104Gs while RF-4Es could not, the latter had a substantially higher unit price - 23 million Deutsche Marks for an RF-4E compared to 8 million DM for an RTF-104G. The latter was also considered slightly more modern, and could be built under license on the existing F-104G production line at Messerschmitt-Bölkow-Blohm (MBB), meaning most of the money would be kept in West Germany. However, the safety and power advantages of the Phantom were viewed very favorably - the USAF had experienced loss rates of 9 F-4 versus 25 F-104 for every 100,000 flight hours, and West German experience with the F-104 platform was marred with crashes. Another factor in the Phantom's favor was industrial offsets, as West Germany had set aside 3 billion DM to purchase defense equipment from the U.S. which could be used outside of the normal defense budget to fund this acquisition. In 1969, the German Defense Ministry decided to procure 88 RF-4Es, with the contract costing 2.052 billion DM. While not manufactured in West Germany, their construction was not wholly American. Companies like MBB produced stabilizers, landing gear doors, outer wings, and ailerons which were then shipped to McDonnell Douglas's St. Louis factory for final assembly.

The RF-4E first flew on 15 September 1970, and the West Germans took delivery of their first four aircraft at Bremgarten AB on 20 January 1971. To act as flight instructors, nine pilots and nine navigators were sent to Shaw AFB between 22 January 1970 and 5 May 1971 to attend eight to nine month long training courses on the RF-4C. 108 pilots were trained at George AFB between 10 October 1970 and 4 February 1972 for five week flight training courses. These pilots had to receive sensor training from the aforementioned flight instructors after returning to their units in West Germany.

With the lethality of Warsaw Pact air defenses increasing along with the strength of their conventional ground forces over the course of the 1970s, in 1978 it was decided to simultaneously retrofit the aircraft for a secondary ground attack role using the same equipment as the F-4F, and to improve their self-defense capabilities by fitting improved flare and chaff systems and a more capable radar warning receiver. New infrared cameras were also fitted for improved reconnaissance capabilities. 71 aircraft were again upgraded in the mid 1980's, as planners saw no replacement for the type available before 2005. These included an increase in maximum flight hours for 4,500 to 8,000 per airframe, the installation of a laser and GPS navigation system, a new AN/APQ-172 terrain following radar, and integration for the new AIM-9L Sidewinder. However, after German reunification and the end of the Cold War, there was a sharp drawdown in military spending. 27 RF-4Es were sold to the Greek Air Force, of which seven were spares. Another 46 were sold to the Turkish Air Force - 33 operational aircraft and 13 spares. The Luftwaffe retired the type in 1994, and the last example was handed over to the Museum of the Luftwaffe on 23 November 2003.

===== Fighter role =====
F-4 Air Combat Tactics (1968) De-classified official USAF aerial combat engagement pilot training film reel.

The fighter contract was designed to prevent the loss rates that had plagued F-104 in Luftwaffe service from repeating. Two of the key requirements in the new fighter program were an all-weather navigation system and two engines. The competition also featured a greater variety of contestants, with the SEPECAT Jaguar, Saab Viggen, Dassault Mirage F1, Northrop F-5, Northrop P-530, and McDonnell Douglas F-4F all being offered. With RF-4E already being adopted, combined with F-4F's advantages in range and weapons load, it was the declared the winner and an order for 175 aircraft placed on 24 June 1971 under the "Peace Rhine" program, with a unit price of approximately 12 million DM. The “F” variant was a simplified version of the “E”, designed for maximum compatibility with RF-4E. The aircraft was roughly 1,500 kilograms (3,300 lb) lighter, lacking the ram air turbine, rear fuselage fuel tank, slatted stabilizers, and ability to use AIM-7 Sparrow. However, these weight reductions combined with the leading edge slats that were not present on RF-4E made F-4F markedly more maneuverable, especially at low speeds. All but the first F-4F incorporated West German built subcomponents in the same manner as their RF-4Es. All F-4Fs were delivered between 1973 and 1976. These purchases made Germany the largest export customer for the Phantom.

The F-4F first flew on 18 March 1973, and was publicly unveiled on 24 May of the same year. Shortly thereafter, the first 12 aircraft were delivered to George AFB in cooperation with the 35th Tactical Fighter Wing to stand up an operational conversion unit, with pilots of Jagdgeschwader 71 (Fighter Wing 71) arriving on 1 January 1974 to begin training. Due to the urgent need for the aircraft in frontline service, West Germany replaced these F-4Fs with 10 new F-4Es in 1975, which were permanently stationed in the U.S. for training until their retirement in 1997. A single F-4F was kept in the U.S. on loan to U.S. Air Force Systems Command until 1982 under the designation NTF-4F, which was used as a testbed for new technologies in the aircraft. The F-4F was upgraded in the mid-1980s to use more capable ordnance that was being introduced by the U.S. in light of new capabilities introduced by the Warsaw Pact militaries. These alterations included a new digital weapons computer, altering the radar to allow for bombing through cloud cover, a HUD, and integration of the AIM-9L Sidewinder and AGM-65B Maverick. The droptank was replaced with a lower drag model used by F-15C, and both the radar warning receiver and jamming pods were upgraded. The chaff/flare dispensers were also replaced with more capable models.

Much as the Warsaw Pact's improving conventional strengths had seen a need for a more capable reconnaissance aircraft, the increasing lethality of air defenses and aircraft saw a similar need for more capable fighters. While procurement of the Tornado ADV was considered, it was decided against in favor of upgrading the F-4F fleet. The program, known as Improved Combat Efficiency (ICE) or Kampfwertsteigerung (KWS) began in 1983 and sought to fit the aircraft with substantially improved air to air and air to ground weapons, including beyond-visual-range missiles and standoff weapons To start, the 153 F-4Fs in frontline service all received modest upgrades known as KWS-LA (ground attack, luftangriff), including a laser navigation system and structural upgrades to extend maximum flight hours from 4,000 to 6,500 per airframe. 110 of these were further upgraded under KWS-LV (air defense, luftverteidigung) with the AN/APG-65GY radar, a new mission computer, and compatibility with AIM-120 AMRAAM. The KWS-LV F-4Fs entered service in 1992, and were expected to remain in service until 2012. All the remaining Luftwaffe Phantoms were based at Wittmund with Jagdgeschwader 71 in Northern Germany and WTD61 at Manching. A total of 24 F-4Fs were operated by the 49th Tactical Fighter Wing of the USAF at Holloman AFB to train Luftwaffe crews until December 2004. Phantoms were deployed to NATO states under the Baltic Air Policing starting in 2005, 2008, 2009, 2011 and 2012. The German Air Force retired its last F-4Fs on 29 June 2013. German F-4Fs flew 279,000 hours from entering service on 31 August 1973 until retirement.

==== Greece ====
In 1972, the Hellenic Air Force signed a contract for 36 brand new F-4E Phantoms, with deliveries starting in 1974. In the early 1990s, the Hellenic AF acquired surplus RF-4Es and F-4Es from the Luftwaffe and U.S. ANG. Following the success of the German ICE program, on 11 August 1997, a contract was signed between DASA of Germany and Hellenic Aerospace Industry for the upgrade of 39 aircraft to the very similar "Peace Icarus 2000" standard. On 5 May 2017, the Hellenic Air Force officially retired the RF-4E Phantom II during a public ceremony.

==== Iran ====
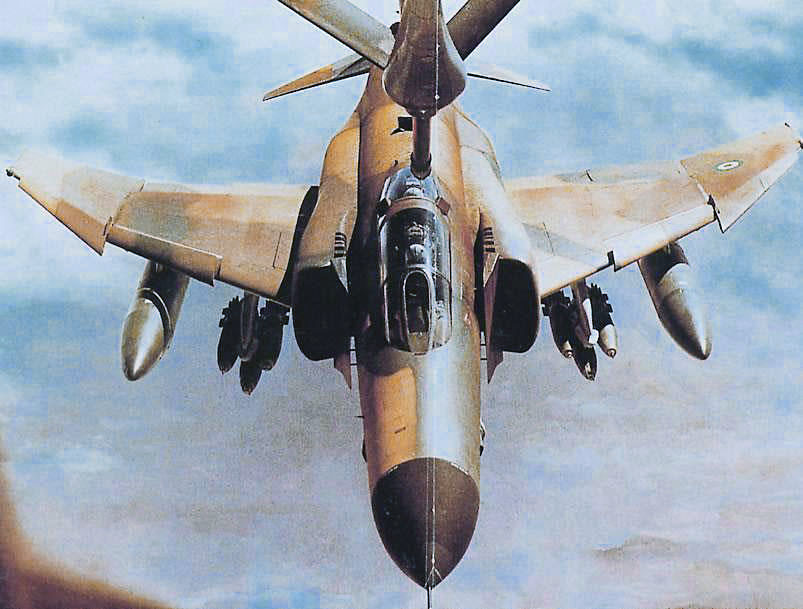
Iranian F-4E Phantom refueling through a boom during Iran-Iraq war, 1982

In the 1960s and 1970s when the U.S. and Iran were on friendly terms, the U.S. delivered 225 F-4D, F-4E, and RF-4E Phantoms to Iran, making it the second largest export customer. The Imperial Iranian Air Force saw at least one engagement, resulting in a loss, after an RF-4C was rammed by a Soviet MiG-21 during Project Dark Gene, an ELINT operation during the Cold War.

The Islamic Republic of Iran Air Force Phantoms saw heavy action in the Iran–Iraq War in the 1980s and were kept operational by overhaul and servicing from Iran's aerospace industry. Notable operations of Iranian F-4s during the war included Operation Scorch Sword, an attack by two F-4s against the Iraqi Osirak nuclear reactor site near Baghdad on 30 September 1980, and the attack on H3, a 4 April 1981 strike by eight Iranian F-4s against the H-3 complex of air bases in the far west of Iraq, which resulted in many Iraqi aircraft being destroyed or damaged for no Iranian losses.

On 5 June 1984, two Saudi Arabian fighter pilots shot down two Iranian F-4 fighters. The Royal Saudi Air Force pilots were flying American-built F-15s and fired air-to-air missiles to bring down the Iranian planes. The Saudi fighter pilots had Boeing KC-135 Stratotanker planes and Boeing E-3 Sentry AWACS surveillance planes assist in the encounter. The aerial fight occurred in Saudi airspace over the Persian Gulf near the Saudi island Al Arabiyah, about 60 miles northeast of Jubail.

Iranian F-4s were in use as of late 2014; the aircraft reportedly conducted air strikes on ISIS targets in the eastern Iraqi province of Diyala. At the 2024 Kish Air Show, three F-4Es from the 91st Tactical Combat Squadron, operating out of their home base in Bandar Abbas, performed formation and solo flyovers.

On 1 March 2026, F-4s were targeted by Israeli and American forces during the 2026 Iran war, with at least one F-4 claimed destroyed in an air strike in Tabriz.

==== Israel ====
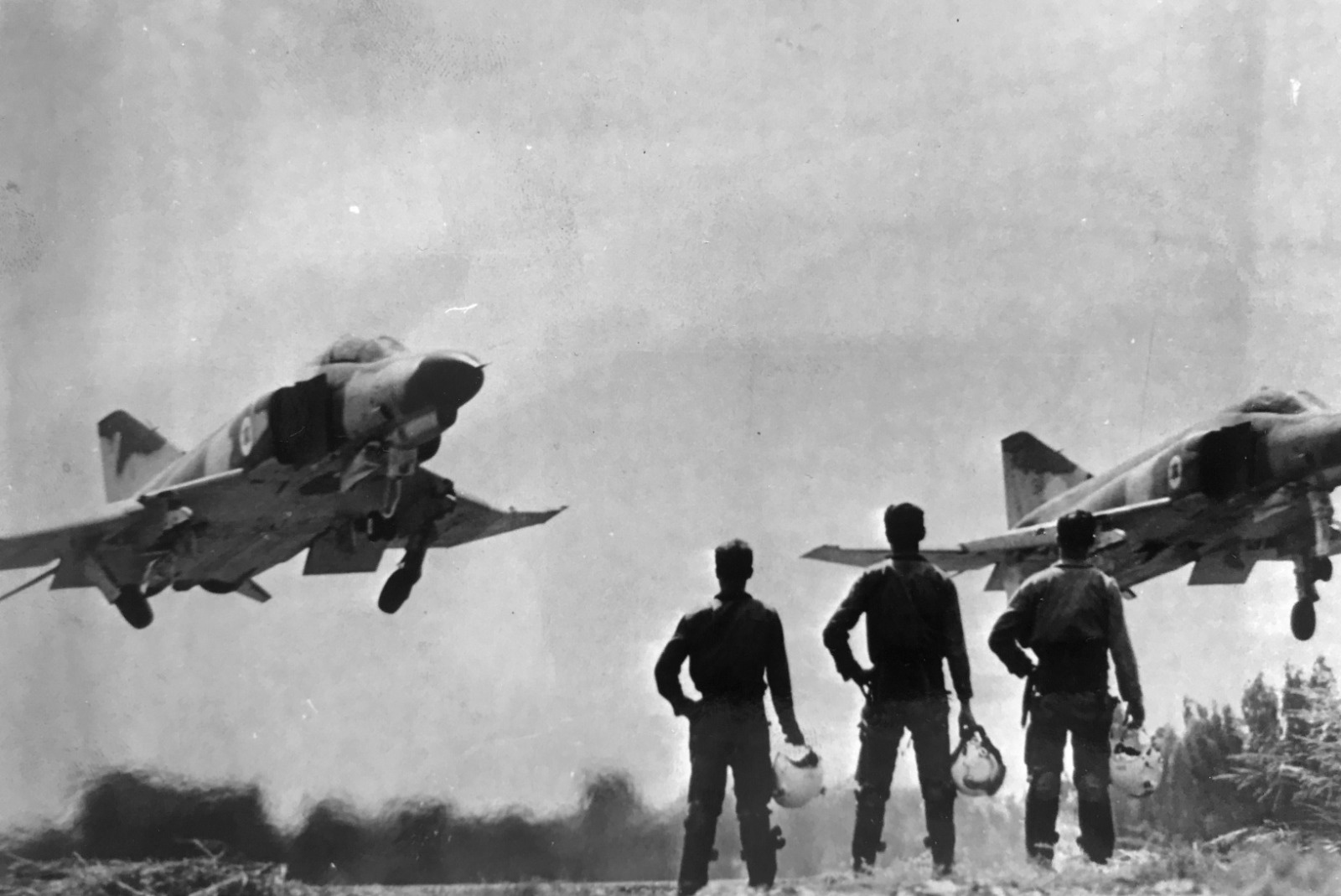
Israeli Air Force F-4Es taking off during the Yom Kippur War in October 1973

The Israeli Air Force acquired between 212 and 222 newly built and ex-USAF aircraft, and modified several as one-off special reconnaissance variants. The first F-4Es, nicknamed "Kurnass" (Sledgehammer), and RF-4Es, nicknamed "Orev" (Raven), were delivered in 1969 under the "Peace Echo I" program. Additional Phantoms arrived during the 1970s under "Peace Echo II" through "Peace Echo V" and "Nickel Grass" programs. Israeli Phantoms saw extensive combat during Arab–Israeli conflicts, first seeing action during the War of Attrition. In the 1980s, Israel began the "Kurnass 2000" modernization program which significantly updated avionics. The last Israeli F-4s were retired in 2004.

==== Japan ====
From 1968, the Japan Air Self-Defense Force (JASDF) purchased a total of 140 F-4EJ Phantoms without aerial refueling, AGM-12 Bullpup missile system, nuclear control system or ground attack capabilities. Mitsubishi built 138 under license in Japan and 14 unarmed reconnaissance RF-4Es were imported. One of the aircraft (17-8440) was the last of the 5,195 F-4 Phantoms to be produced. It was manufactured by Mitsubishi Heavy Industries on 21 May 1981. "The Final Phantom" served with 306th Tactical Fighter Squadron and later transferred to the 301st Tactical Fighter Squadron.

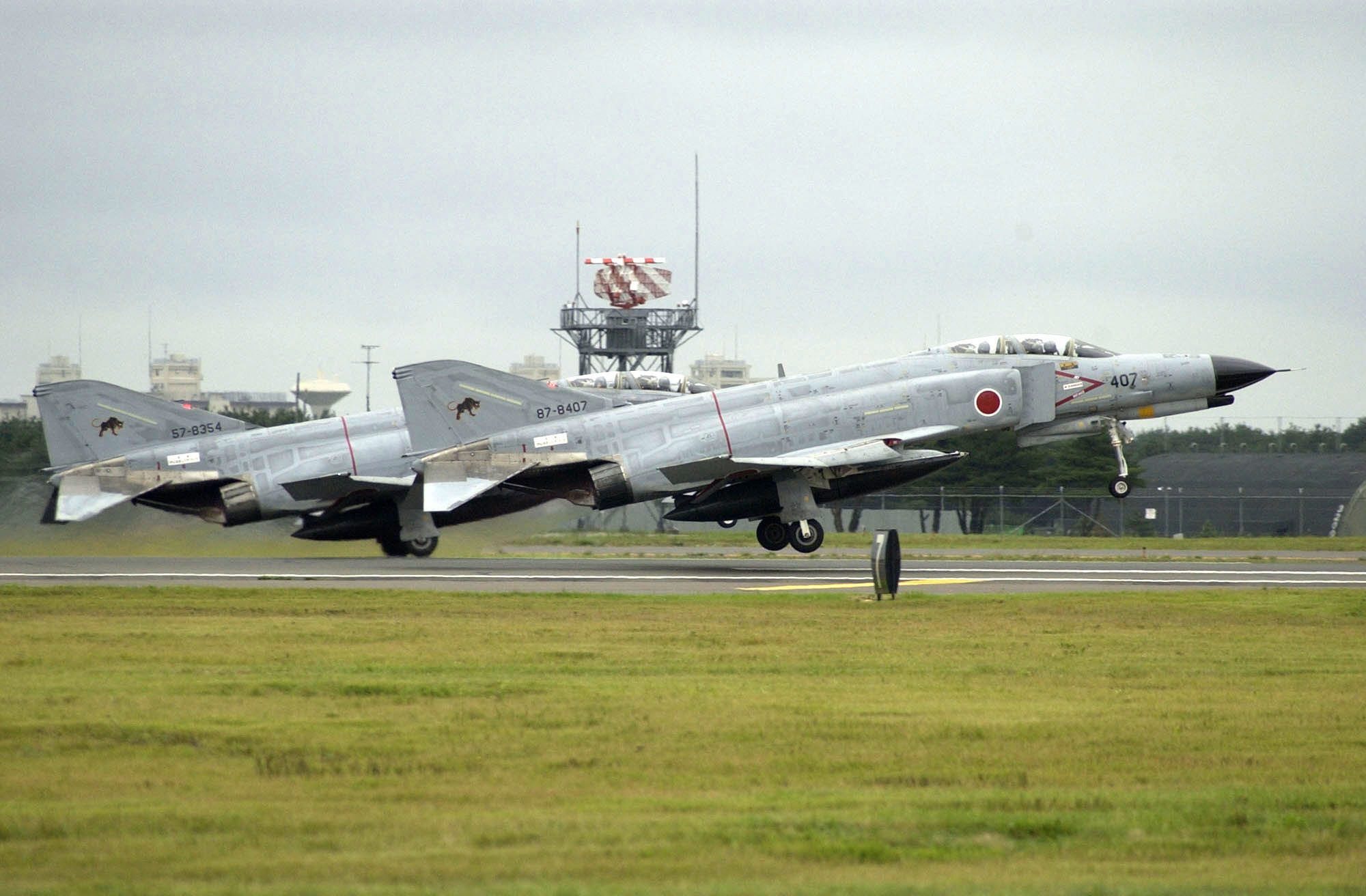
JASDF F-4EJ Kais (57-8354 and 87-8407) of 8 Hikōtai in gray air superiority paint scheme, 2002

Of these, 96 F-4EJs were modified to the F-4EJ Kai (改; modified) standard. 15 F-4EJ and F-4EJ Kai were converted to reconnaissance aircraft designated RF-4EJ. Japan had a fleet of 90 F-4s in service in 2007. After studying several replacement fighters the F-35A Lightning II was chosen in 2011. The 302nd Tactical Fighter Squadron became the first JASDF F-35 Squadron at Misawa Air Base when it converted from the F-4EJ Kai on 29 March 2019. The JASDF's sole aerial reconnaissance unit, the 501st Tactical Reconnaissance Squadron, retired their RF-4Es and RF-4EJs on 9 March 2020, and the unit itself dissolved on 26 March.

The 301st Tactical Fighter Squadron then became the sole user of the F-4EJ in the Air Defense Command, with their retirement originally scheduled in 2021 along with the unit's transition to the F-35A. However, on 20 November 2020, the 301st Tactical Fighter Squadron announced the earlier retirement of their remaining F-4EJs, concluding the Phantom's long-running career in the JASDF Air Defense Command. Although retirement was announced, the 301st TFS continued operations up until 10 December 2020, with the squadron's Phantoms being decommissioned on 14 December. Two F-4EJs and a F-4EJ Kai continued to be operated by the Air Development and Test Wing in Gifu Prefecture until their retirement on 17 March 2021, marking an end of Phantom operations in Japan.

==== South Korea ====
The Republic of Korea Air Force received its first batch of used USAF F-4D Phantoms in 1969 under the "Peace Spectator" program. The F-4Ds continued to be delivered until 1988. The "Peace Pheasant II" program also provided new-built and former USAF F-4Es. In 1975, South Korea fundraised to buy five new F-4 Phantoms with the money donated from South Korean citizens in a national fundraising drive set up to buy the jets (a necessity at the time as South Korea was a poor country and in the aftermath of the Korean War, needed the extra jets to defend against North Korea which had a larger air force back then). In total, the ROKAF operated 92 F-4Ds, 27 RF-4Cs, and 103 F-4Es. The last ROKAF F-4Es were retired on 7 June 2024.

==== Spain ====
The Spanish Air Force acquired its first batch of ex-USAF F-4C Phantoms in 1971 under the "Peace Alfa" program. Designated C.12, the aircraft were retired in 1989. At the same time, the air arm received a number of ex-USAF RF-4Cs, designated CR.12. In 1995–1996, these aircraft received extensive avionics upgrades. Spain retired its RF-4s in 2002.

==== Turkey ====
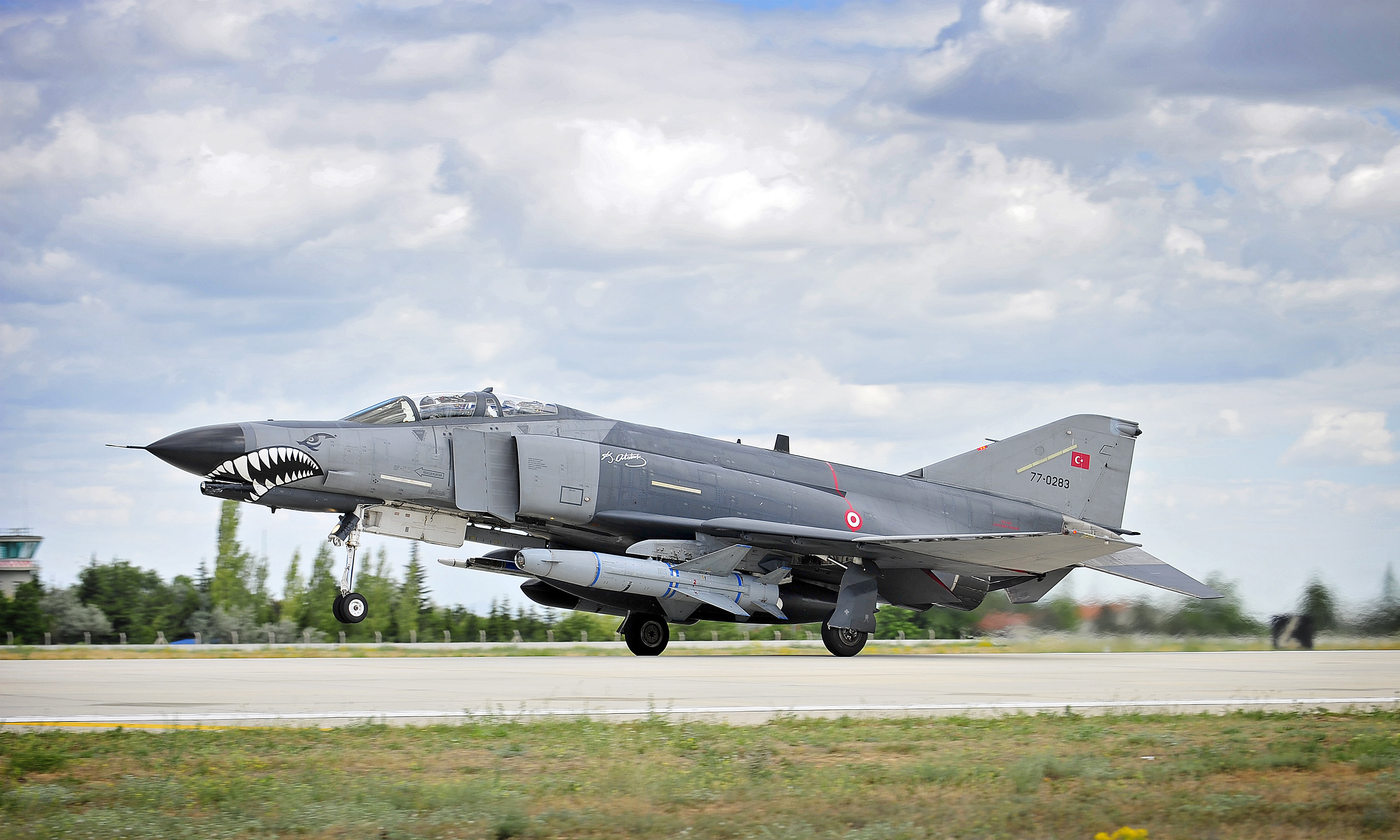
A Turkish Air Force F-4E Phantom II aircraft armed with Popeye missiles takes off from Third Air Force Base Konya, Turkey, during Exercise Anatolian Eagle.

The Turkish Air Force (TAF) received 40 F-4Es in 1974, with a further 32 F-4Es and 8 RF-4Es in 1977–78 under the "Peace Diamond III" program, followed by 40 ex-USAF aircraft in "Peace Diamond IV" in 1987, and a further 40 ex-U.S. Air National Guard Aircraft in 1991. A further 32 RF-4Es were transferred to Turkey after being retired by the Luftwaffe between 1992 and 1994. In 1995, Israel Aerospace Industries (IAI) implemented an upgrade similar to Kurnass 2000 on 54 Turkish F-4Es which were dubbed the F-4E 2020 Terminator. Turkish F-4s, and more modern F-16s have been used to strike Kurdish PKK bases in ongoing military operations in Northern Iraq. On 22 June 2012, a Turkish RF-4E was shot down by Syrian air defenses while flying a reconnaissance flight near the Turkish-Syrian border. Turkey has stated the reconnaissance aircraft was in international airspace when it was shot down, while Syrian authorities stated it was inside Syrian airspace. Turkish F-4s remained in use as of 2020, and it plans to fly them at least until 2030.

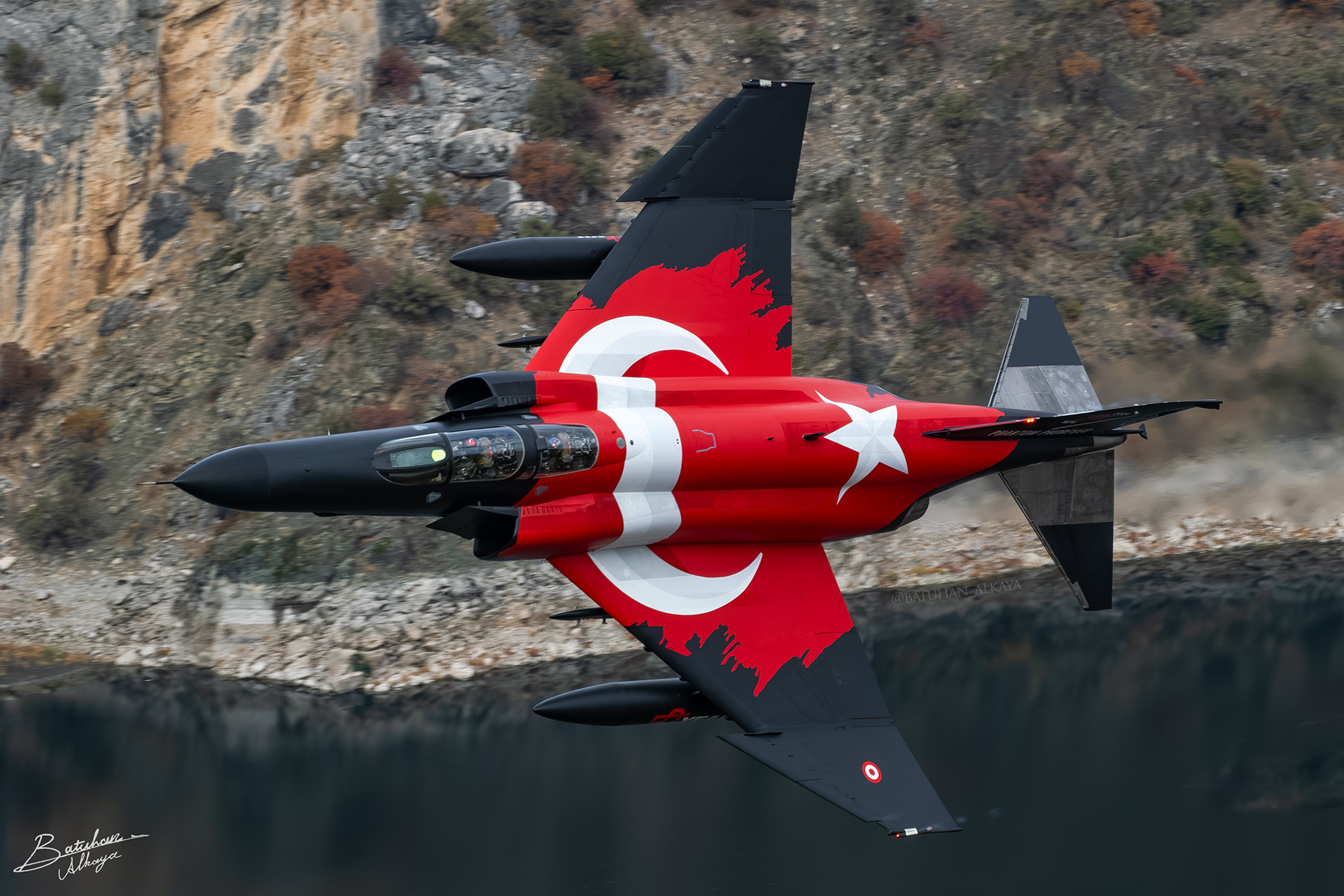
F-4E Phantom special livery for the 50th flight year of its service in the Turkish Air Force

On 24 February 2015, two RF-4Es crashed in the Malatya region in southeastern Turkey under unknown circumstances, killing both crewmembers of each aircraft. On 5 March 2015, an F-4E-2020 crashed in central Anatolia killing both crew. After the recent accidents, the TAF withdrew RF-4Es from active service. Turkey was reported to have used F-4 jets to attack PKK separatists and the ISIS capital on 19 September 2015. The Turkish Air Force has reportedly used the F-4E 2020s against the more recent Third Phase of the PKK conflict on heavy bombardment missions into Iraq on 15 November 2015, 12 January 2016, and 12 March 2016.

==== United Kingdom ====
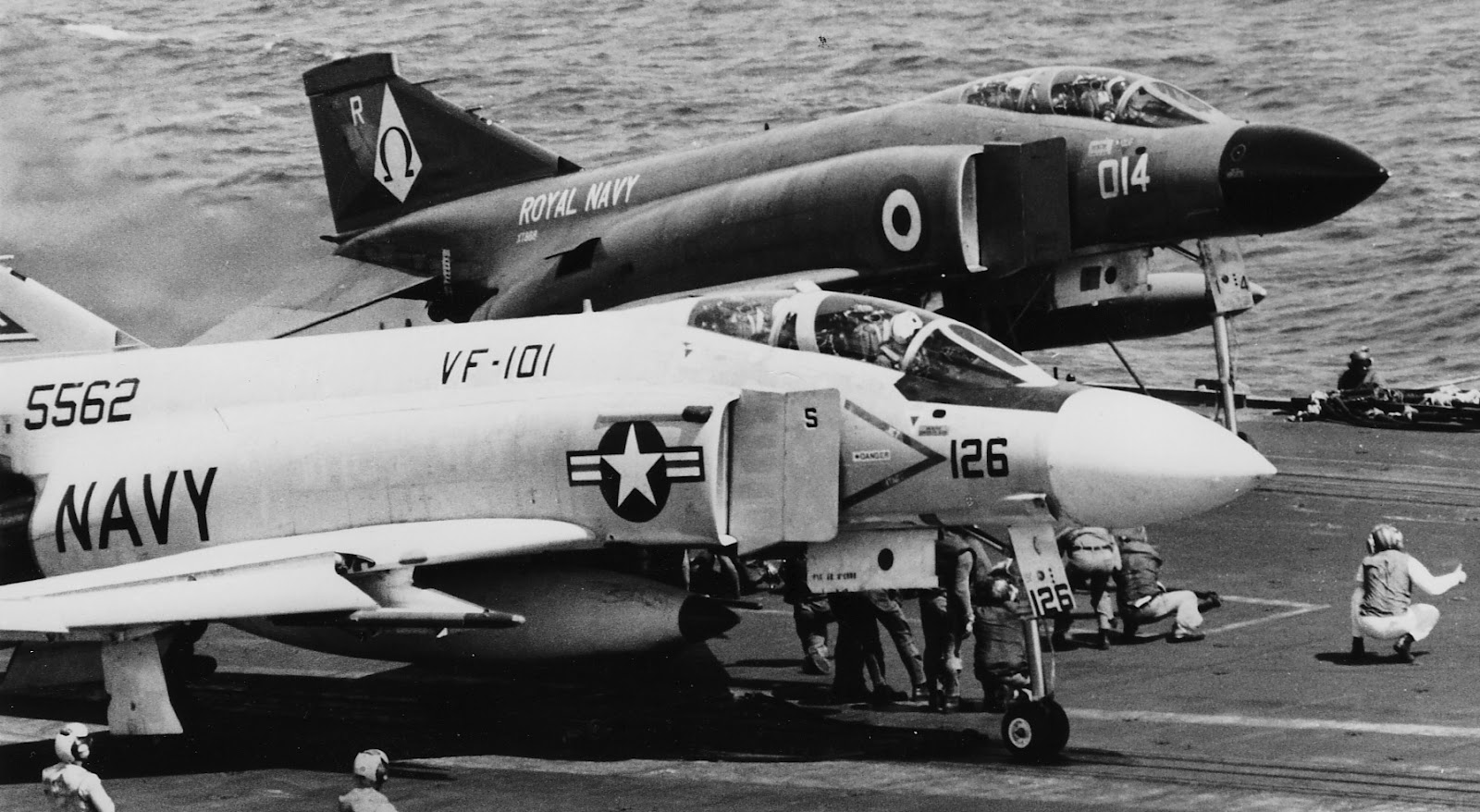
An F-4J of the U.S. Navy (foreground), alongside an F-4K of the Fleet Air Arm (background) wait to be catapulted from USS Independence, March 1975; one of the major differences can be seen by the higher degree of the British aircraft's extendable nose wheel. Both variants were eventually used by the Royal Air Force

The United Kingdom bought versions based on the U.S. Navy's F-4J for use with the Royal Air Force and the Royal Navy's Fleet Air Arm. The UK was the only country outside the United States to operate the Phantom at sea, with them operating from HMS Ark Royal. The main differences were the use of the British Rolls-Royce Spey engines and of British-made avionics. The RN and RAF versions were given the designation F-4K and F-4M respectively, and entered service with the British military aircraft designations Phantom FG.1 (fighter/ground attack) and Phantom FGR.2 (fighter/ground attack/reconnaissance).

Initially, the FGR.2 was used in the ground attack and reconnaissance role, primarily with RAF Germany, while 43 Squadron was formed in the air defense role using the FG.1s that had been intended for the Fleet Air Arm for use aboard HMS Eagle. The superiority of the Phantom over the English Electric Lightning in terms of both range and weapons system capability, combined with the successful introduction of the SEPECAT Jaguar, meant that, during the mid-1970s, most of the ground attack Phantoms in Germany were redeployed to the UK to replace air defense Lightning squadrons. A second RAF squadron, 111 Squadron, was formed on the FG.1 in 1979 after the disbandment of 892 NAS.

In 1982, during the Falklands War, three Phantom FGR2s of No. 29 Squadron were on active Quick Reaction Alert duty on Ascension Island to protect the base from air attack. After the Falklands War, 15 upgraded ex-USN F-4Js, known as the F-4J(UK) entered RAF service to compensate for one interceptor squadron redeployed to the Falklands.

Around 15 RAF squadrons received various marks of Phantom, many of them based in West Germany. The first to be equipped was No. 228 Operational Conversion Unit at RAF Coningsby in August 1968. One noteworthy operator was No. 43 Squadron where Phantom FG1s remained the squadron equipment for 20 years, arriving in September 1969 and departing in July 1989. During this period the squadron was based at Leuchars.

The interceptor Phantoms were replaced by the Panavia Tornado F3 from the late 1980s onwards. Originally to be used until 2003, it was set back to 1992 due to restructuring of the British Armed Forces and the last combat British Phantoms were retired in October 1992 when No. 74(F) Squadron was disbanded. Phantom FG.1 XT597 was the last British Phantom to be retired on 28 January 1994, it was used as a test jet by the Aeroplane and Armament Experimental Establishment for its whole service life.

=== Civilian use ===
In 1988, Sandia National Laboratories mounted an F-4 on a "rocket sled", then crashed it into reinforced concrete to learn about the collision of aircraft with structures such as a nuclear power plant.

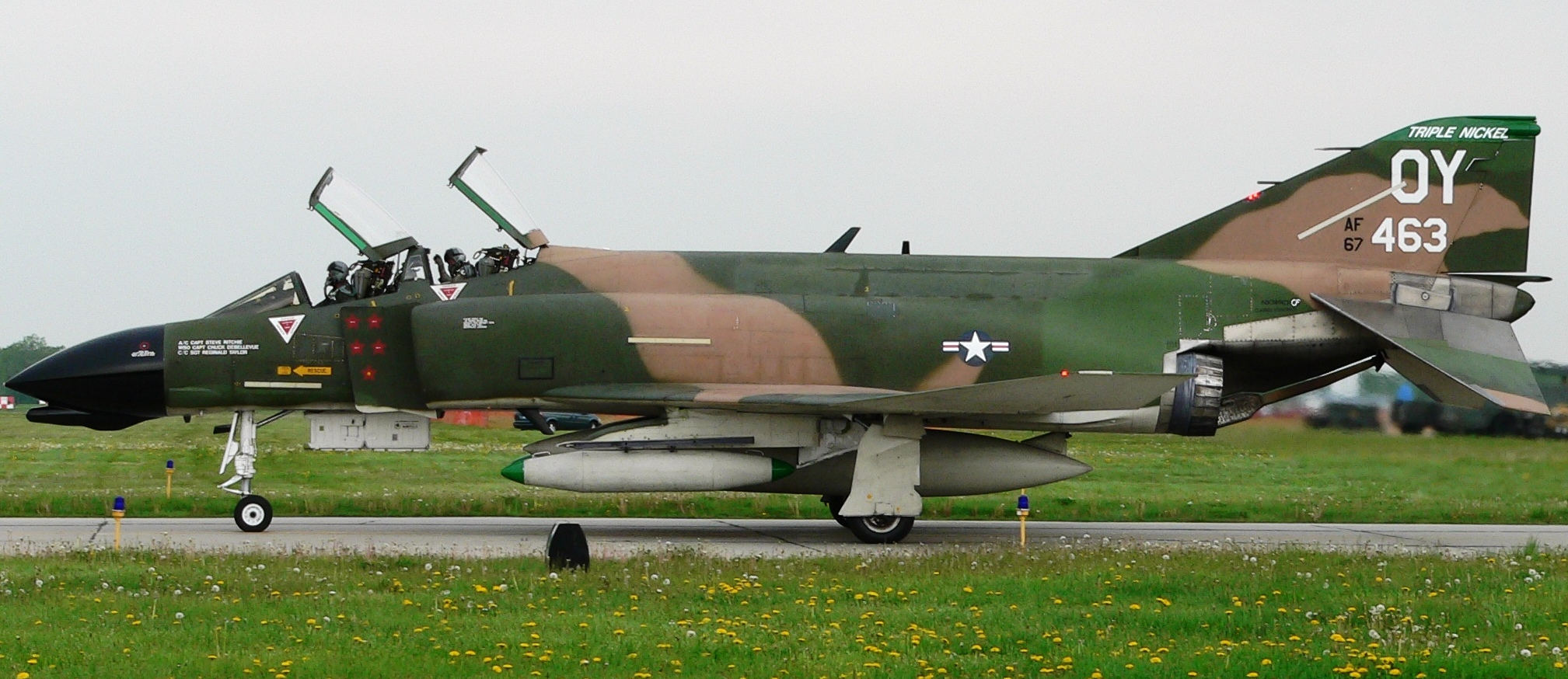
The Collings Foundation F-4D Phantom II, with Vietnam-era "Ritchie/DeBellevue" markings, taxis at Selfridge ANGB, May 2005

An F-4D (civilian registration NX749CF) is operated by the Massachusetts-based non-profit organization Collings Foundation as a "living history" exhibit. Funds to maintain and operate the aircraft, which is based in Houston, Texas, are raised through donations and sponsorships from public and commercial parties.

In the 1960s, NASA used the F-4 to photograph and film Titan II missiles after their launch from Cape Canaveral after finding the Lockheed F-104 Starfighter inadequate. Jack Petry, a retired U.S. Air Force colonel, said he put his F-4 into a Mach 1.2 dive synchronized to the launch countdown, then "walked the [rocket's] contrail". Petry's Phantom stayed with the Titan for 90 seconds, reaching 68,000 feet, then broke away as the missile continued into space.

NASA's Flight Research Center acquired an F-4A on 3 December 1965. It made 55 flights flying chase on X-15 missions and lifting body flights. The F-4 also supported a biomedical monitoring program involving 1,000 flights by NASA Flight Research Center aerospace research pilots and students of the USAF Aerospace Research Pilot School flying high-performance aircraft. The pilots were instrumented to record accurate and reliable data of electrocardiogram, respiration rate, and normal acceleration. In 1967, the Phantom supported a brief military-inspired program to determine whether an airplane's sonic boom could be directed and whether it could be used as a weapon of sorts, or at least an annoyance. NASA also flew an F-4C in a spanwise blowing study from 1983 to 1985, after which it was returned.

== Culture ==
=== Legacy ===
"The Fabulous Phantom II" 5000th F-4 Phantom, McDonnell Douglas promotional film

The F-4 Phantom II's long service life and widespread use in multiple roles have cemented its status as a symbol of military aviation. With 5,195 Phantom II aircraft produced over more than 20 years in multiple variants, the F-4 achieved huge commercial success as the best-selling supersonic fighter in U.S. history. It currently remains the latest, and final aircraft model to produce "ace-status" for a member of any branch of the United States armed forces.

=== Nicknames ===
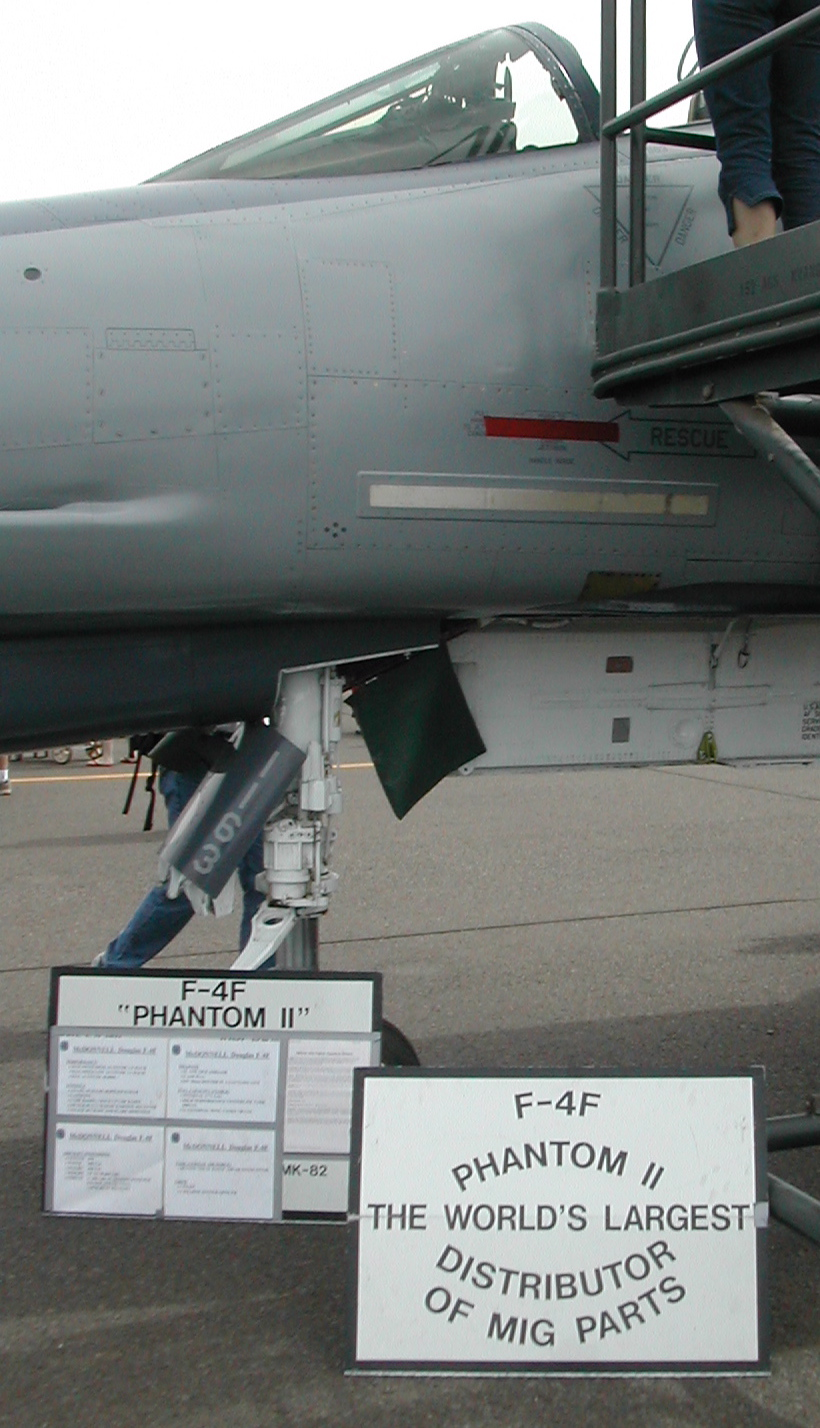
An F-4F on display described as the "World's largest distributor of MiG parts", because of the high number of this type of enemy aircraft shot down

The Phantom gathered a number of nicknames during its career. Some of these names included "Snoopy", "Rhino", "Double Ugly", "Old Smokey", the "Flying Anvil", "Flying Footlocker", "Flying Brick", "Lead Sled", the "Big Iron Sled", and the "St. Louis Slugger" (owing to it being produced in St. Louis). In recognition of its record of downing large numbers of Soviet-built MiGs, it was called the "World's Leading Distributor of MiG Parts". As a reflection of excellent performance in spite of its bulk, the F-4 was dubbed "the triumph of thrust over aerodynamics." German Luftwaffe crews called their F-4s the Eisenschwein ("Iron Pig"), Fliegender Ziegelstein ("Flying Brick") and Luftverteidigungsdiesel ("Air Defense Diesel"). In the RAF it was most commonly referred to as "The Toom" (not tomb). Whilst the Turkish Air Force crewmen nicknamed it as Baba ("Father").

=== Reputation ===
Imitating the spelling of the aircraft's name, McDonnell issued a series of patches. Pilots became "Phantom Phlyers", backseaters became "Phantom Pherrets", fans of the F-4 "Phantom Phanatics", and call it the "Phabulous Phantom". Ground crewmen who worked on the aircraft are known as "Phantom Phixers".

Several active websites are devoted to sharing information on the F-4, and the aircraft is grudgingly admired as brutally effective by those who have flown it. Colonel (Ret.) Chuck DeBellevue reminisced, "The F-4 Phantom was the last plane that looked like it was made to kill somebody. It was a beast. It could go through a flock of birds and kick out barbeque from the back." It had "a reputation of being a clumsy bruiser reliant on brute engine power and obsolete weapons technology."

=== The Spook ===
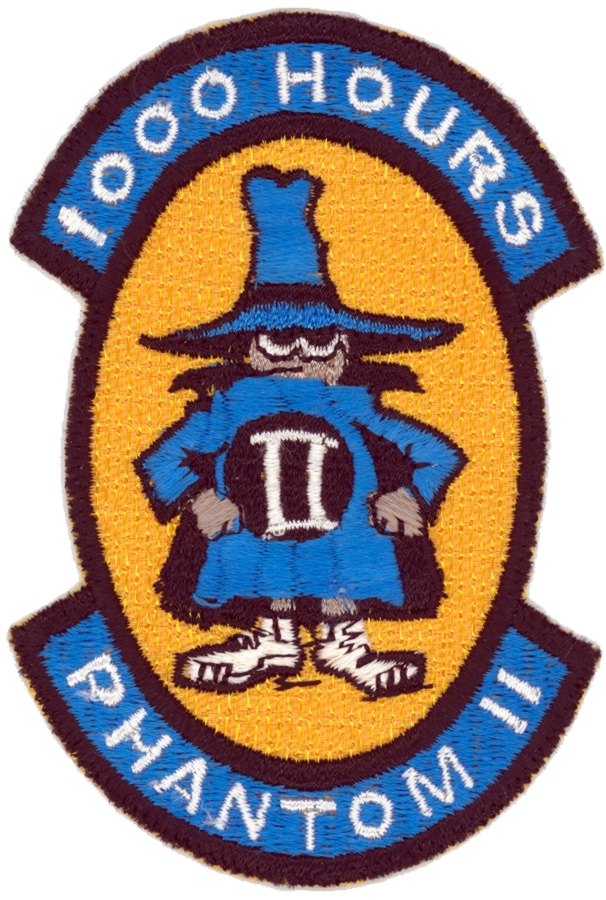
The Spook

The aircraft's emblem is a whimsical cartoon ghost called "The Spook", which was created by McDonnell Douglas technical artist, Anthony "Tony" Wong, for shoulder patches. The name "Spook" was coined by the crews of either the 12th Tactical Fighter Wing or the 4453rd Combat Crew Training Wing at MacDill AFB. The figure is ubiquitous, appearing on many items associated with the F-4. The Spook has followed the Phantom around the world adopting local fashions; for example, the British adaptation of the U.S. "Phantom Man" is a Spook that sometimes wears a bowler hat and smokes a pipe.

== Variants ==
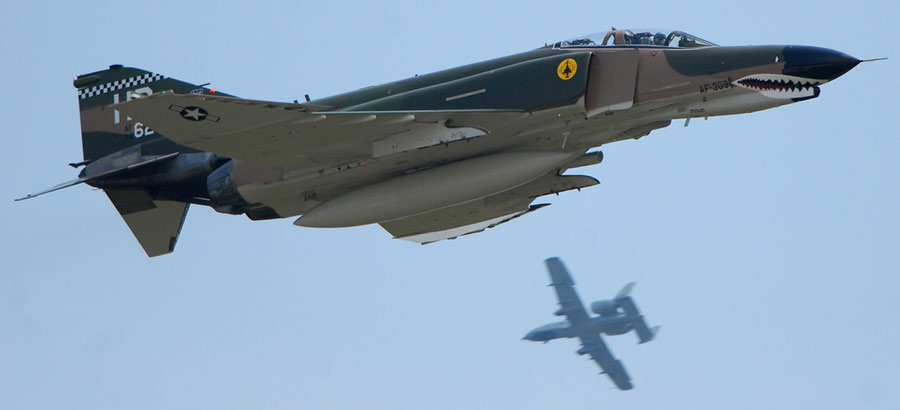
QF-4E AF Serial No. 74-1626 at McGuire AFB in May 2007 with an A-10 in the background

F-4A, B, J, N and S
Variants for the U.S. Navy and the U.S. Marine Corps. F-4B was upgraded to F-4N, and F-4J was upgraded to F-4S.
F-110 (original USAF designation for F-4C), F-4C, D and E
Variants for the U.S. Air Force. F-4E introduced an internal M61 Vulcan cannon. The F-4D and E were the most numerously produced, widely exported, and also extensively used under the Semi Automatic Ground Environment (SAGE) U.S. air defense system. It was later given the smokeless General Electric J79-GE-17C/E which removed the trail of black soot in flight.
F-4G Wild Weasel V
A dedicated Suppression of Enemy Air Defenses (SEAD) variant for the U.S. Air Force with updated radar and avionics, converted from F-4E. The designation F-4G was applied earlier to an entirely different U.S. Navy Phantom.
F-4K and M
Variants for the Royal Navy and Royal Air Force, respectively, built with Rolls-Royce Spey turbofan engines.
F-4EJ and RF-4EJ
Simplified F-4E exported to and license-built in Japan. Some modified for reconnaissance role, carrying photographic or electronic reconnaissance pods and designated RF-4EJ.
F-4F
Simplified F-4E exported to Germany.
QRF-4C, QF-4B, E, G, N and S
Retired aircraft converted into remote-controlled target drones used for weapons and defensive systems research by USAF and USN / USMC.
RF-4B, C, and E
Tactical reconnaissance variants.

F-4 Phantom Comparisons

F-4E Phantom (US/Foreign export)

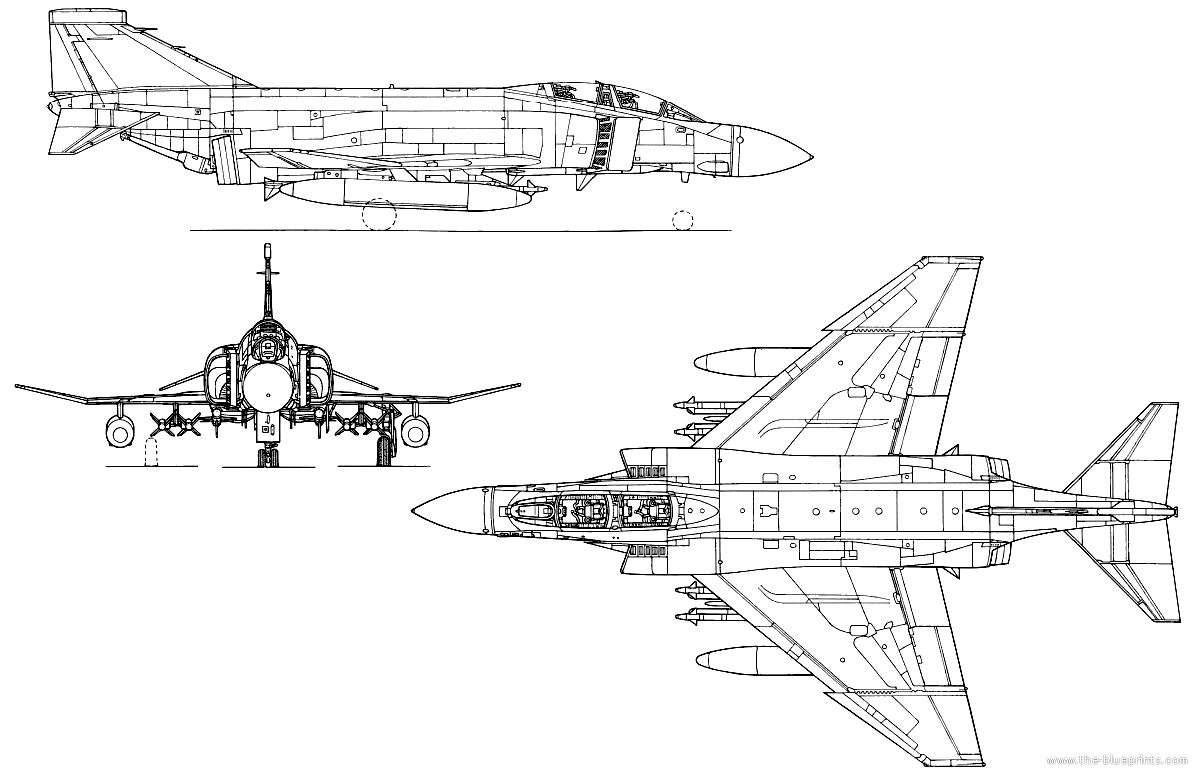
F-4K Phantom (RN FAA/RAF only)

== Operators ==
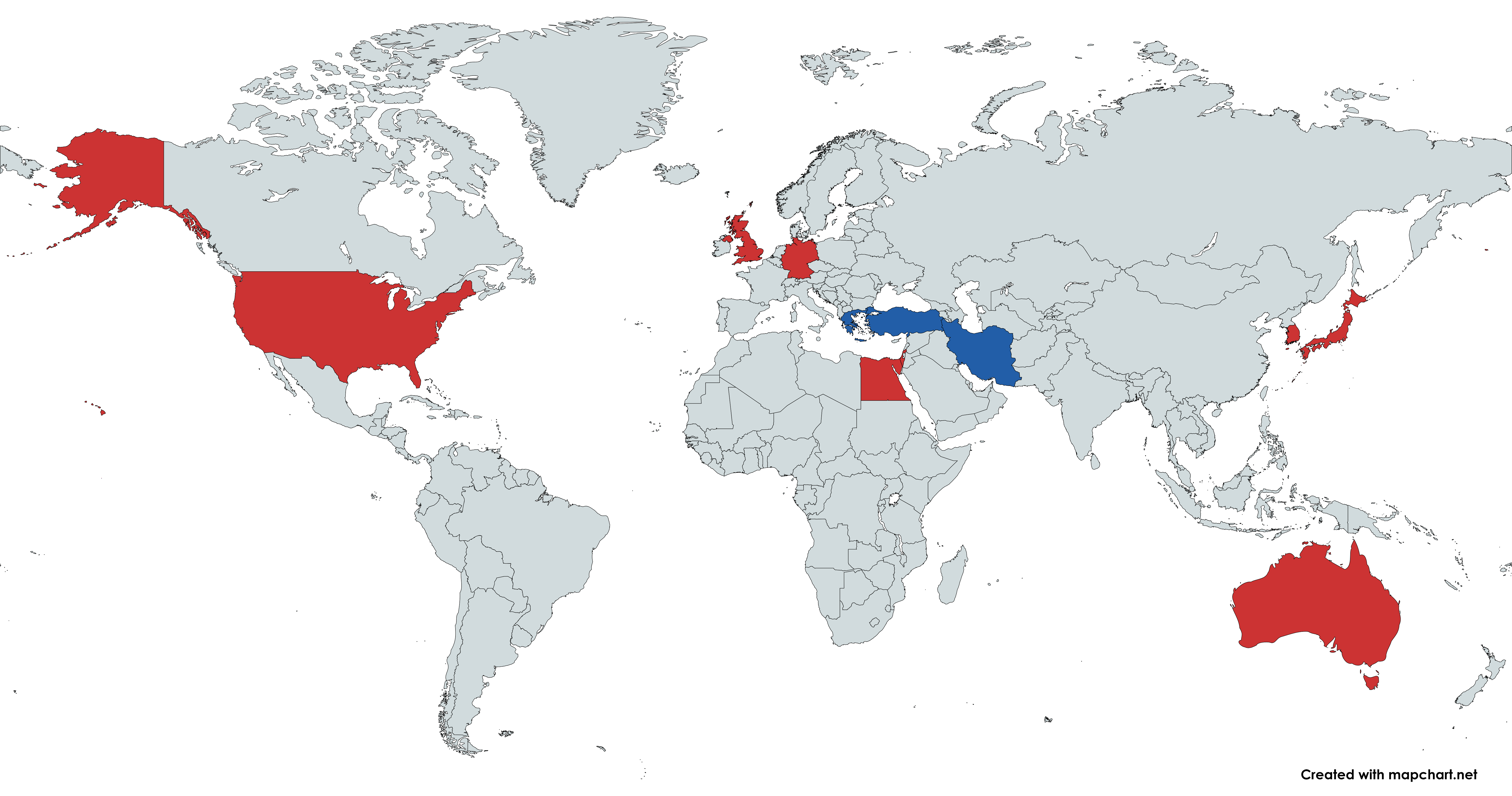
Operators: Current Former

=== Current ===
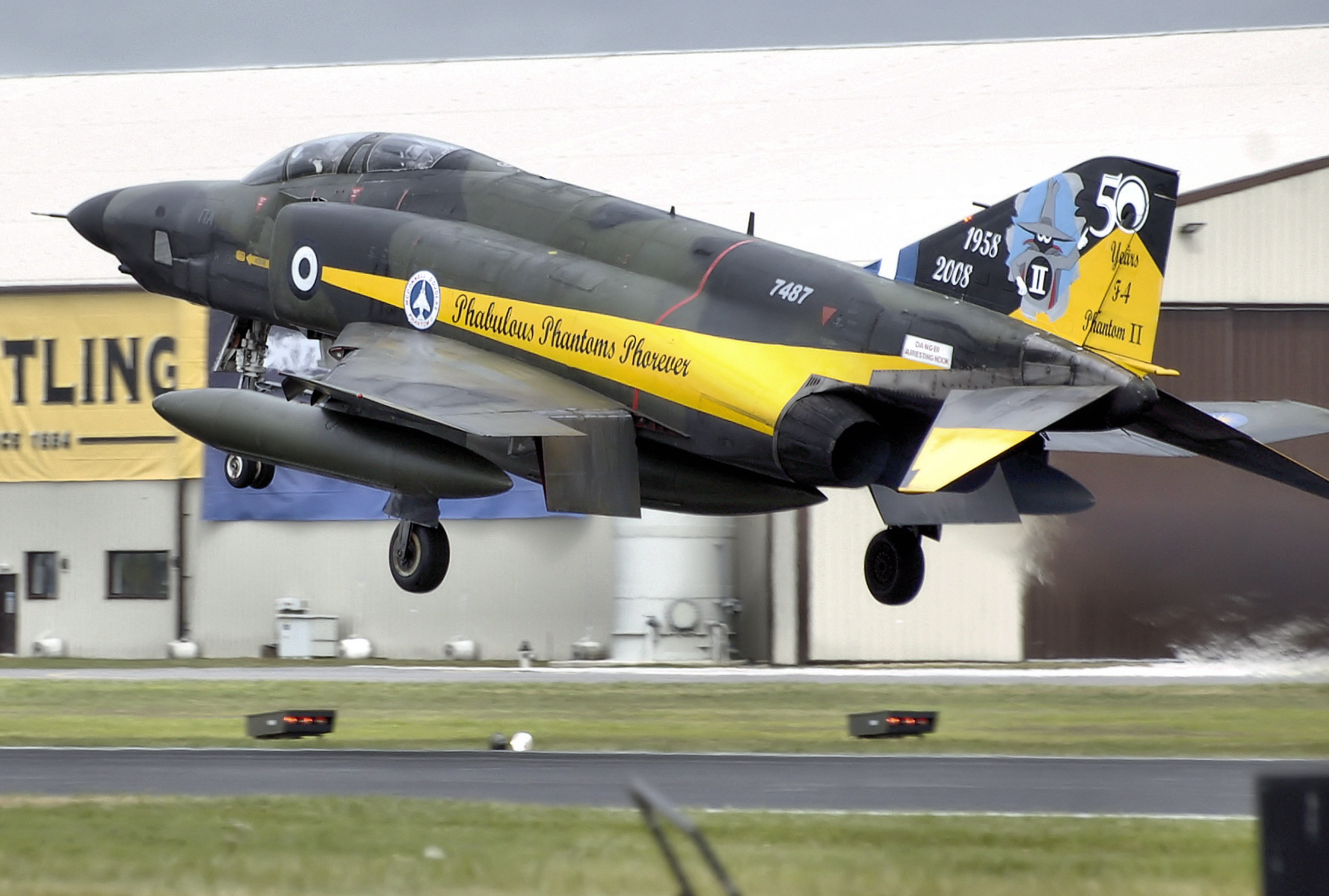
Hellenic Air Force RF-4E Phantom II in a special color scheme, lands at RIAT 2008, UK

Greece

- Hellenic Air Force – 16 F-4E AUPs (Peace Icarus 2000 variant) in service as of September 2026
  - Andravida Air Base, Elis
    - 338th Fighter-Bomber Squadron

Iran

- Islamic Republic of Iran Air Force – 60 F-4D, F-4E, and RF-4Es in service as of 2021
  - Bandar Abbas Air Base, Hormozgan Province
    - 91st Tactical Fighter Squadron (F-4E)
  - Bushehr Air Base, Bushehr Province
    - 61st Tactical Fighter Squadron (F-4E)
  - Chabahar Konarak Air Base, Sistan and Baluchestan Province
    - 101st Tactical Fighter Squadron (F-4D)
  - Hamadan Air Base, Hamadan Province
    - 31st Tactical Reconnaissance Squadron (RF-4E)
    - 31st Tactical Fighter Squadron (F-4E)

Turkey

- Turkish Air Force – 30 F-4E 2020 Terminators in service as of 2024
  - Eskişehir Air Base, Eskişehir Province
    - 111 Filo

=== Former operators ===
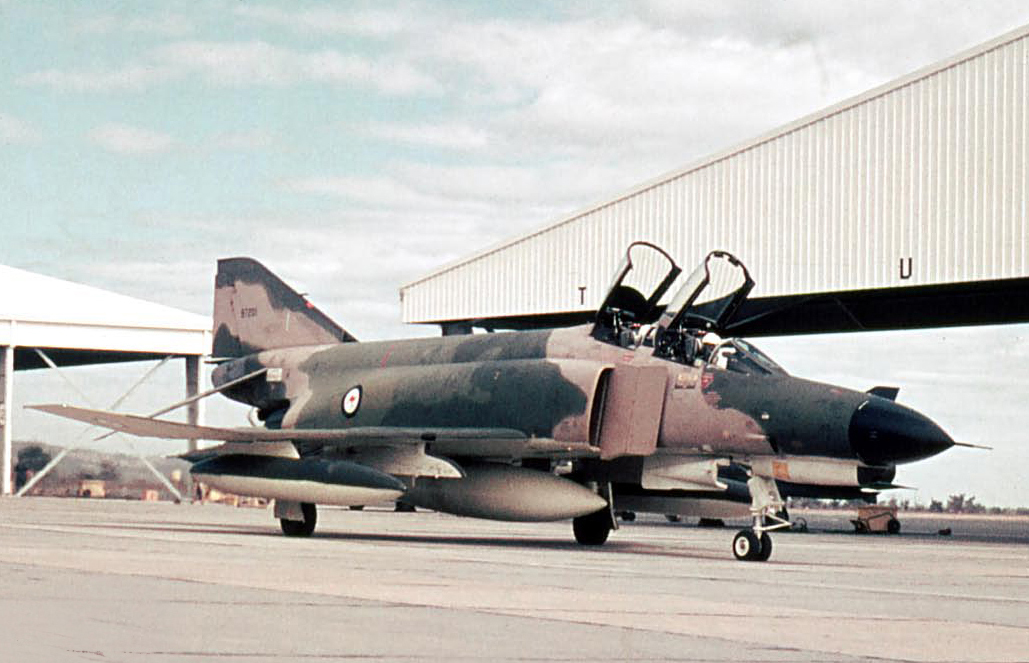
A Royal Australian Air Force F-4E Phantom II at RAAF Base Pearce in 1971

Australia

- Royal Australian Air Force (24 leased F-4E aircraft in service between 1970 and 1973 as a stop-gap capability in the transition from Canberra bombers to the F-111C)

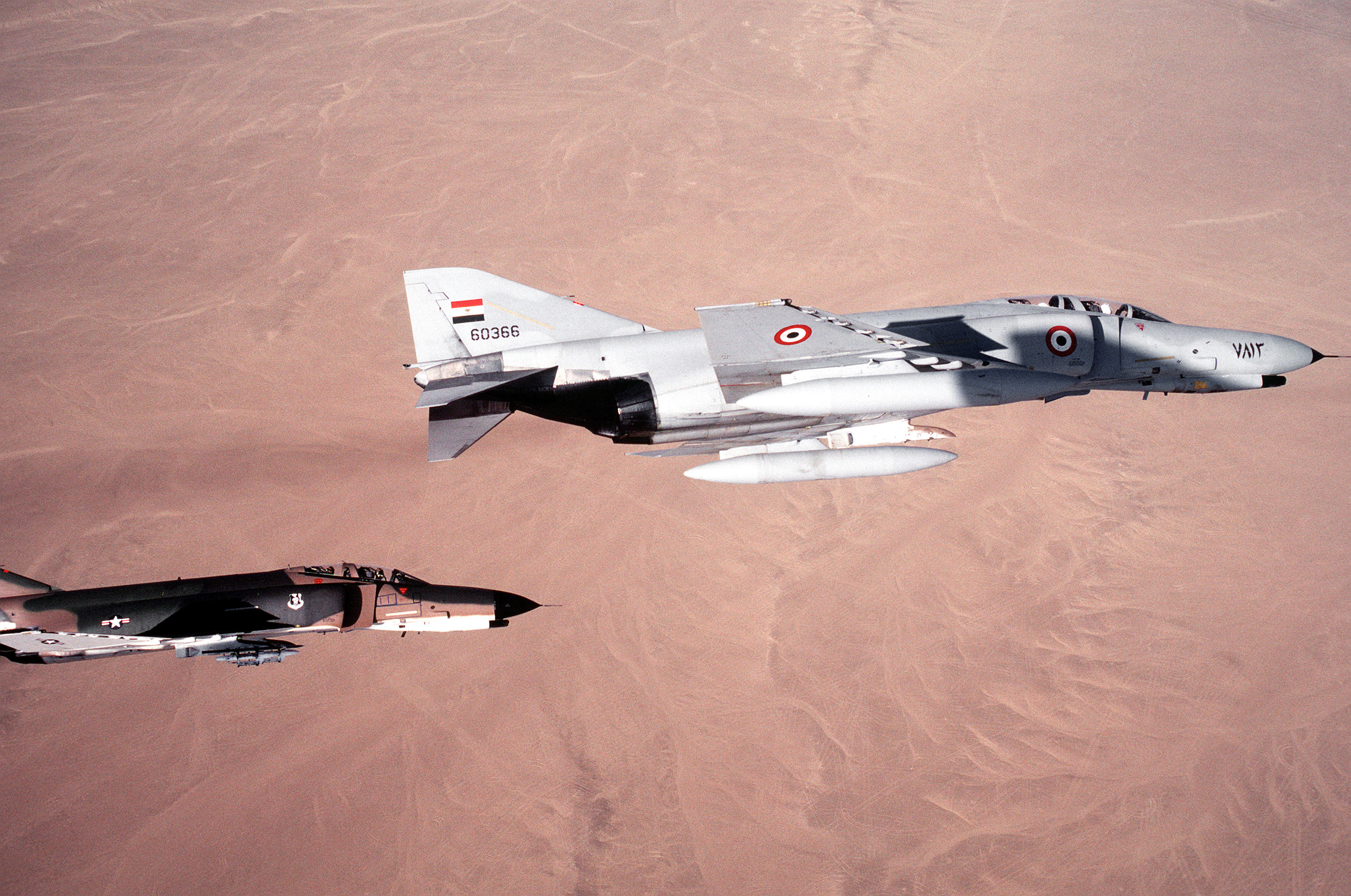
Egyptian Air Force F-4E Phantom IIs of the 222nd Tactical Fighter Brigade in formation with a U.S. Air Force 347th Tactical Fighter Wing F-4E Phantom II during exercise Proud Phantom

Egypt

- Egyptian Air Force (F-4E 1977 to 2020)

Germany

- German Air Force (RF-4E 1971 to 1994; F-4F 1973 to 2013; F-4E 1978 to 1992)

Greece

- Hellenic Air Force (RF-4E 1978 to 2017)

Israel

- Israeli Air Force (F-4E 1969 to 2004; RF-4C 1970 to 1971; RF-4E 1971 to 2004)

Iran

- All passed to IRIAF

Japan

- Japan Air Self-Defense Force (F-4EJ 1971 to 2021; RF-4E 1974 to 2020; RF-4EJ 1992 to 2020)

South Korea

- Republic of Korea Air Force (F-4D 1969 to 2010; RF-4C 1989 to 2014; F-4E 1977 to 2024)

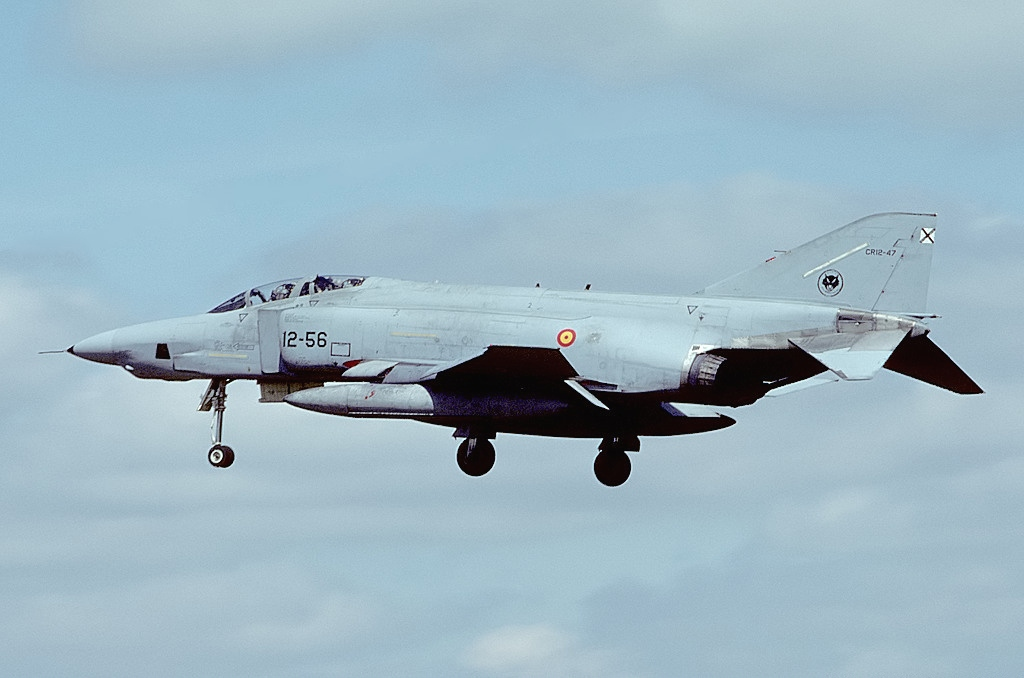
Spanish Air Force RF-4C Phantom II, 15 June 1993

Spain

- Spanish Air Force (F-4C 1971 to 1990; RF-4C 1978 to 2002)

Turkey

- Turkish Air Force (RF-4E 1980 to 2015)

United Kingdom

- Aeroplane and Armament Experimental Establishment (F-4K 1970 to 1994)
- Fleet Air Arm (F-4K 1968 to 1978)
- Royal Air Force (F-4M 1968 to 1992; F-4K 1969 to 1990; F-4J(UK) 1984 to 1991)

United States

- NASA (F-4A 1965 to 1967; F-4C 1983 to 1985)
- United States Air Force (F-4B 1963 to 1964; F-4C 1964 to 1989; RF-4C 1964 to 1995; F-4D 1965 to 1992; F-4E 1967 to 1991; F-4G 1978 to 1996; QF-4 1997 to 2016)
- United States Marine Corps (F-4B 1962 to 1979; RF-4B 1965 to 1990; F-4J 1967 to 1984; F-4N 1973 to 1985; F-4S 1978 to 1992)
- United States Navy (F-4A 1960 to 1968; F-4B 1961 to 1974; F-4J 1966 to 1982; F-4N 1973 to 1984; F-4S 1979 to 1987; QF-4 1983 to 2004)

=== Privately owned ===
- Platinum Fighters Sale – 1 F4H-1F

== Notable accidents ==
- On 6 June 1971, Hughes Airwest Flight 706, a McDonnell Douglas DC-9-31 collided in mid-air with a United States Marine Corps F-4B Phantom above the San Gabriel Mountains, while en route from Los Angeles International Airport to Salt Lake City. All 49 on board the DC-9 were killed, while the pilot of the F-4B was unable to eject and died when the aircraft crashed shortly afterwards. The F-4B's Radar Intercept Officer successfully ejected from the plane and parachuted to safety, being the sole survivor of the incident.
- On 9 August 1974, a Royal Air Force Phantom FGR2 was involved in a fatal collision with a civilian PA-25-235 Pawnee crop-sprayer over Norfolk, England.
- On 1 October 1976, an RF-4C Phantom II impacted terrain on Holston Mountain near the Holston Mountain VORTAC, just north of Elizabethton, TN. Both crew members were killed.
- On 17 August 1978, during a training exercise over the Mediterranean Sea, a US Navy F-4 shot down another US Navy F-4 with an AIM-9H. The pilots of the downed aircraft ejected and were recovered.
- On 25 May 1982, a Royal Air Force McDonnell Douglas Phantom (tail number XV422) accidentally fired an air-to-air missile during a simulated training exercise and shot down a Royal Air Force SEPECAT Jaguar of 14 Squadron, which was returning to its base at RAF Brüggen in Germany.
- On 21 March 1987, Captain Dean Paul Martin, a pilot in the 163d Tactical Fighter Group of the California Air National Guard and son of entertainer Dean Martin, crashed his F-4C into San Gorgonio Mountain, California, shortly after departure from March Air Force Base. Both Martin and his weapon systems officer (WSO) were killed.
- On 22 September 1987, a US Air Force RF-4C Phantom II was shot down by a US Navy F-14 Tomcat during training NATO Exercise Display Determination 87 over the Mediterranean. The RF-4C was conducting a simulated attack on USS Saratoga when the F-14 pilot became confused and launched a live AIM-9 Sidewinder. The RF-4C crew ejected and were recovered.
- On 30 January 2023, a Greek Air Force F-4E Phantom II crashed into the Ionian Sea. The aircraft was conducting a training exercise when it crashed 46 km south of the Andravida Air Base. The pilot and co-pilot were killed in the crash.
- On 5 September 2026, a Hellenic Air Force F-4 Phantom II of the 338th Fighter-Bomber Squadron crashed into a cliff before attempting a high speed low flyby over the southernmost runway at the Tanagra Air Base during the annual Athens Flying Week airshow. Both pilots were found deceased at the crash site.

== Aircraft on display ==
As a result of its extensive number of operators and large number of aircraft produced, a significant number of F-4 Phantom IIs of a variety of variants have been preserved in museums and other locations around the world.

== Gallery ==
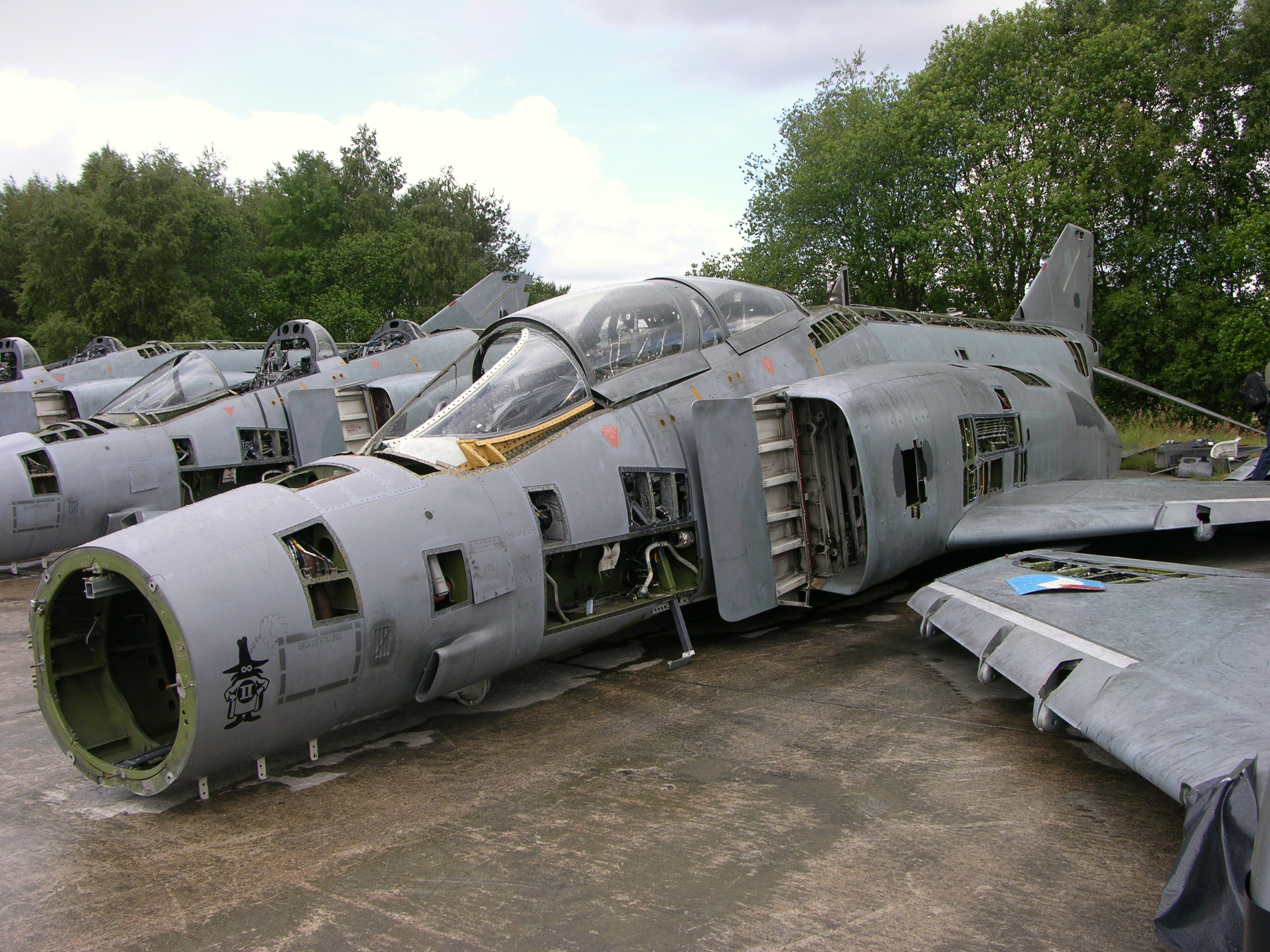
Structural view of partially disassembled German F-4 Phantoms (2009).

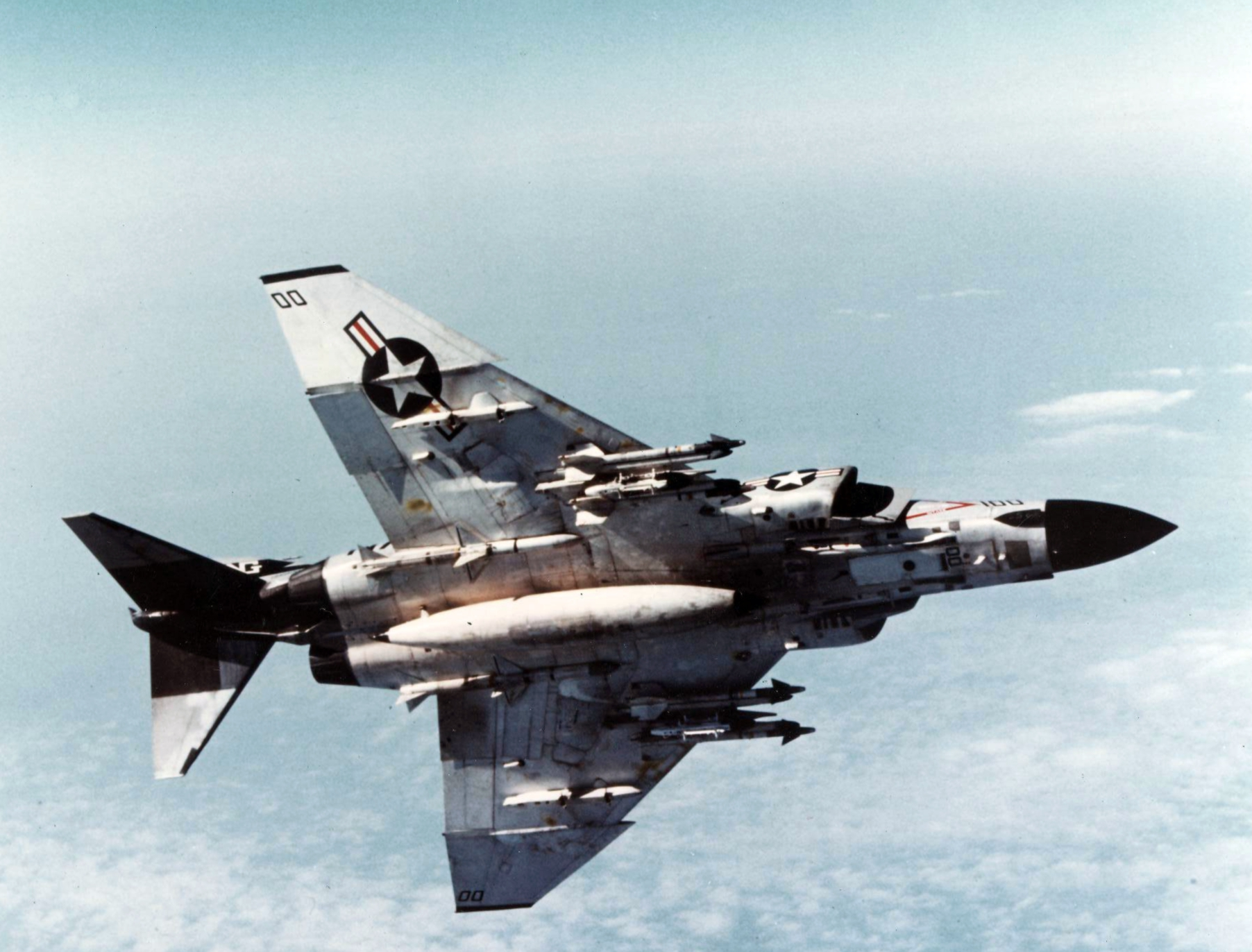
VF-96 F-4J "Showtime 100" armed with Sidewinder and Sparrow missiles (1972).

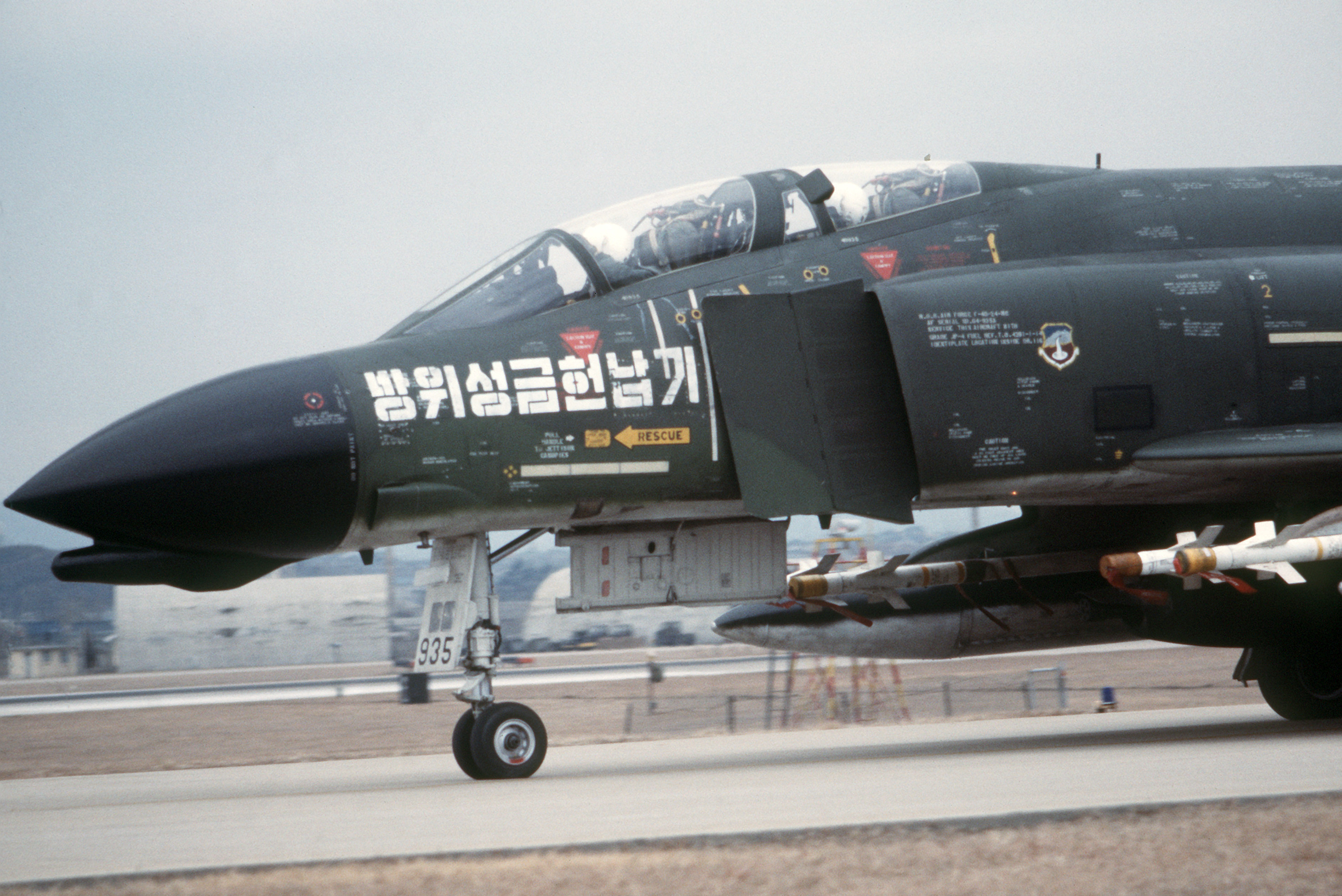
A Republic of Korea Air Force F-4D Phantom II armed with AIM-9 missiles at Daegu Air Base, 1979.

=== Video resources ===
"The Record Breaking Phantom II" Mcdonnell aircraft promotional Film.

"The F-4 Phantom Joins the Fleet" (1962).

F-4J Phantom II AWG-10 guided missile trials at Pt. Mugu, California.

"Ambassadors in Blue" (1971) F-4E Phantom USAF Thunderbirds promotional film.

USAF F-4 Phantom II conventional weapons delivery dive-bombing training film.

USAF tactical weapons in South-East Asia.

USAF ADC News Digest, No. 94 57th Fighter Interceptor Squadron transition from F-102 to F-4 Phantom II

== Specifications (F-4E) ==
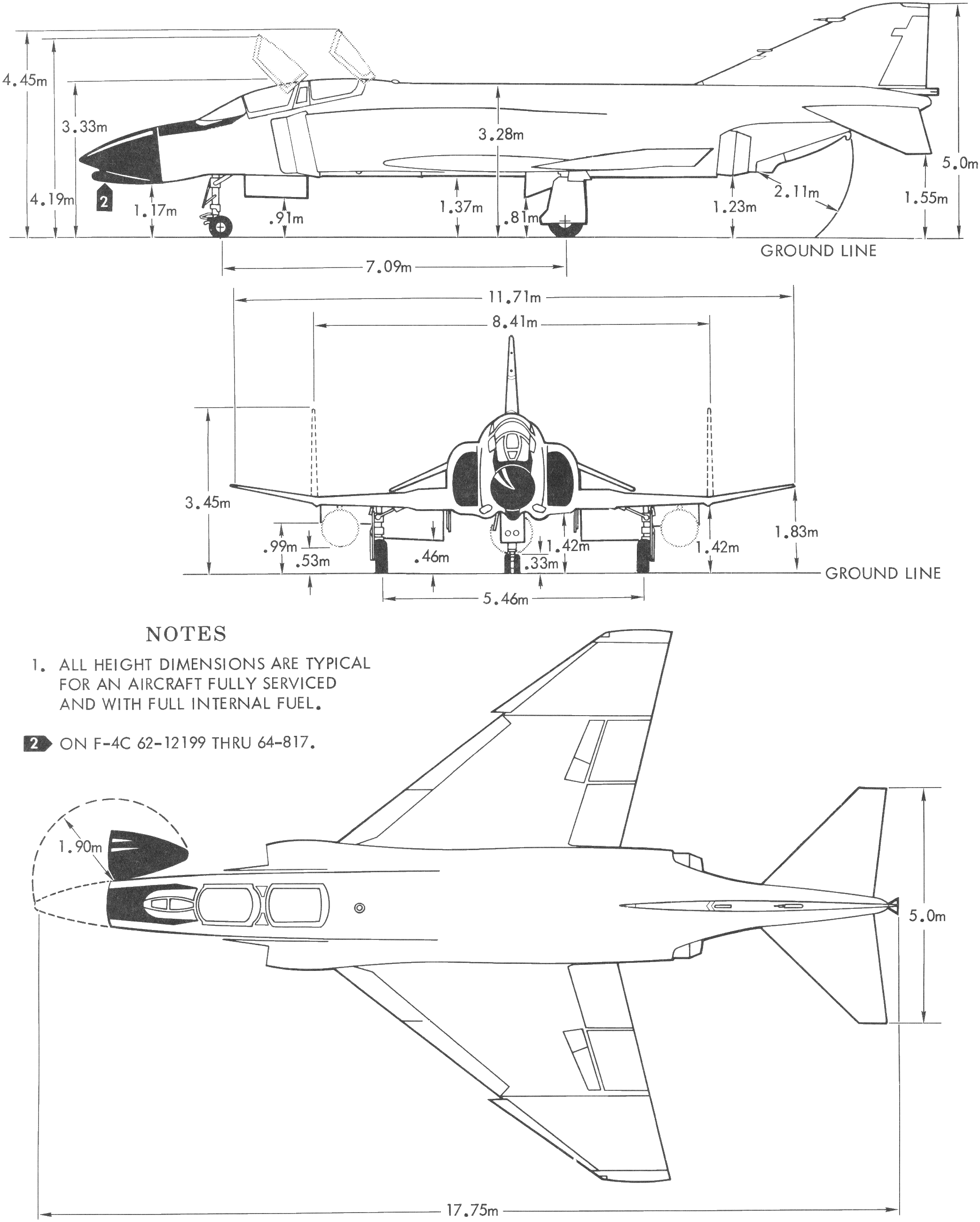
3-view line drawing of the McDonnell F-4C Phantom II

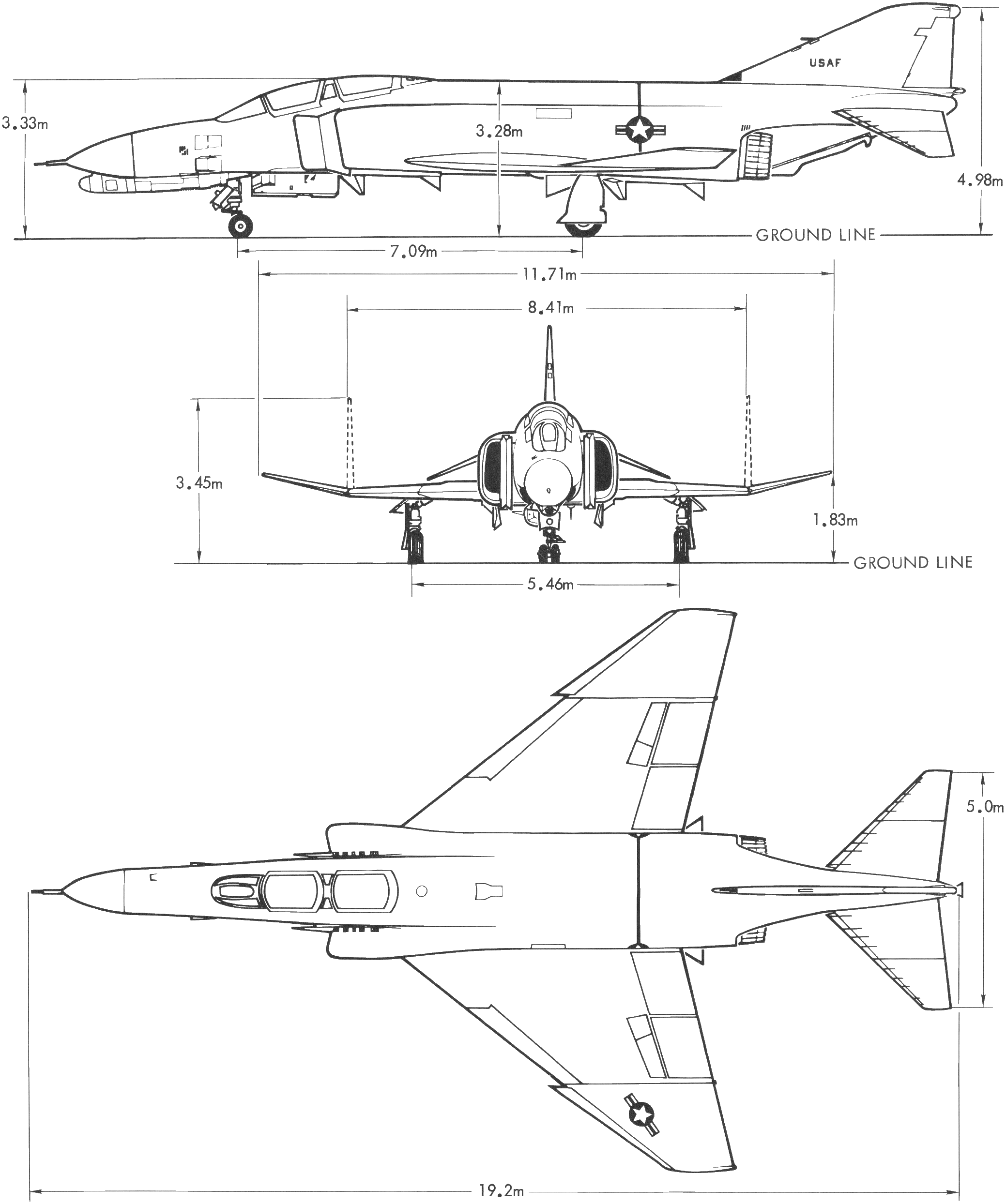
3-view line drawing of the McDonnell Douglas F-4E Phantom II

Data from The Great Book of Fighters, Quest for Performance, Encyclopedia of USAF Aircraft, and McDonnell F-4 Phantom: Spirit in the Skies

General characteristics

- Crew: 2
- Length: 63 ft 0 in (19.2 m)
- Wingspan: 38 ft 5 in (11.7 m)
- Width: 27 ft 7 in (8.4 m) wing folded
- Height: 16 ft 5 in (5 m)
- Wing area: 530 sq ft (49.2 m^{2})
- Aspect ratio: 2.77
- Airfoil: NACA 0006.4–64 root, NACA 0003-64 tip
- Empty weight: 30,328 lb (13,757 kg)
- Gross weight: 41,500 lb (18,824 kg)
- Max takeoff weight: 61,795 lb (28,030 kg)
- Maximum landing weight: 36,831 lb (16,706 kg)
- Fuel capacity: 1,994 US gal (1,660 imp gal; 7,550 L) or 12,961 lb (5,879 kg) internal, 3,335 US gal (2,777 imp gal; 12,620 L) or 21,678 lb (9,833 kg) with 2x 370 US gal (310 imp gal; 1,400 L) external tanks on the outer wing hardpoints and either a 600 or 610 US gal (500 or 510 imp gal; 2,300 or 2,300 L) tank for the center-line station.
- Powerplant: 2 × General Electric J79-GE-17A after-burning turbojet engines, 11,905 lbf (52.96 kN) thrust each dry, 17,845 lbf (79.38 kN) with afterburner

Performance

- Maximum speed: 1,280 kn (1,470 mph, 2,370 km/h) at 40,000 ft (12,000 m)
- Maximum speed: Mach 2.23
- Cruise speed: 510 kn (580 mph, 940 km/h)
- Combat range: 370 nmi (420 mi, 680 km)
- Ferry range: 1,457 nmi (1,677 mi, 2,699 km)
- Service ceiling: 60,000 ft (18,000 m)
- Rate of climb: 41,300 ft/min (210 m/s)
- Lift-to-drag: 8.58
- Wing loading: 78 lb/sq ft (380 kg/m^{2})
- Thrust/weight: 0.86 at loaded weight, 0.58 at MTOW
- Takeoff roll: 4,490 ft (1,370 m) at 53,814 lb (24,410 kg)
- Landing roll: 3,680 ft (1,120 m) at 36,831 lb (16,706 kg)

Armament

- E-model has a 20 mm (0.787 in) M61A1 Vulcan cannon mounted internally under the nose, 640 rounds
- Up to 18,650 lb (8,480 kg) of weapons on nine external hardpoints, including general-purpose bombs, cluster bombs, TV- and laser-guided bombs, rocket pods, air-to-ground missiles, anti-ship missiles, gun pods, and nuclear weapons. Reconnaissance, targeting, electronic countermeasures, baggage pods, and external fuel tanks may also be carried.
- 4× AIM-9 Sidewinders on wing pylons, Israeli F-4 Kurnass 2000 carried Python-3, Japanese F-4EJ Kai carry AAM-3.
- 4× AIM-7 Sparrow in fuselage recesses, upgraded Hellenic F-4E and German F-4F ICE carry AIM-120 AMRAAM, UK Phantoms carried Skyflash missiles
- 6× AGM-65 Maverick
- 4× AGM-62 Walleye
- 4× AGM-45 Shrike, AGM-88 HARM, AGM-78 Standard ARM
- 4× GBU-15, GBU-24
- 18× Mk.82, GBU-12
- 5× Mk.84, GBU-10
- 18× CBU-87, CBU-89, CBU-58
- 12x MK-20 Rockeye
- Nuclear weapons, including the B28EX, B61, B43 and B57

Avionics

- AN/APG-30 – fire-control radar
- AN/APG-76 – Multimode synthetic-aperture radar
- AN/APQ-117 – Terrain-following radar
- AN/ASQ-153 – Part of Pave Spike laser designator targeting pod
- AN/ASX-1 – Target Identification System Electro-Optical (TISEO)
- AN/AVQ-23 – Part of Pave Spike laser designator targeting pod

== See also ==
- F-4 Phantom II in fiction
- Operation Bolo

Related development

- McDonnell F3H Demon
- McDonnell Douglas Phantom FG.1/FGR.2/F.3

Aircraft of comparable role, configuration, and era

- Dassault Mirage III
- English Electric Lightning
- Mikoyan-Gurevich MiG-21
- Mikoyan-Gurevich MiG-23
- Republic F-105 Thunderchief
- Saab 35 Draken
- Shenyang J-8
- Sukhoi Su-15
- Vought XF8U-3 Crusader III

Related lists

- List of fighter aircraft
- List of military aircraft of the United States
- List of military electronics of the United States
