= Dassault Mirage =

French fighter aircraft family

Mirage is a name given to several types of jet aircraft designed by the French company Dassault Aviation (formerly Avions Marcel Dassault), some of which were produced in different variants. Most were supersonic fighters with delta wings. The most successful was the Mirage III in its many variants and derivatives, which were widely produced and modified both by Dassault and by other companies. Some variants were given other names, while some otherwise unrelated types were given the Mirage name.

== Early prototypes ==
- MD550 Mystère Delta, the original Dassault experimental delta jet, which provided the baseline for the main Mirage series. Two were built, later renamed Mirage I and II respectively:
  - Mirage I, the MD550-01 renamed.
  - Mirage II, the MD550-02 renamed.

== Mirage III/5/50 series ==
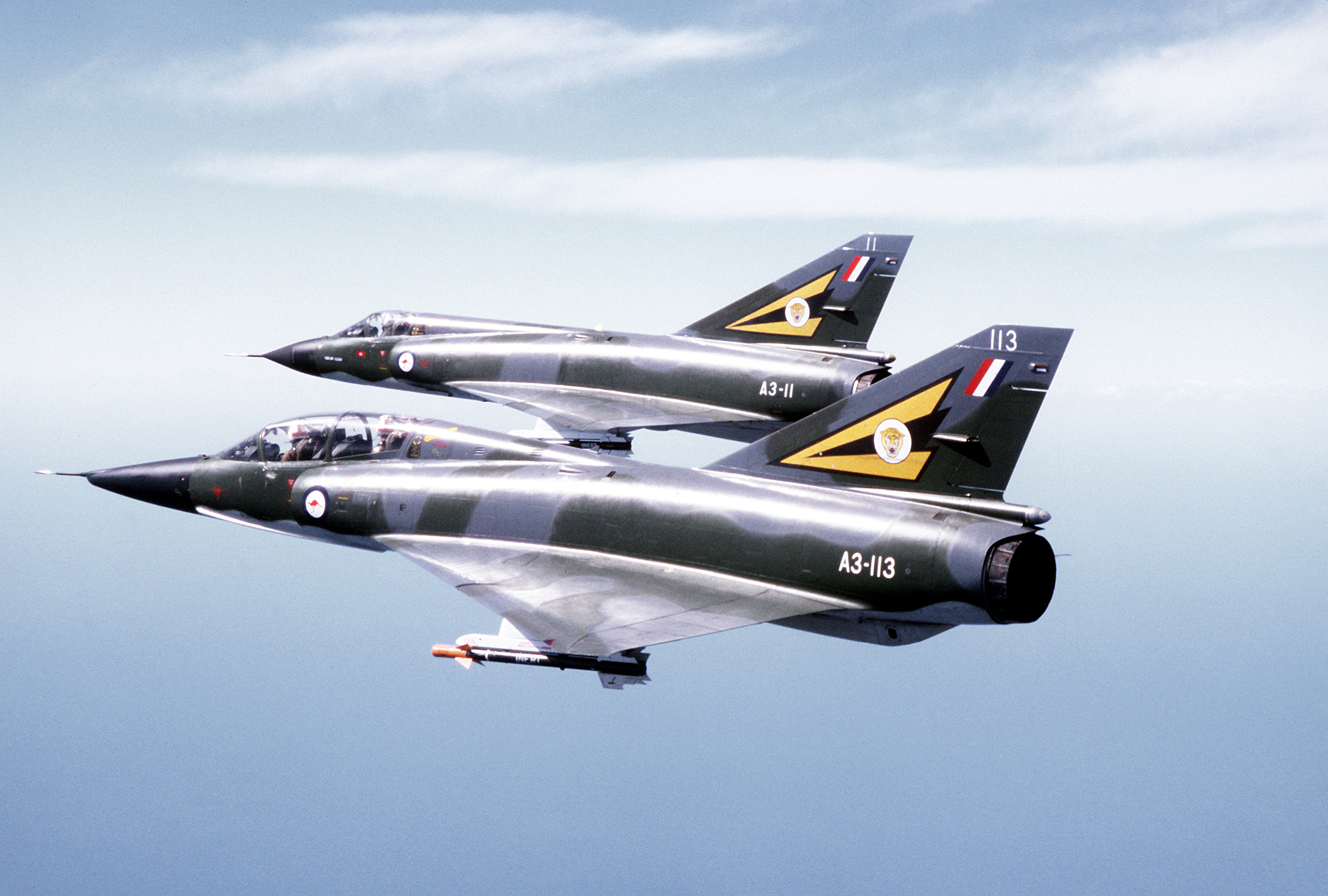
Two Mirage III fighters in RAAF colours

The most successful line of Mirages were a family of supersonic delta-winged fighters, all sharing the same basic airframe but differing in powerplant, equipment and minor details. Early examples were tailless, while many later variants had canard foreplanes added.

=== France ===
The main production variants include:

- Mirage III, definitive production type which established the series.
- Mirage 5, developed from the Mirage III.
- Mirage 50, developed from the Mirage 5.

Minor projects and prototypes include:

- Balzac, Mirage IIIT and Mirage IIIV: Prototypes researching supersonic VTOL design. The Balzac and Mirage IIIV both had VTOL capability.
- Milan: a Mirage III example, modified with retractable foreplanes or "moustaches".
- Mirage IIING, developed from the Mirage 50 and featuring fixed canard foreplanes similar to the preceding Milan (see above). Like the Milan, only one airframe was converted.

=== Israel ===
Israel produced several progressive developments of the Mirage 5:

- IAI Nesher, a standard Mirage 5 with revised avionics.
- IAI Kfir, re-engined with further revised avionics and canard foreplane.
- IAI Nammer, again re-engined with further revised avionics and canard foreplane. Prototype only.

=== Pakistan ===
Pakistan acquired a number of used Mirage IIIs and 5s, manufactured variously in France and Australia.

- Project ROSE upgraded the fleet with new avionics.

=== South Africa ===
South Africa upgraded its fleet of Mirage IIIs to meet local requirements:

- Atlas Cheetah, a Mirage III upgrade based on the IAI Kfir.

=== Chile ===
Chile upgraded its fleet of Mirage 50s to meet local requirements:

- ENAER Pantera (Mirage 50CN and 50DC), a Mirage 50 upgrade based on the IAI Kfir.

== Other Mirage types ==
=== Production models ===
- Mirage IV: Delta-winged tailless supersonic nuclear bomber. Largest of all the Mirages.
- Mirage F1 and MF2000: Conventional-configuration supersonic fighter.
- Mirage 2000 supersonic tailless delta-winged successor to the Mirage 50, with an all-new airframe.

=== Prototypes ===
- Mirage F2: Strike fighter, a larger and more powerful version of the conventionally tailed F1.
- Mirage G, G4 and G8: Variable-geometry (swing-wing) fighters. The G was effectively a swing-wing F2, while the G4 and G8 were twin-engined developments.
- Mirage 4000 or Super Mirage 4000: Prototype larger version of the Mirage 2000 design.

=== Project studies ===
- Mirage 6000: the MD.750 Mach 3 capable fighter, developed under the Système Avion Mach Élevé (High Mach Aircraft System) SAME project.
