= Dassault Mirage G =

French prototype fighter jet

Mirage G
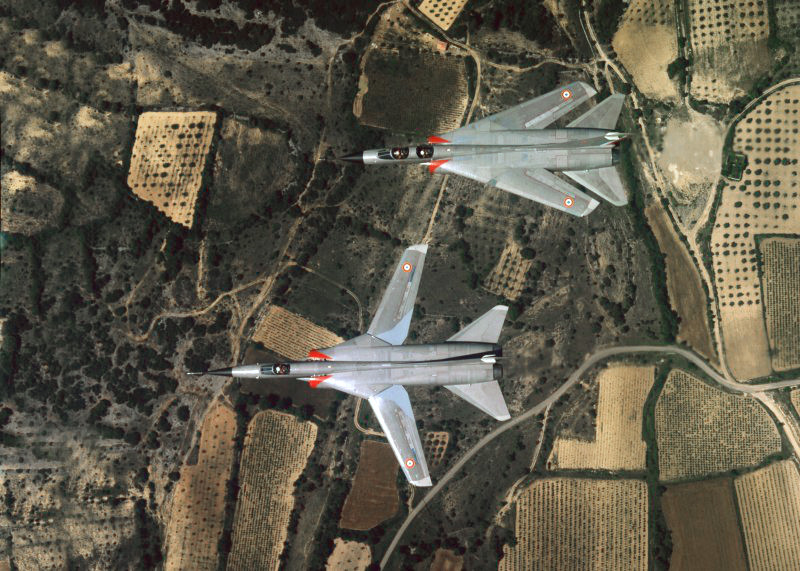
- The Dassault Mirage G8-01 and G8-02 prototypes in flight. The G8-01's wings are swept.

General information
- Type: Swing-wing multirole fighter
- Manufacturer: Dassault Aviation
- Status: Cancelled in the 1970s
- Primary user: French Air Force
- Number built: 3

History
- First flight: 18 November 1967
- Retired: 1970s by France
- Developed from: Dassault Mirage F2

The Dassault Mirage G, also known as the Mirage IIIG, is a variant of the French Dassault Mirage series of supersonic warplanes, but with a variable-sweep wing. Three prototypes were flown; one single-engined G and two twin-engined G8 examples (which had begun construction as the G4). Various roles, equipment fits and other variants were proposed, but none entered production.

== History ==
=== Origins ===
In 1963 the French defence ministry initiated studies on variable-sweep wing aircraft for dual land and aircraft carrier use in response to the American TFX program (which would lead to the General Dynamics F-111).

Alongside the theoretical research undertaken by ONERA, Avions Marcel Dassault began studies of a Mirage variant. An early study was the Mirage F4G. In 1964 they proposed the model MD800 for a carrier-based two-seat, twin-engined Naval version to meet the DAFNE requirement. Alongside it they also proposed a smaller single-engined Mirage IIIF2G.

The UK was also studying the concept and in 1965 Dassault and the British Aircraft Corporation (BAC) were jointly contracted to develop an Anglo-French Variable Geometry (AFVG) aircraft. This was to be of the heavier two-seat, twin-engined size. The partnership fell apart when Dassault withdrew over political wrangling in 1967.

Meanwhile the IIIF2G initiative had led to an order for the first Mirage G prototype, to be of single-seat, single-engined configuration. Its rollout in 1967, at much the same time as the larger AFVG was cancelled, led to accusations by the British that Dassault had been undermining them all along.

=== Mirage G ===
The first variable-sweep aircraft from Dassault emerged as the single-engined, two-seat Mirage G fighter in 1967, essentially a swing wing version of the Mirage F2. The wings were swept at 22 degrees when fully forward and 70 degrees when fully aft and featured full-span double-slotted trailing edge flaps and two-position leading edge flaps.

The first flight was 18 November 1967. The plane was generally well received, however it crashed on 13 January 1971, following total loss of electrical power.

=== Mirage G8 ===
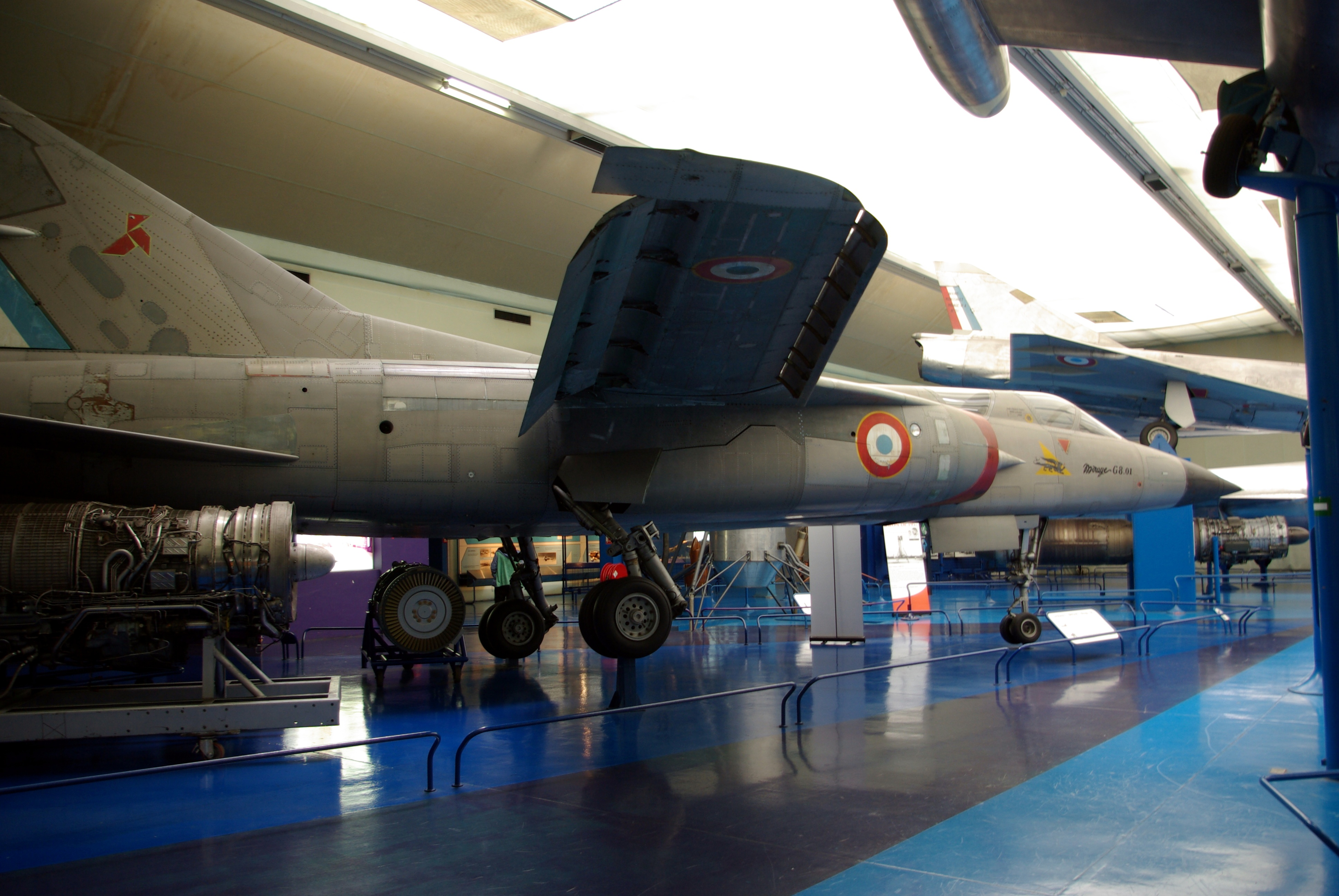
G8-01 is on public display at the Musée de l'Air et de l'Espace

By this time the Mirage G4 had been proposed as a twin-engine, two-seat nuclear strike fighter. A contract was issued in 1968 for two new prototypes, G4-01 and -02. These were intended to be powered by Snecma M53 turbofans in production. However while they were under construction the requirements changed to a dedicated interceptor and the design was modified accordingly. They were completed in this form, now redesignated the Mirage G8.

Mirage G8-01 first flew on 8 May 1971. The second aircraft, G8-02, was finished as a single-seater, with the rear cockpit space adapted to take avionics and faired over. It also had a longer and slimmer nose fitted with a mockup of a Cyrano radar radome. It followed -01 into the air on 13 July 1972.

The G8 was equipped with Thomson-CSF radar and a low-altitude navigational-attack system based on that used in the SEPECAT Jaguar and Dassault Milan. As no funding was included for the Mirage G8 in the 1971-1976 French defence budget the aircraft did not enter production.

Flight trials were relatively successful but no production order ensued, the Mirage G programme being cancelled in 1968. Flying with the Mirage G continued however until 13 January 1971 when the sole prototype was lost in an accident.

=== Influence on the LTV V-507 ===
In the late 1960s, the US manufacturer Ling-Temco-Vought (LTV) was seeking technical data on variable-geometry wings, within the framework of a bid for the US Navy's VFX carrier fighter contract. As a result of the publicity gained by the Mirage G, LTV sought the assistance of Dassault. Two agreements were signed by Dassault and LTV in 1968: one for general cooperation and the other specifically in regard to variable-geometry wings. Eight Dassault engineers went to America to help with the design. This resulted in two LTV designs, the Vought V-505 and V-507, as well as construction of a full-scale, non-flying mockup of the second design. In the event, the competition was won by another variable-geometry design, the Grumman F-14 Tomcat.

One outcome of the visit was a twin-engined two-seat Mirage G5 study. This was effectively an enlarged and navalised G4/G8, to be powered by twin SNECMA-built Pratt & Whitney TF306 turbofans. Length was 19.80 metres (65 ft 0 in), and span 17.8 metres (58 ft 5 in).

== Variants ==
Note: Source is Carbonel 2023, unless otherwise stated.

F4G
Initial study prior to the start of the first prototype. 1963-4.
MD800
DAFNE submission, 1964.
G
Single-engined initial prototype. One flown from 1967.
G0
Advanced trainer/attack variant offered to Australia, in single- and twin-engined versions. Reached mock-up stage.
G1 and G1M
Productionised G offered to the French and Australian air forces in 1968; the G1M was a Naval variant, subsequently proposed in 1970.
G2 and G6
Proposed NATO replacement for the Lockheed F-104G Starfighter, initially developed in parallel with the G1.
G3 and G3M
Longer-range development of the G3 with improved radar. The navalised version, the G3M, was deemed too large and heavy for carrier operation.
G4 and G8
Twin-engine fighter project. Two G4 nuclear strike fighter prototypes begun but redesignated the G8 interceptor during construction. Flew respectively as two- and single-seaters from 1968.
G5
Study around the LTV V-507 requirement. Enlarged, navalised G4.
G8A or Super Mirage
A fixed-wing, 55 deg sweepback development of the G8. 1973 contract for a prototype cancelled in 1975.

== Aircraft on display ==
- Mirage G8-01 is on display at the Musée de l’air et de l’espace alongside Paris–Le Bourget Airport.
- Mirage G8-02 is on display at the Musée Européen de l'Aviation de Chasse, Montélimar.

== Specifications (Mirage G8-02) ==
General characteristics

- Crew: 1
- Length: 18.8 m (61 ft 8 in)
- Wingspan: 15.4 m (50 ft 6 in)
- Swept wingspan: 8.7 m (28 ft 7 in) swept
- Height: 5.35 m (17 ft 7 in)
- Empty weight: 14,740 kg (32,496 lb)
- Max takeoff weight: 23,800 kg (52,470 lb)
- Powerplant: 2 × SNECMA Atar 9K50 afterburning turbojet engines, 49.03 kN (11,020 lbf) thrust each dry, 70.1 kN (15,800 lbf) with afterburner

Performance

- Maximum speed: Mach 2.2 (2,336 km/h)
- Range: 3,850 km (2,390 mi, 2,080 nmi)
- Service ceiling: 18,500 m (60,700 ft)

== See also ==
Related development

- Dassault Mirage series
- Dassault Mirage F2

Aircraft of comparable role, configuration, and era

- General Dynamics F-111 Aardvark
- Grumman F-14 Tomcat
- Mikoyan-Gurevich MiG-23
- Panavia Tornado

Related lists

- List of fighter aircraft
- List of military aircraft of France
