= Pratt & Whitney TF30 =

American low-bypass turbofan

TF30
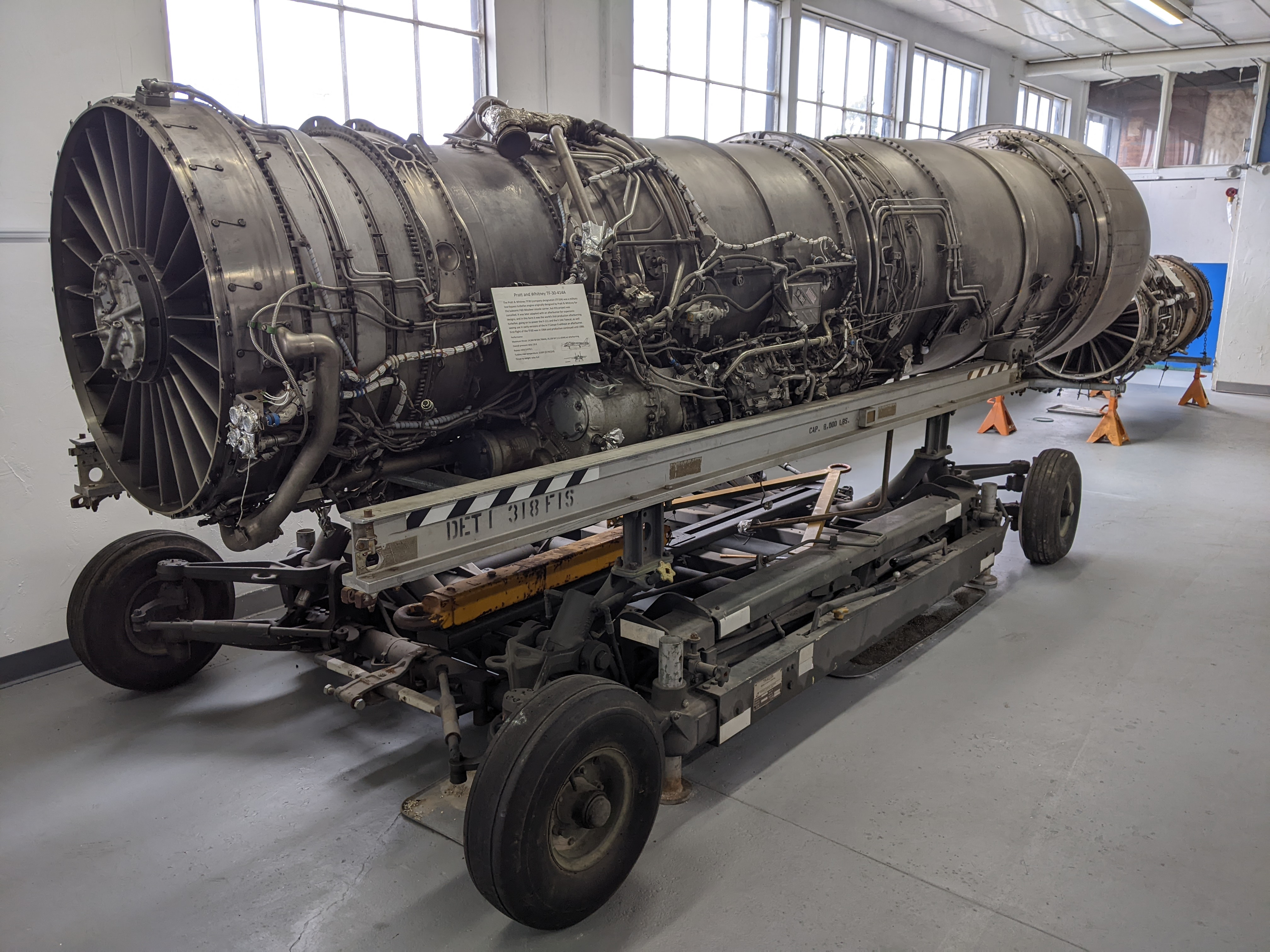
- A TF30 in the Oakland Aviation Museum
- Type: Turbofan
- National origin: United States
- Manufacturer: Pratt & Whitney
- First run: 1960s
- Major applications: General Dynamics F-111 Aardvark; Grumman F-14 Tomcat; LTV A-7 Corsair II

The Pratt & Whitney TF30 (company designation JTF10A) is a military low-bypass turbofan engine originally designed by Pratt & Whitney for the subsonic F6D Missileer fleet defense fighter, but this project was cancelled. It was later adapted with an afterburner for supersonic designs, and in this form it was the world's first production afterburning turbofan, going on to power the F-111 and the F-14A Tomcat, as well as being used in early versions of the A-7 Corsair II without an afterburner. First flight of the TF30 was in 1964 and production continued until 1986.

== Design and development ==
In 1958, the Douglas Aircraft Company proposed a short-range, four-engined jet airliner to fill the gap below its new DC-8 intercontinental, known internally as the Model 2067. Intended to be marketed as DC-9, it was not directly related to the later twin-engined Douglas DC-9. Pratt & Whitney (P&W) had offered its JT8A turbojet for the airliner, but Douglas preferred to go with a turbofan engine, which would have a greater fuel efficiency than a turbojet. P&W then proposed the JT10A, a half-scale version of its newly developed JT8D turbofan. Development of the new design began in April 1959, using the core of the JT8. Douglas shelved the model 2067 design in 1960, as the targeted US airlines preferred the newly offered Boeing 727.

In 1960, the United States Navy selected the JT10A, designated TF30-P-1, to power the proposed Douglas F6D Missileer, but the project was cancelled in April 1961. Meanwhile, the TF30 had been chosen by General Dynamics for its entrant in the TFX competition for the United States Air Force and USN, which was selected for production as the F-111. The version of the TF30 for the F-111 included an afterburner.

== Operational history ==
=== F-111 ===
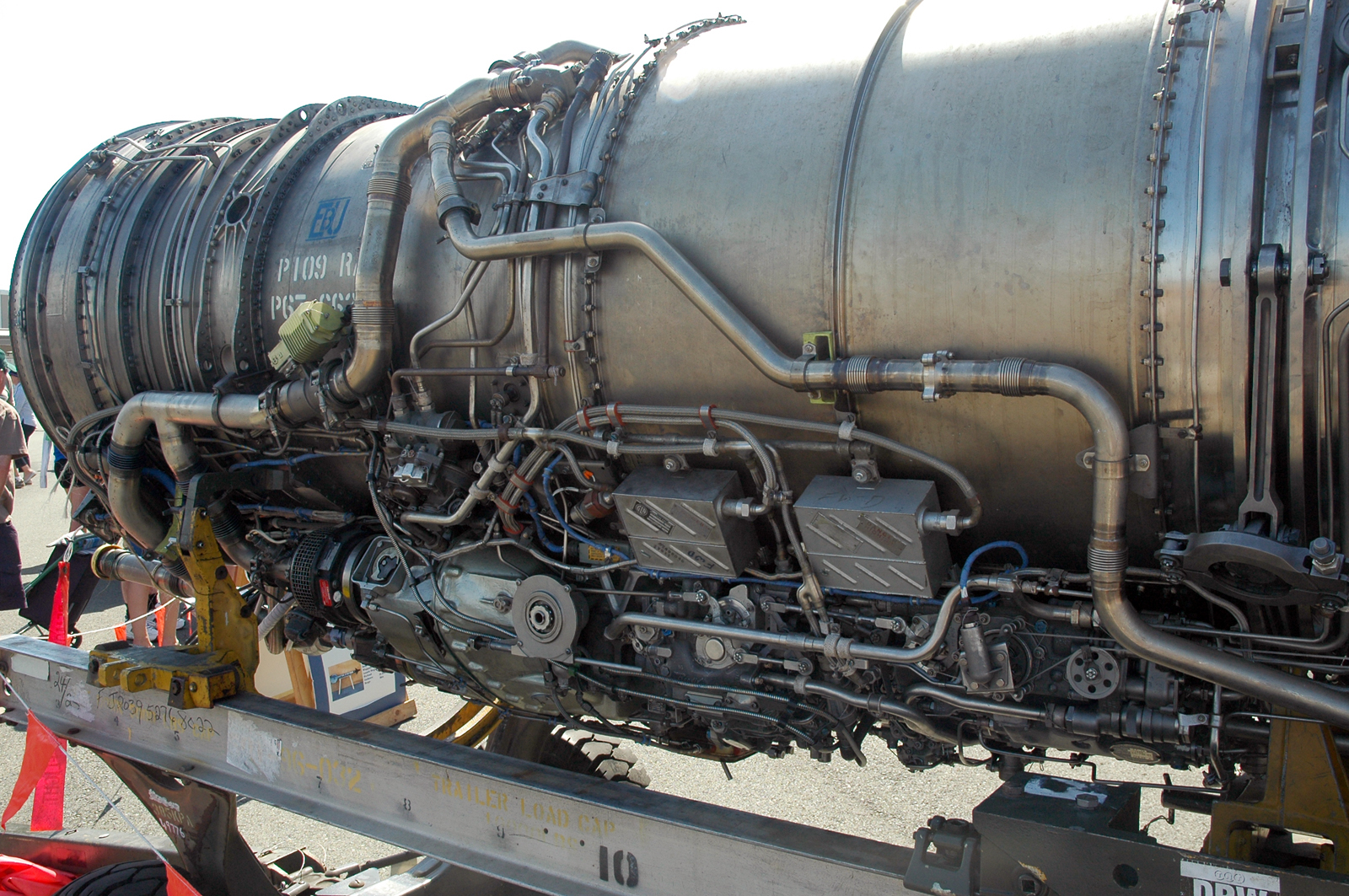
A TF30-P-109 from an RAAF F-111 at Defence Force Air Show RAAF Amberley, October 2008

The F-111A, EF-111A and F-111E used the TF30-P-3 turbofan. The F-111 had problems with inlet compatibility, and many faulted the placement of the intakes behind the disturbed air of the wing. Newer F-111 variants incorporated improved intake designs and most variants featured more powerful versions of the TF30 engine. The F-111E was updated to use TF30-P-103 engines, the F-111D included the TF30-P-9/109, the FB-111A used the TF-30-P-7/107, and the F-111F had the TF30-P-100.

RAAF F-111Cs were upgraded with the unique P-108 version, using a P-109 engine mated to a P-107 afterburner. The F-111 Engine Business Unit (later taken over by TAE) at RAAF Base Amberley became the world experts on the TF-30 in the years after the USAF retired their fleet and achieved extraordinary increases in reliability of the TF-30.

The TF30 proved itself to be well-suited to the requirements of a high-speed low-altitude strike aircraft with a relatively long operational range, and F-111s in all guises would continue to use TF30s until their retirement.

=== A-7 ===
In 1964, the subsonic LTV A-7A Corsair II won the US Navy's VAL competition for a light attack aircraft to replace the Douglas A-4 Skyhawk. The A-7A used a non-afterburning variant of the TF30, which would also power the improved A-7B and A-7C. In 1965, the USAF selected the A-7D as a replacement for its fast-jet F-100 and F-105 supersonic fighter-bombers in the close air support role. Though the USAF had wanted the TF30, Pratt & Whitney was unable to meet the production timetable, because its facilities were already committed to producing other engines. Instead of producing the TF30 under license for P&W, the Allison Engine Company offered to the Air Force its TF41 turbofan, a license-built version of the RB.168-25R Spey. The USAF selected the more powerful TF41 for the A-7D, as did the USN, for its similar A-7E.

=== F-14 ===
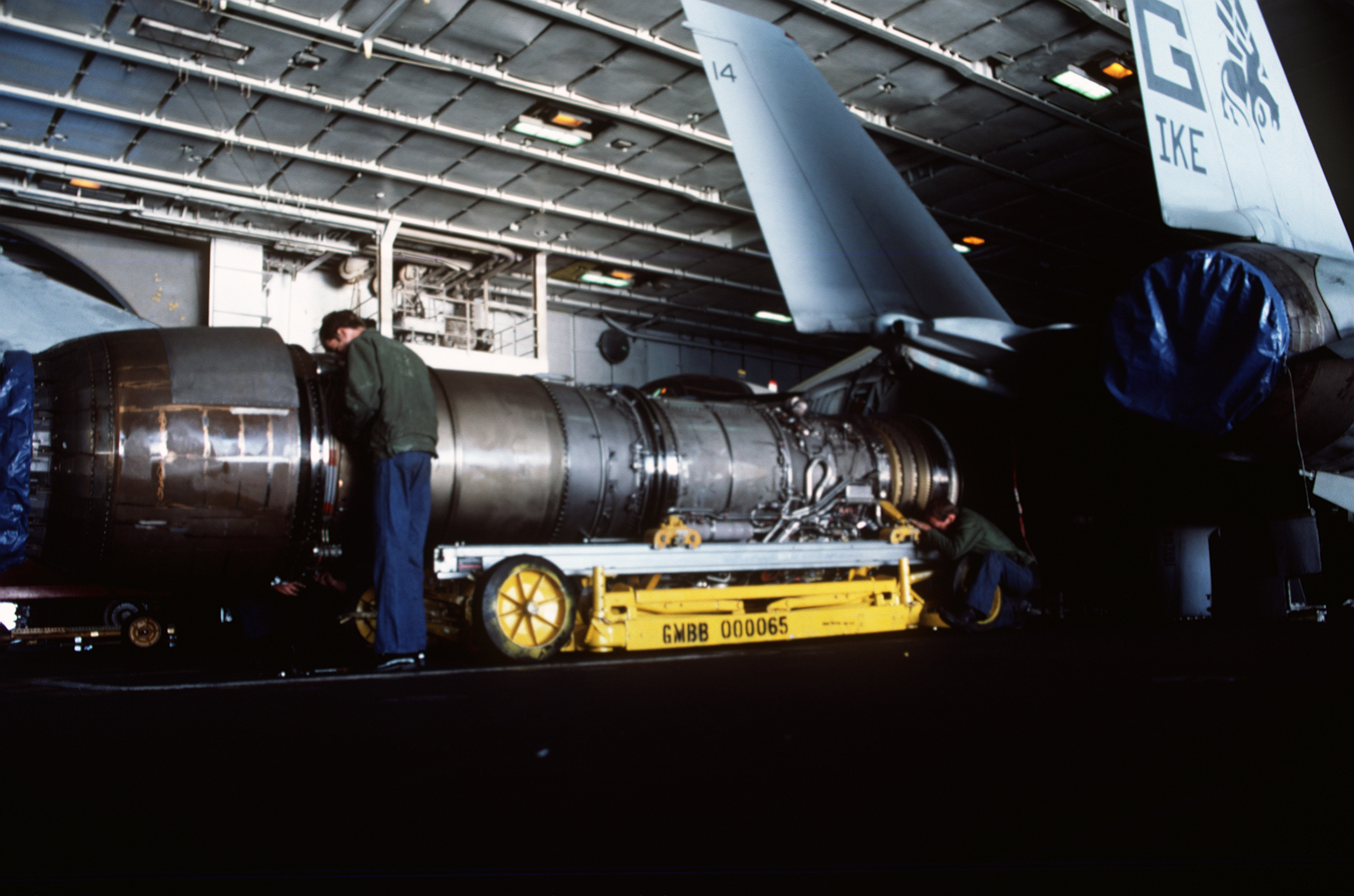
A TF30-P-412A being prepared for installation in an F-14A Tomcat on board a carrier

The Grumman F-14 Tomcat with the TF30-P-414A was underpowered, because it was the Navy's intent to procure a jet fighter with a thrust-to-weight ratio (in clean configuration) of 1 or better (the US Air Force had the same goals for the F-15 Eagle and F-16 Fighting Falcon). However, due to reliability issues with the intended Pratt & Whitney F401 engines and the intent to incorporate as many of the systems of the failed Navy version of the F-111, the F-111B, into the project, it was deemed that the initial production run of F-14s utilize the F-111B's powerplant. The F-14A's thrust-to-weight ratio was similar to the F-4 Phantom II; however, the new fuselage and wing design provided greater lift and a better climb profile than the F-4. The TF30 was found to be ill-adapted to the demands of air combat and was prone to compressor stalls at high angle of attack (AOA), if the pilot moved the throttles aggressively. Because of the Tomcat's widely spaced engine nacelles, compressor stalls at high AOA were especially dangerous because they tended to produce asymmetric thrust that could send the Tomcat into an upright or inverted spin, from which recovery was very difficult.

The TF30's problems in F-14's did not occur in the USAF and RAAF F-111s to the same extent. While the F-111 was technically designated a "fighter," it was actually used as a ground attack aircraft and tactical bomber. A typical ground strike mission is characterized by less abrupt changes in throttle, angle of attack and altitude than an air-to-air combat mission. While it can still involve hard and violent maneuvers to avoid enemy missiles and aircraft, these maneuvers are generally still not nearly as hard and violent as those required in air-to-air combat, and the F-111 is a larger and less-maneuverable aircraft. Though the F-14A entered service with the Navy powered by the Pratt & Whitney TF30, by the end of the decade, following numerous problems with the original engine, the Department of Defense began procuring General Electric F110-GE-400 engines and installed them in the F-14A Plus (later redesignated to F-14B in 1991) that entered service with the fleet in 1988. These engines solved the reliability problems and provided nearly 30% more thrust, achieving a 1:1 dry thrust to weight ratio with a low fuel load. The subsequent F-14D, a combination of both remanufactured/upgraded F-14As and new manufacture F-14Ds, also used F110-GE-400 engines.

== Variants ==
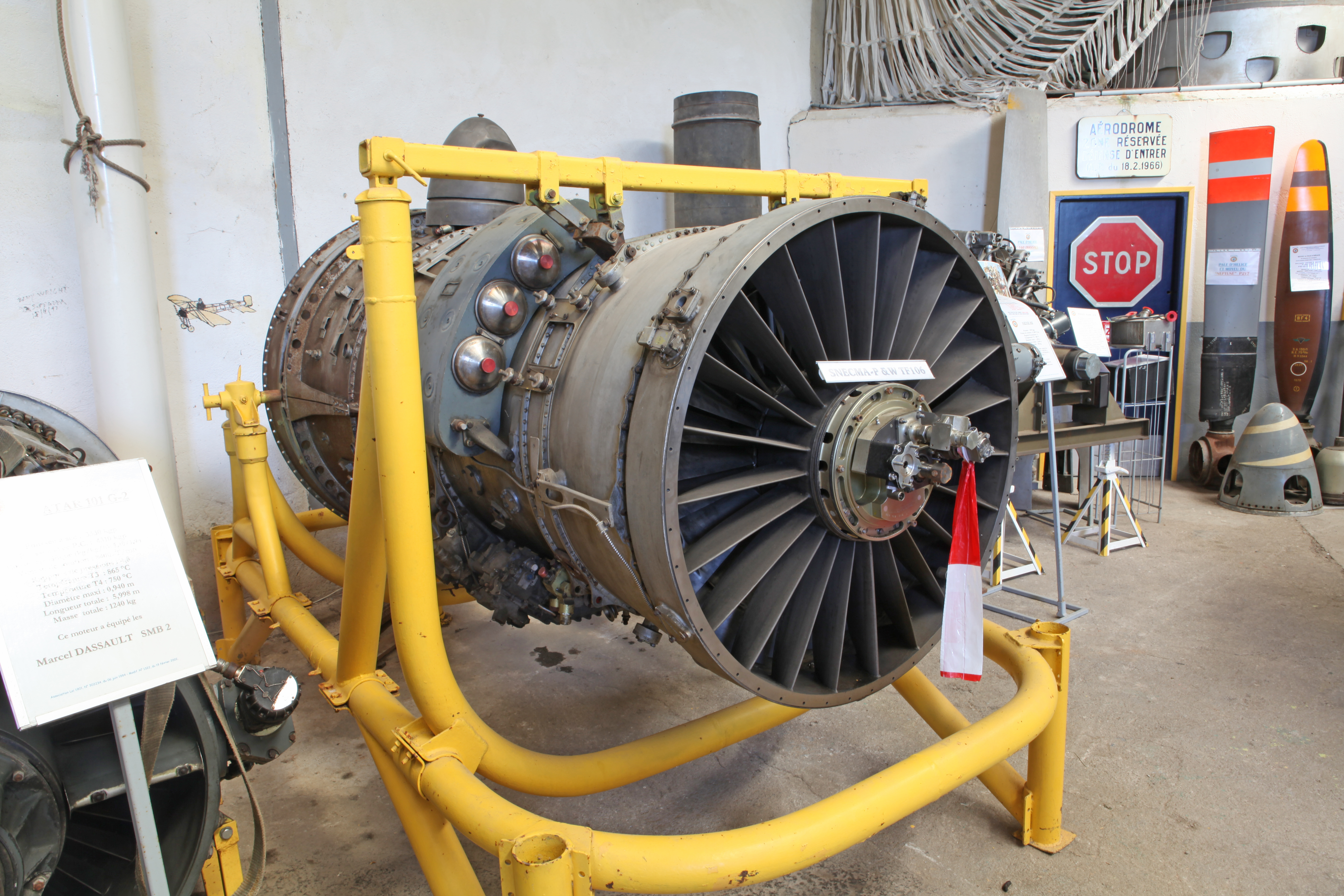
Pratt & Whitney/SNECMA TF106

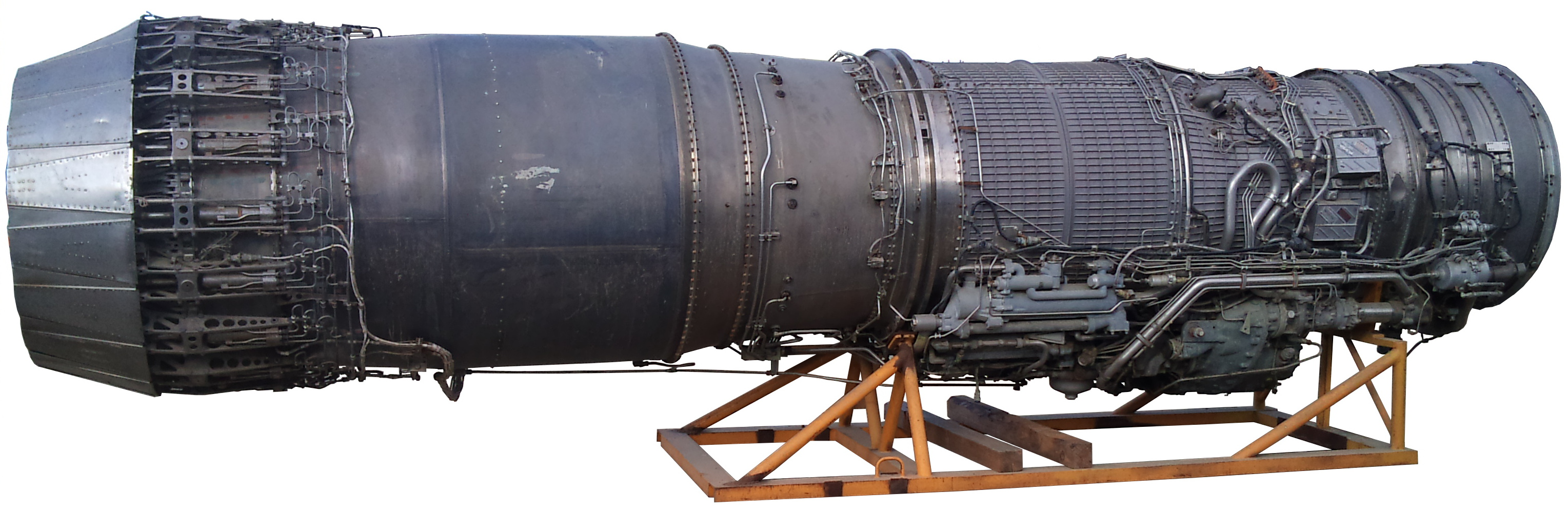
Pratt & Whitney/SNECMA TF306

Thrust given in foot-pounds (lbf) and kilonewtons (kN).

XTF30-P-1
8,250 lbf (36.70 kN)
YTF30-P-1
TF30-P-1
8,500 lbf (37.81 kN) / 18,500 lbf (82.29 kN) with afterburner.
TF30-P-1A
Similar to -1 with a fuel filter-heater instead of a fuel filter, initially powered first two prototype F-111B.
TF30-P-2
10,200 lbf (45.37 kN), intended to power the F6D Missileer.
TF30-P-3
8,500 lbf (37.81 kN) / 18,500 lbf (82.29 kN) with afterburner, powered the F-111A.
TF30-P-5
TF30-P-6
11,350 lbf (50.49 kN), powered the A-7A.
TF30-P-6A
TF30-P-6C
TF30-P-6E
TF30-P-7
12,350 lbf (54.94 kN) / 20,350 lbf (90.52 kN) with afterburner
TF30-P-8
12,200 lbf (54.27 kN), initially powered the A-7B/C.
TF30-P-9
12,000 lbf (53.38 kN) / 19,600 lbf (87.19 kN) with afterburner
TF30-P-12
10,750 lbf (47.82 kN) / 20,250 lbf (90.08 kN) with afterburner, powered the two pre-production F-111B.
TF30-P-12A
Similar to -12 with a fuel filter instead of a fuel filter-heater and deactivated wave-off feature, powered early production FB-111A.
TF30-P-14
TF30-P-16
TF30-P-18
YTF30-P-100
TF30-P-100
14,560 lbf (64.77 kN) / 25,100 lbf (111.65 kN) with afterburner, redesigned engine, powered the F-111F
TF30-P-103
9,800 lbf (43.59 kN) / 18,500 lbf (82.29 kN) with afterburner, redesignated -3 upgraded with -100 components under the Pacer 30 program
TF30-P-107
10,800 lbf (48.04 kN) / 20,350 lbf (90.52 kN) with afterburner, redesignated -7 upgraded with -100 components under the Pacer 30 program
TF30-P-108
Hybrid of -107 aft section and -109 fore section.
TF30-P-108RA
Redesignated -108 when in RAAF service, powered the F-111G.
TF30-P-109
20,840 lbf (92.70 kN) thrust with afterburner, redesignated -9 upgraded with -100 components under the Pacer 30 program
TF30-P-109RA
Redesignated -109 when in RAAF service, powered the F-111C.
TF30-P-408
13,390 lbf (59.56 kN), similar to -8, powered the A-7B/C.
TF30-P-412
Similar to -12
TF30-P-412A
10,800 lbf (48.04 kN) / 20,900 lbf (92.97 kN) with afterburner, similar to -12A, powered early production F-14A.
TF30-P-414A
Similar to -412A, powered later production F-14A.
JTF10A
Company designation for the TF30 family of engines
JTF10A-1
(XTF30-P-1) Intended to power the Douglas Model 2067.
JTF10A-6
Intended to power the Douglas Model 2086.
JTF10A-7
(TF30-P-2)
JTF10A-8
(TF30-P-6)
JTF10A-9
(TF30-P-8)
JTF10A-10
JTF10A-15
(TF30-P-18)
JTF10A-16
(TF30-P-408)
JTF10A-20
(TF30-P-1)
JTF10A-21
(TF30-P-3)
JTF10A-27A
(TF30-P-12)
JTF10A-27B
(TF30-P-12A)
JTF10A-27D
(TF30-P-7)
JTF10A-27F
(TF30-P-412)
JTF10A-32C
(TF30-P-100)
JTF10A-36
(TF30-P-9)
Pratt & Whitney/SNECMA TF104
Subsonic TF30 derivative modified by SNECMA, installed in Mirage IIIT and Mirage IIIV-01.
Pratt & Whitney/SNECMA TF106
A derivative of the TF30 to power the Dassault Mirage IIIV VTOL fighter.
Pratt & Whitney/SNECMA TF306C
A derivative of the TF30 tested in the Dassault Mirage F2.
Pratt & Whitney/SNECMA TF306E

== Gallery ==
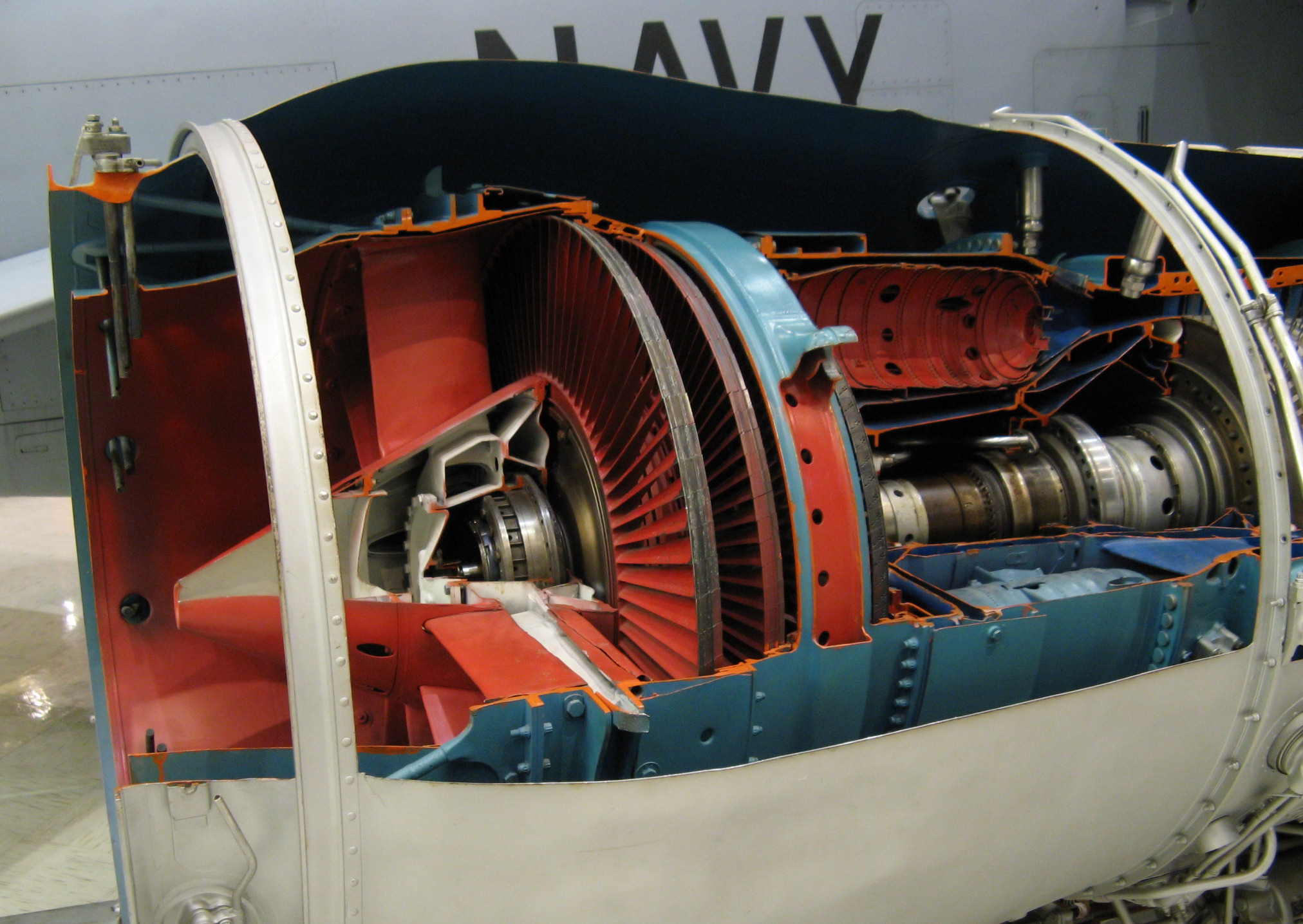
Combustion chamber and turbine.

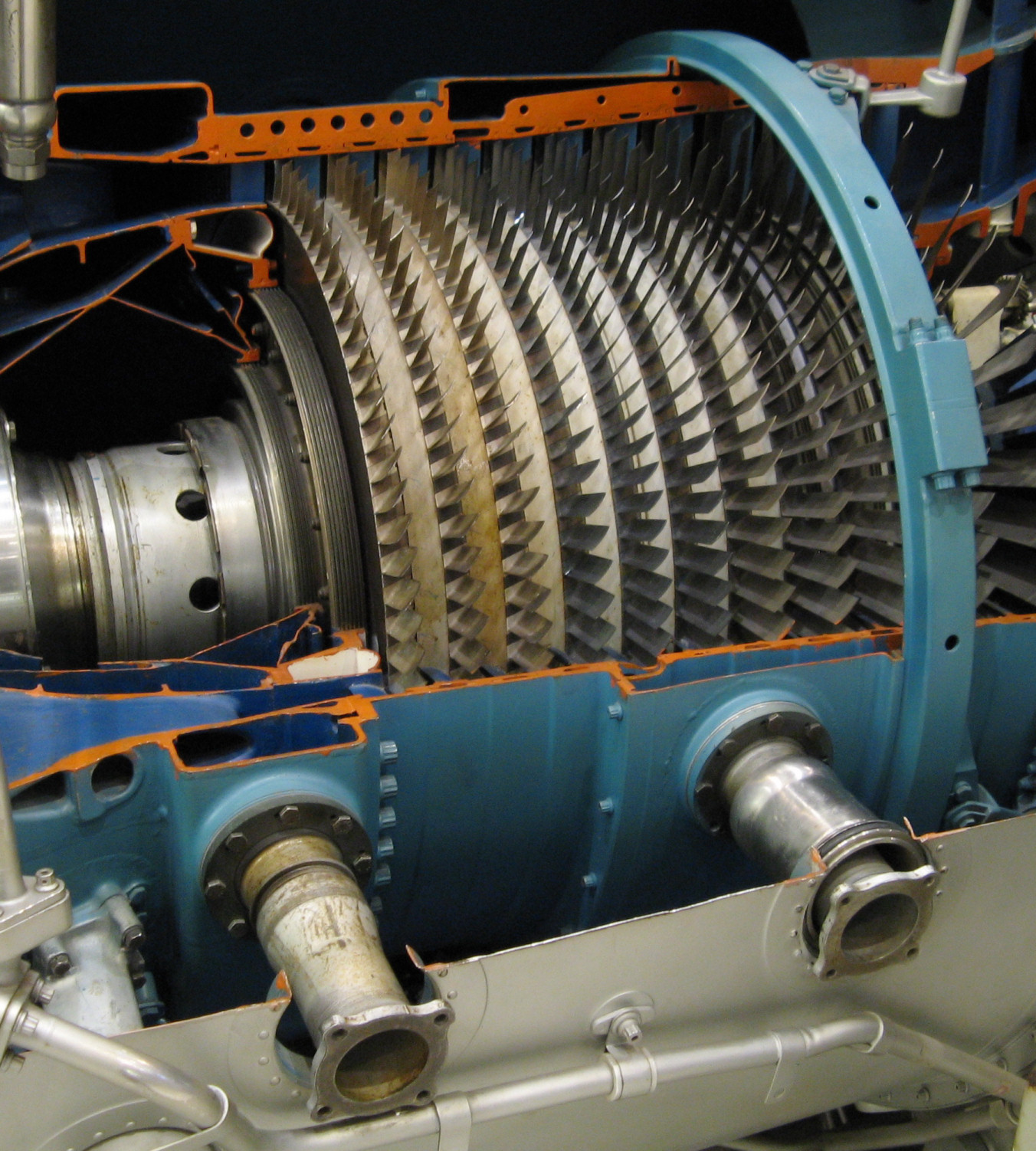
High pressure compressor.

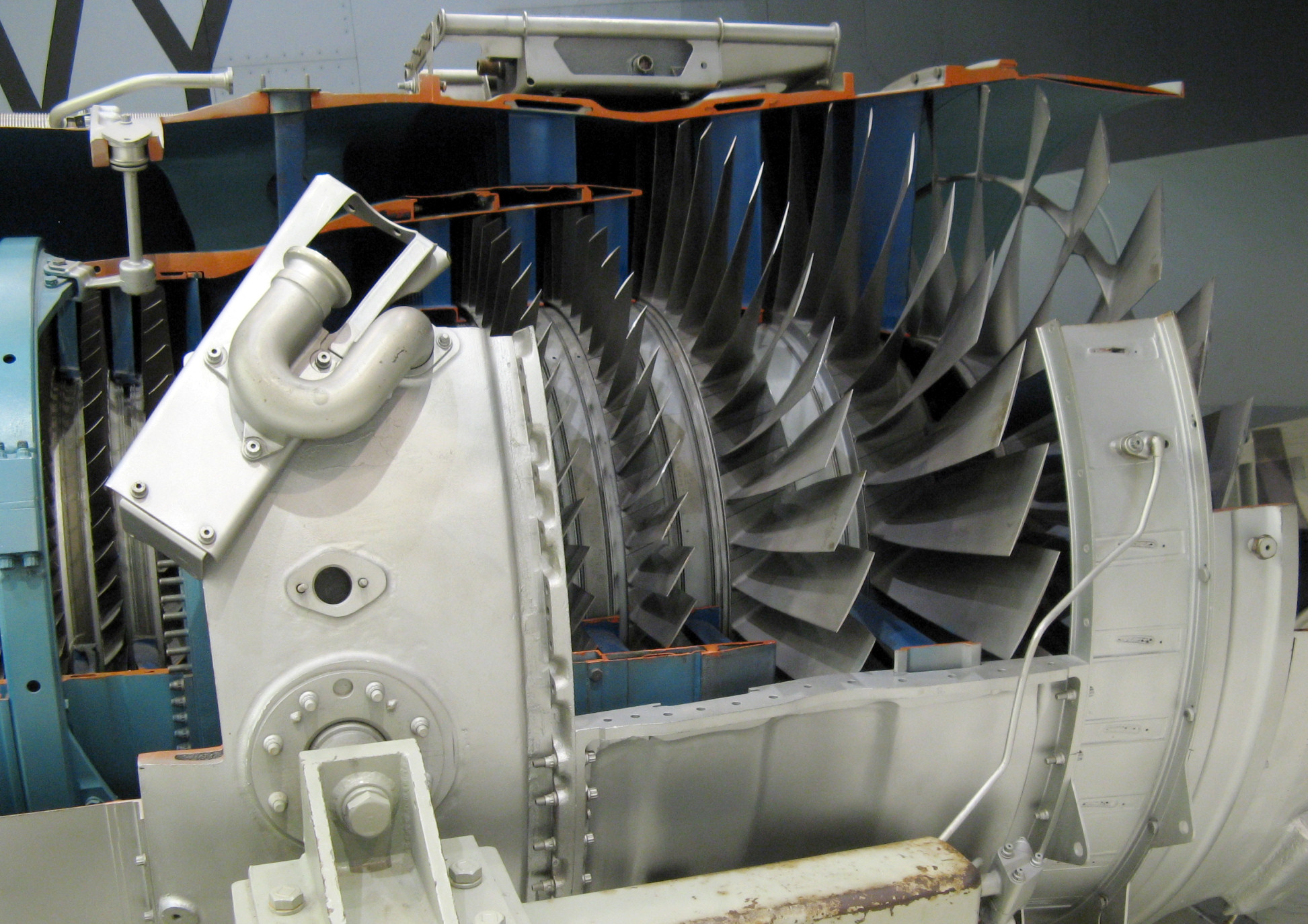
Compressor.

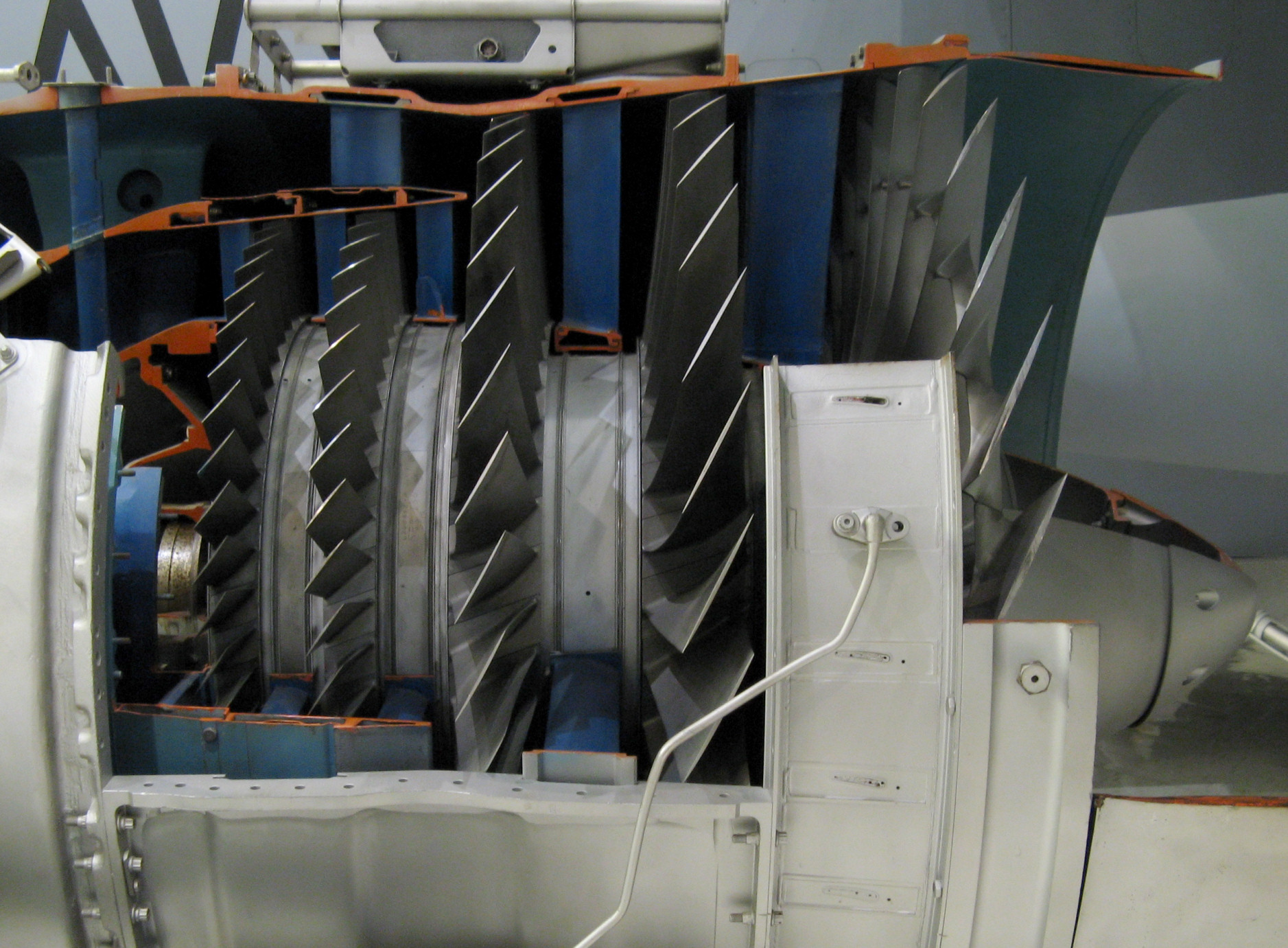
Low pressure compressor and fan.

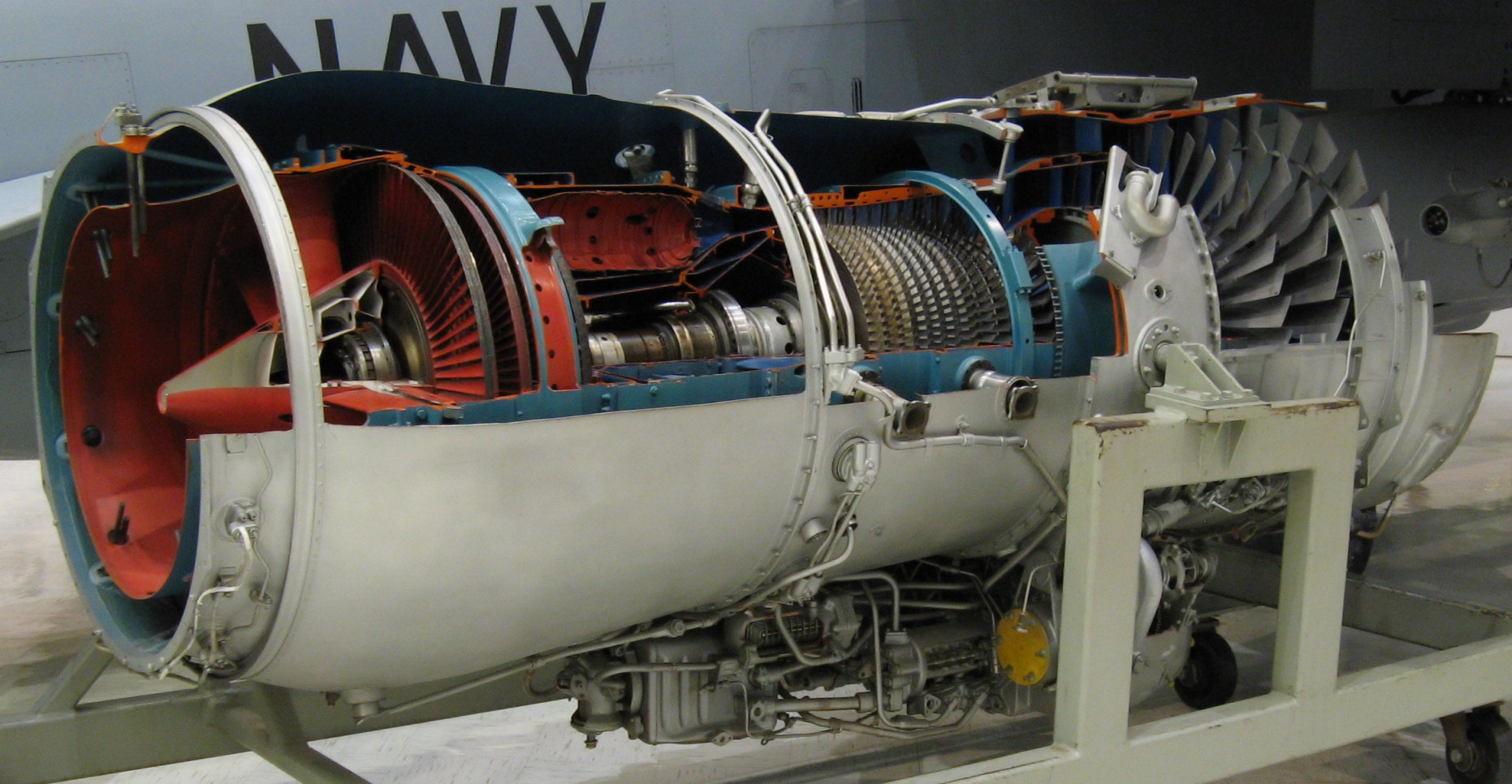
Cut out of a TF30-P-6

== Applications ==
TF30

- Douglas F6D Missileer (planned)
- General Dynamics F-111
- General Dynamics F-111C
- General Dynamics–Grumman EF-111A Raven
- General Dynamics–Grumman F-111B
- General Dynamics F-111K
- Grumman F-14A Tomcat
- LTV A-7A/B/C Corsair II

TF104/TF106

- Dassault Mirage IIIV

TF306

- Dassault Mirage F2
- Dassault Mirage G2

== Specifications ==
=== TF30-P-414 ===
Data from F-14 TF30-P-414 to F110-GE-400 Technical Comparison

==== General characteristics ====
- Type: Turbofan
- Length: 235.5 in (598.2 cm)
- Diameter: 51.4 in (130.6 cm) maximum
- Dry weight: 4,251 lb (1,928 kg)

==== Components ====
- Compressor: 2 spool axial: 3 fan and 6 low pressure stages, 7 high pressure stages
- Combustors: can-annular ("cannular")
- Turbine: 1 stage high pressure turbine, 3 stage low pressure turbine

==== Performance ====
- Maximum thrust: 10,800 lbf (48.0 kN) max continuous, 12,350 lbf (54.9 kN) intermediate (military), 20,900 lbf (93.0 kN) with afterburning
- Overall pressure ratio: 19.8
- Bypass ratio: 0.878:1
- Air mass flow: 242 lb/s (109.8 kg/s)
- Turbine inlet temperature: 2,150 °F (1,177 °C; 1,450 K)
- Thrust-to-weight ratio: 5.26

=== TF30-P-100 ===
Data from The Engines of Pratt & Whitney: A Technical History.

==== General characteristics ====
- Type: Turbofan
- Length: 241.7 in (613.9 cm)
- Diameter: 48.9 in (124.2 cm) maximum
- Dry weight: 3,985 lb (1,808 kg)

==== Components ====
- Compressor: 2 spool axial: 3 fan and 6 low pressure stages, 7 high pressure stages
- Combustors: can-annular ("cannular")
- Turbine: 1 stage high pressure turbine, 3 stage low pressure turbine

==== Performance ====
- Maximum thrust: 14,560 lbf (64.8 kN), 25,100 lbf (111.7 kN) with afterburning
- Air mass flow: 260 lb/s (117.9 kg/s)
- Thrust-to-weight ratio: 6.0

== See also ==
Comparable engines

- Allison TF41
- Klimov RD-33
- Rolls-Royce Spey
- Saturn AL-31
- Shenyang WS-10

Related lists

- List of aircraft engines
