= Dassault Aviation =

Aerospace manufacturer in France

Dassault Aviation SA

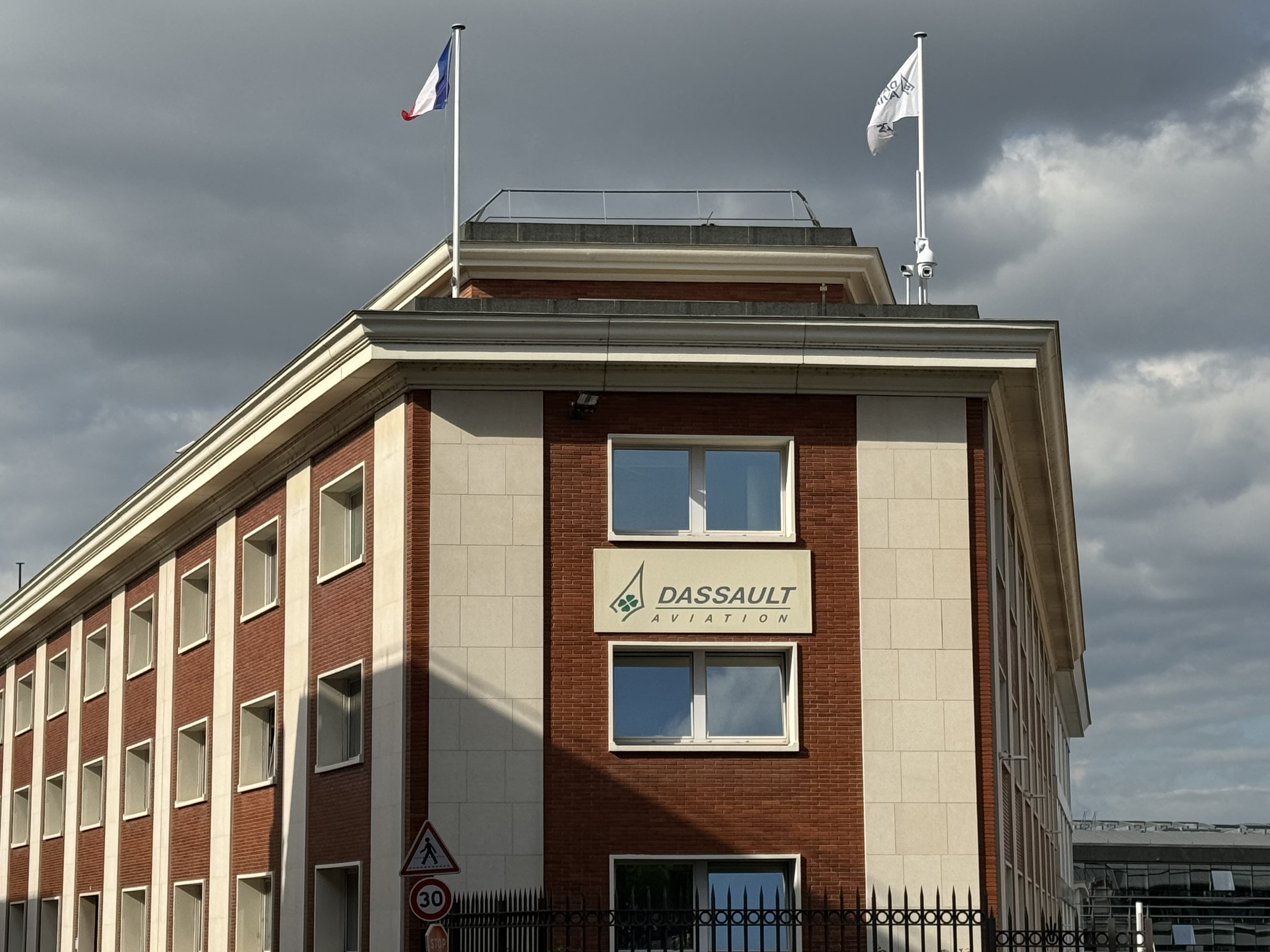
- Dassault Aviation headquarters in Saint-Cloud
- Type: Société Anonyme
- Traded as: Euronext Paris: AM; CAC Next 20
- ISIN: FR0014004L86
- Industry: Aerospace; Defense; Space industry
- Founded: 1929; 97 years ago
- Founder: Marcel Dassault
- Headquarters: Paris, France
- Key people: Éric Trappier (Chairman and CEO)
- Products: Civil aircraft Military aircraft Space activities
- Revenue: ▲€7.42 billion (2025)
- Operating income: ▲€635 million (2025)
- Net income: ▲€1.06 billion (2025)
- Total assets: ▲€32.9 billion (2025)
- Total equity: ▲€6.66 billion (2025)
- Number of employees: 14,600 (2024)
- Parent: Dassault Group
- Website: dassault-aviation.com

Dassault Aviation SA (French pronunciation: [da.so]) is a French manufacturer of military aircraft and business jets. It was founded in 1929 by Marcel Bloch as Société des Avions Marcel Bloch (Marcel Bloch Aircraft Company). After World War II, Marcel Bloch changed his name to Marcel Dassault, and the name of the company was changed to Avions Marcel Dassault on 20 January 1947.

In 1971, Dassault acquired Breguet, forming Avions Marcel Dassault-Breguet Aviation (AMD-BA). In 1990, the company was renamed Dassault Aviation, and is a subsidiary of the Dassault Group.

Dassault Aviation has been headed by Éric Trappier since 9 January 2013.

== History ==
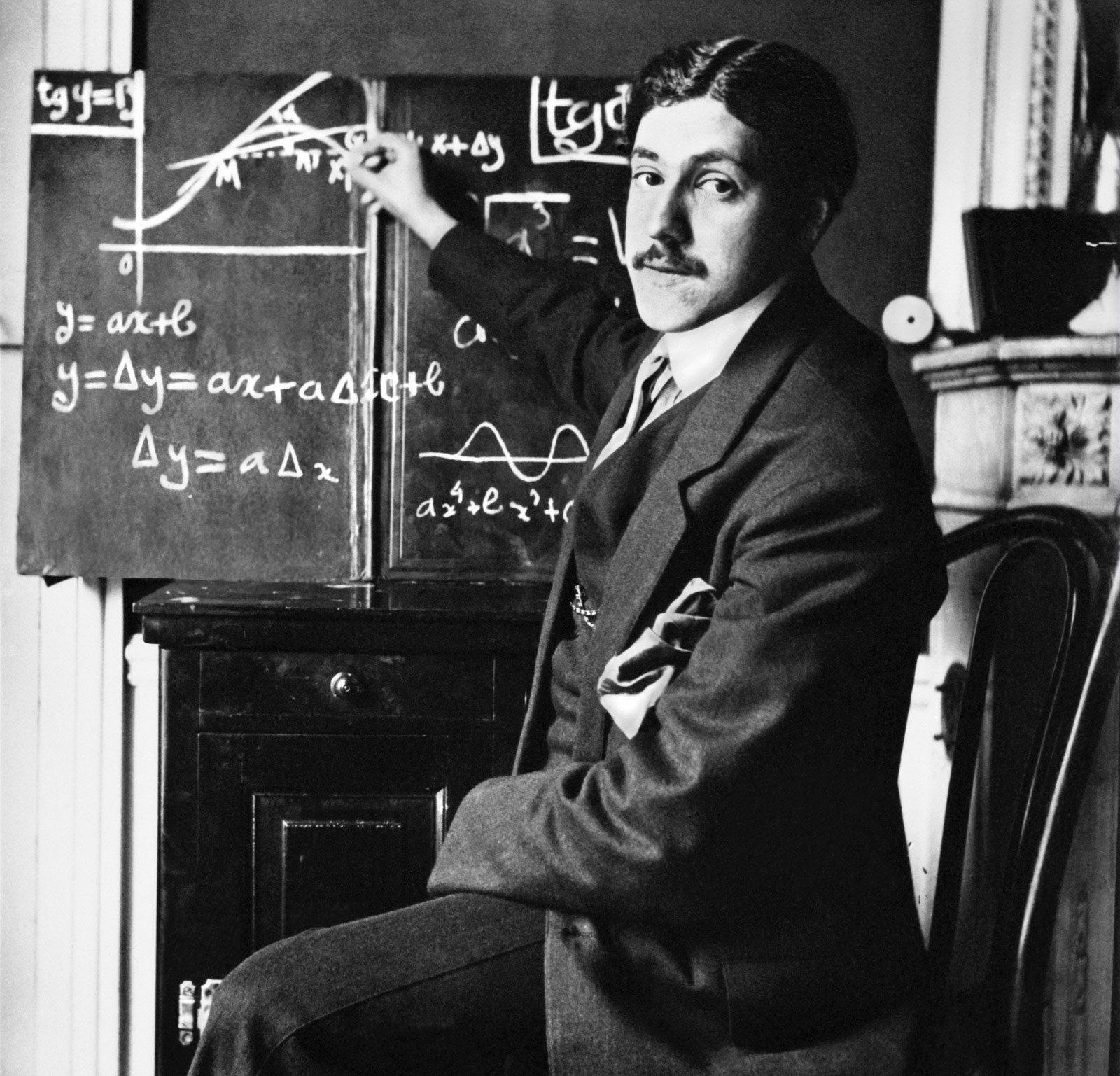
Marcel Bloch – around 1914

The Société des Avions Marcel Bloch was founded by Marcel Bloch in 1929. In 1935 Bloch and Henry Potez entered into an agreement to buy Société Aérienne Bordelaise (SAB), subsequently renamed Société Aéronautique du Sud-Ouest. In 1936 the arms industry in France was nationalised as the Société Nationale de Constructions Aéronautiques du Sud Ouest (SNCASO). Marcel Bloch was asked to act as delegated administrator of the Minister for Air. During the occupation of France by Nazi Germany the country's aviation industry was virtually disbanded. Marcel Bloch, being Jewish, was imprisoned by the Vichy government in October 1940. In 1944, Bloch, French Jewish individual, was deported to the Buchenwald concentration camp by the German occupiers where he remained until it was liberated on 11 April 1945.

On 10 November 1945, at an extraordinary general meeting of the Société Anonyme des Avions Marcel Bloch the company voted to change its form to a limited liability entity, Société des Avions Marcel Bloch, which was to be a holding company. On 20 January 1947 Société des Avions Marcel Bloch became Société des Avions Marcel Dassault to reflect the name adopted by Marcel Bloch's brother (Darius Paul Dassault) while being active in the French Resistance.

In 1954, Dassault established an electronics division (by 1962 named Electronique Marcel Dassault), the first action of which was to begin the development of airborne radars, soon followed by seeker heads for air-to-air missiles, navigation, and bombing aids. From the 1950s to late 1970s exports become a major part of Dassault's business; major successes were the Dassault Mirage series and the Mystere-Falcon.

In 1965 and 1966, the French government stressed to its various defense suppliers the need to specialize to maintain viable companies. Dassault was to specialise in combat and business aircraft, Nord Aviation in ballistic missiles and Sud Aviation civil and military transport aircraft and helicopters. (Nord Aviation and Sud Aviation would merge in 1970 to form Aérospatiale which would itself later merge with 2 other firms and become EADS (now Airbus).)

On 27 June 1967, Dassault (at the urging of the French government) acquired 66% of Breguet Aviation. Under the merger deal Société des Avions Marcel Dassault was dissolved on 14 December 1971, with its assets vested in Breguet, to be renamed Avions Marcel Dassault-Breguet Aviation (AMD-BA).

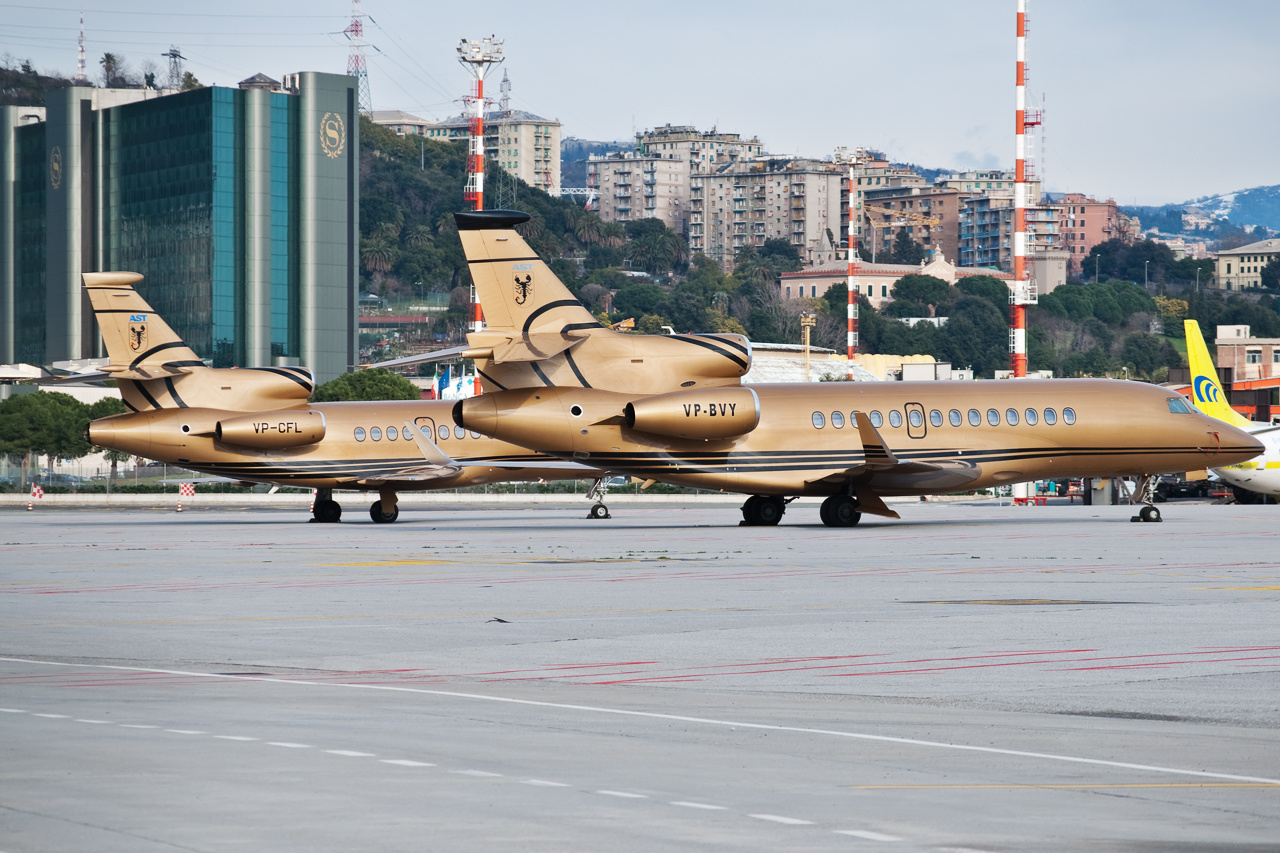
A Dassault Falcon 900 and a Dassault Falcon 7X business jet

Dassault Systèmes was established in 1981 to develop and market Dassault's CAD program, CATIA. Dassault Systèmes was to become a market leader in this field.

In 1979, the French government took a 20% share in Dassault and established the Societé de Gestion de Participations Aéronautiques (SOGEPA) to manage this and an indirect 25% share in Aerospatiale (the government also held a direct 75% share in that company). In 1998 the French government transferred its shares in Dassault Aviation (45.76%) to Aerospatiale. On 10 July 2000, Aérospatiale-Matra merged with other European companies to form EADS (presently Airbus).

In 2000, Serge Dassault resigned as chairman and was succeeded by Charles Edelstenne. Serge Dassault was appointed honorary chairman. The American company Atlantic Aviation based in Wilmington, Delaware, was acquired in October 2000.

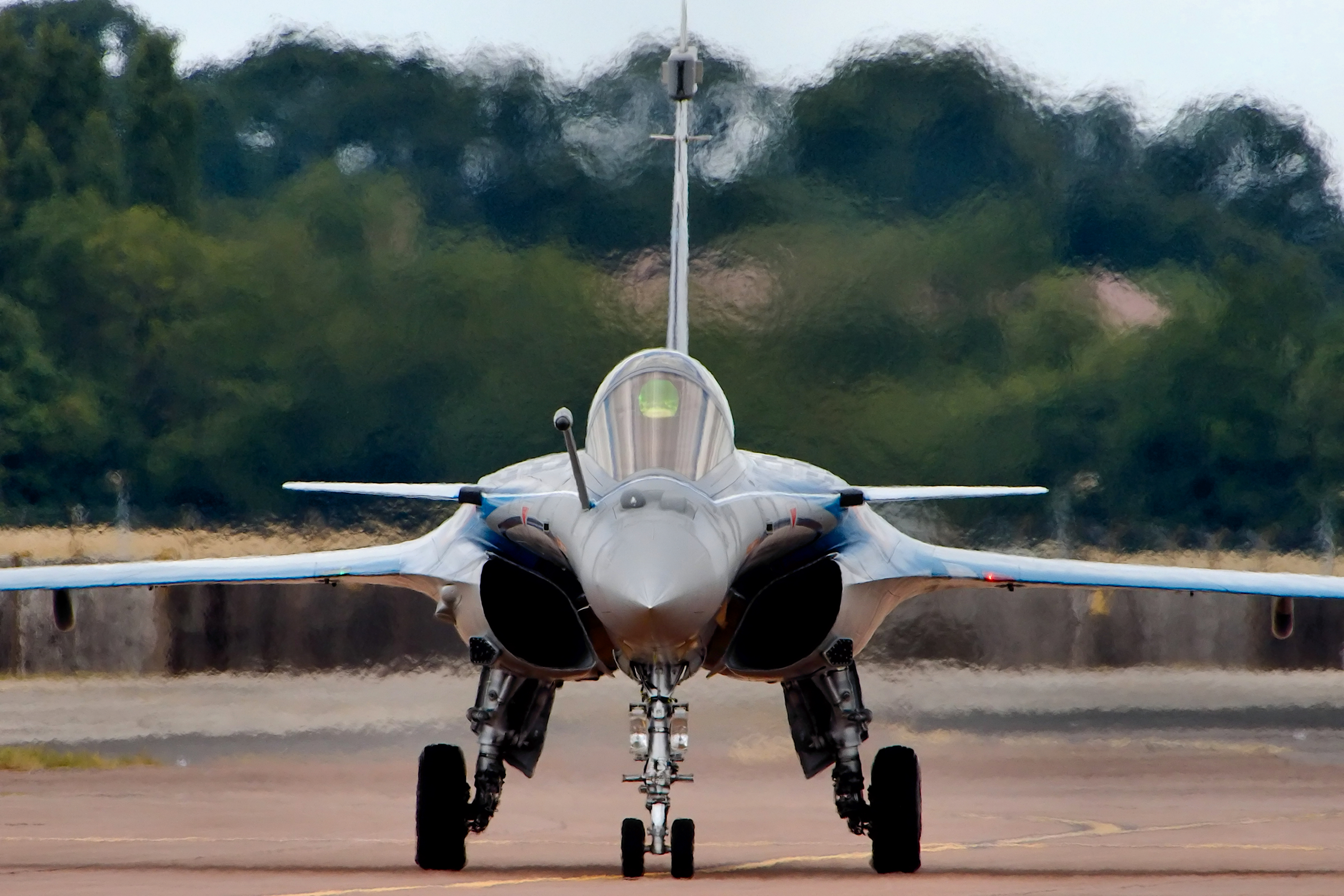
The Dassault Rafale ordered in 1988 and now in service with the French Navy and French Air Force

Airbus sold some of its ownership back to Dassault in 2014, and further reduced its share to 27% in 2015 then to 10% in 2016.

In April 2024, it was announced that Serbia would sign a deal with Dassault worth £3 billion. This was the largest weapons deal in Serbian history.

In January 2026, Harmattan AI raised $200 million (€171 million) in a funding round led by Dassault Aviation. On 13 July, Harmattan AI and Dassault Aviation carried out an initial payload test as part of the Namib project.

== Subsidiaries ==
Sogitec, a wholly owned subsidiary of Dassault, makes advanced avionics simulation, 3D imaging, military flight simulators, and document imaging systems.

== Products ==
=== Military ===
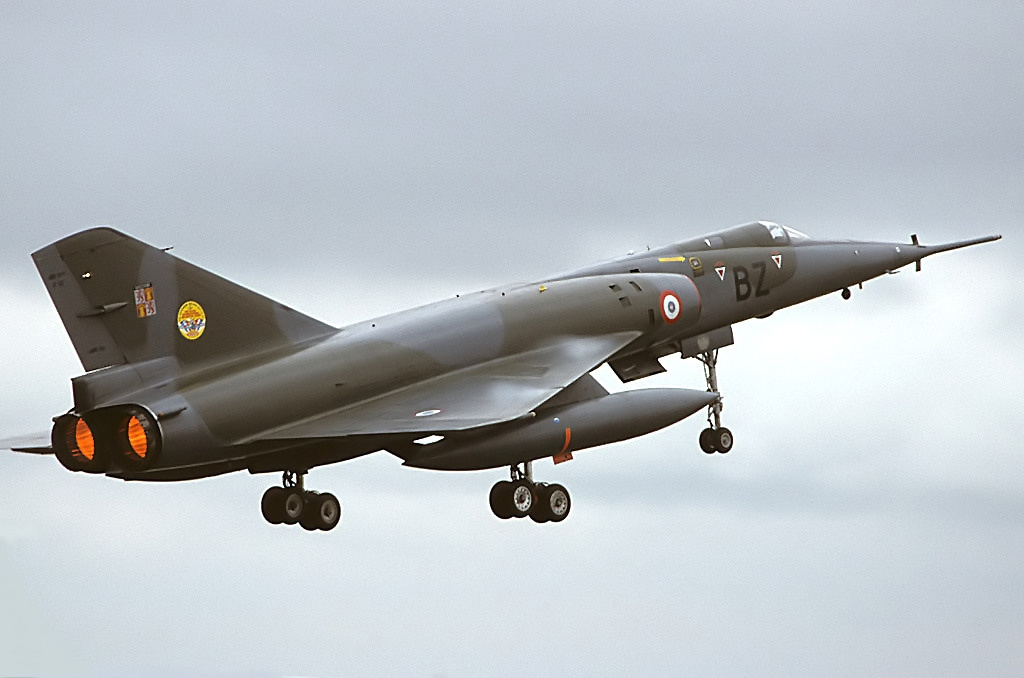
Dassault Mirage IV

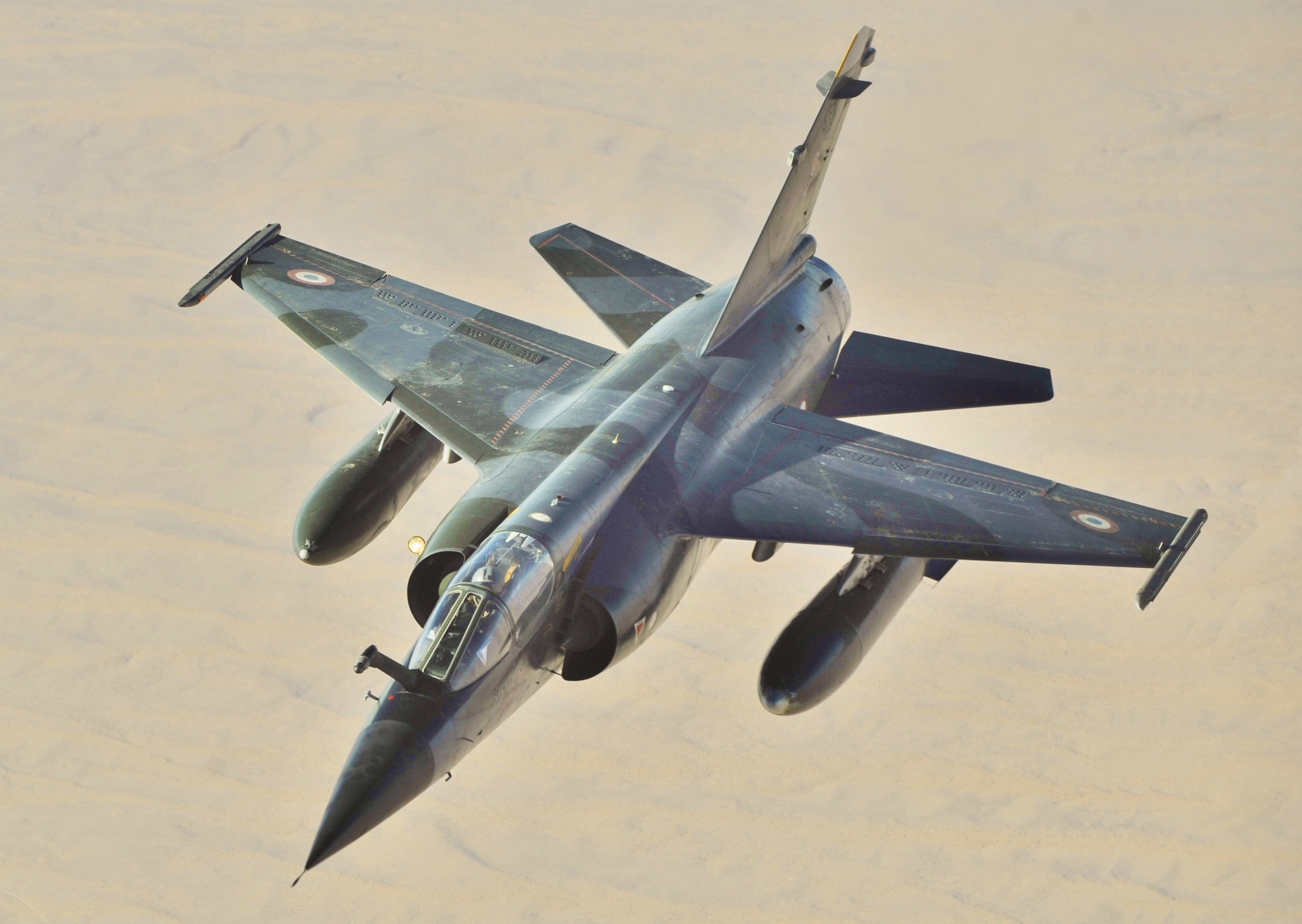
Dassault Mirage F1

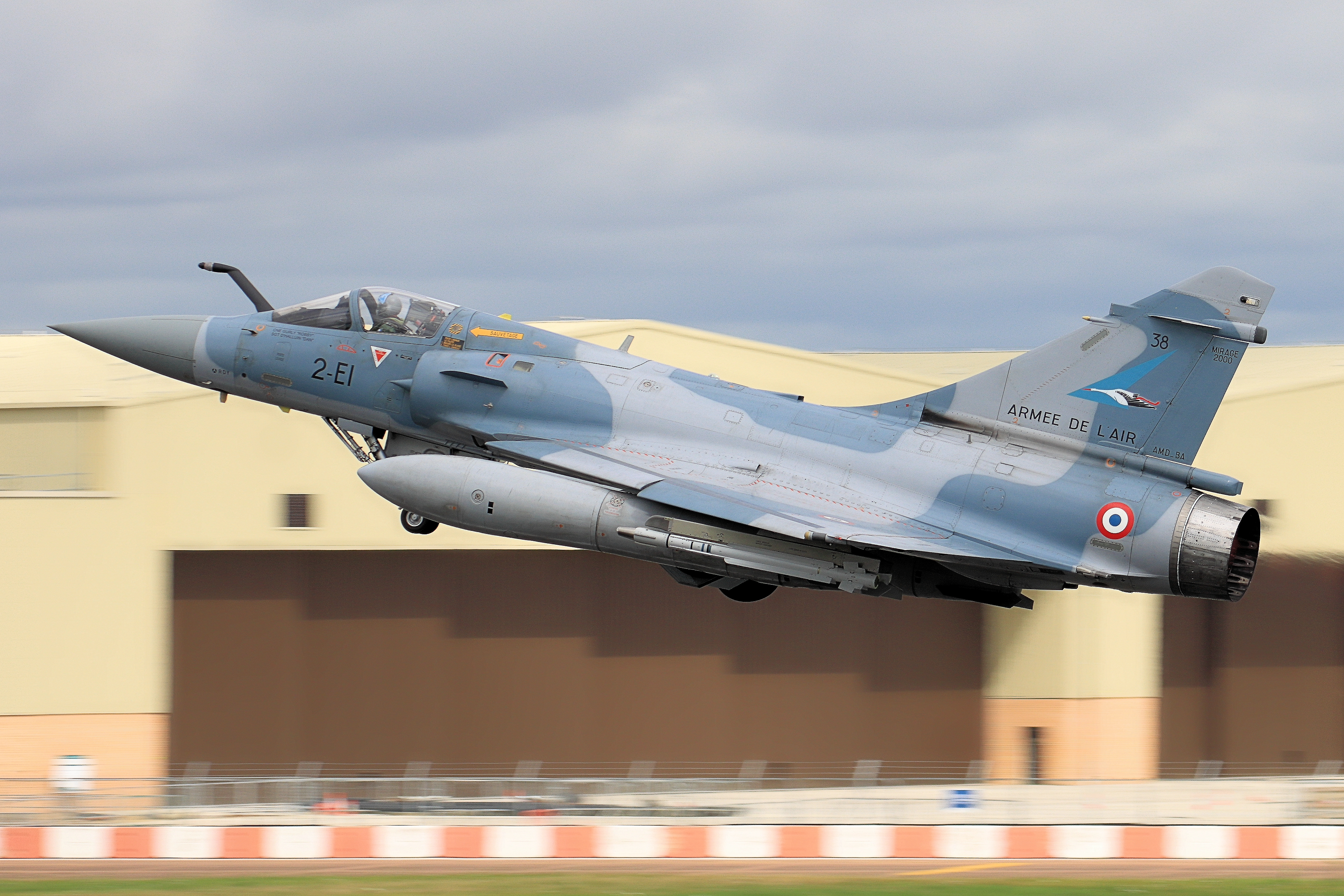
Dassault Mirage 2000

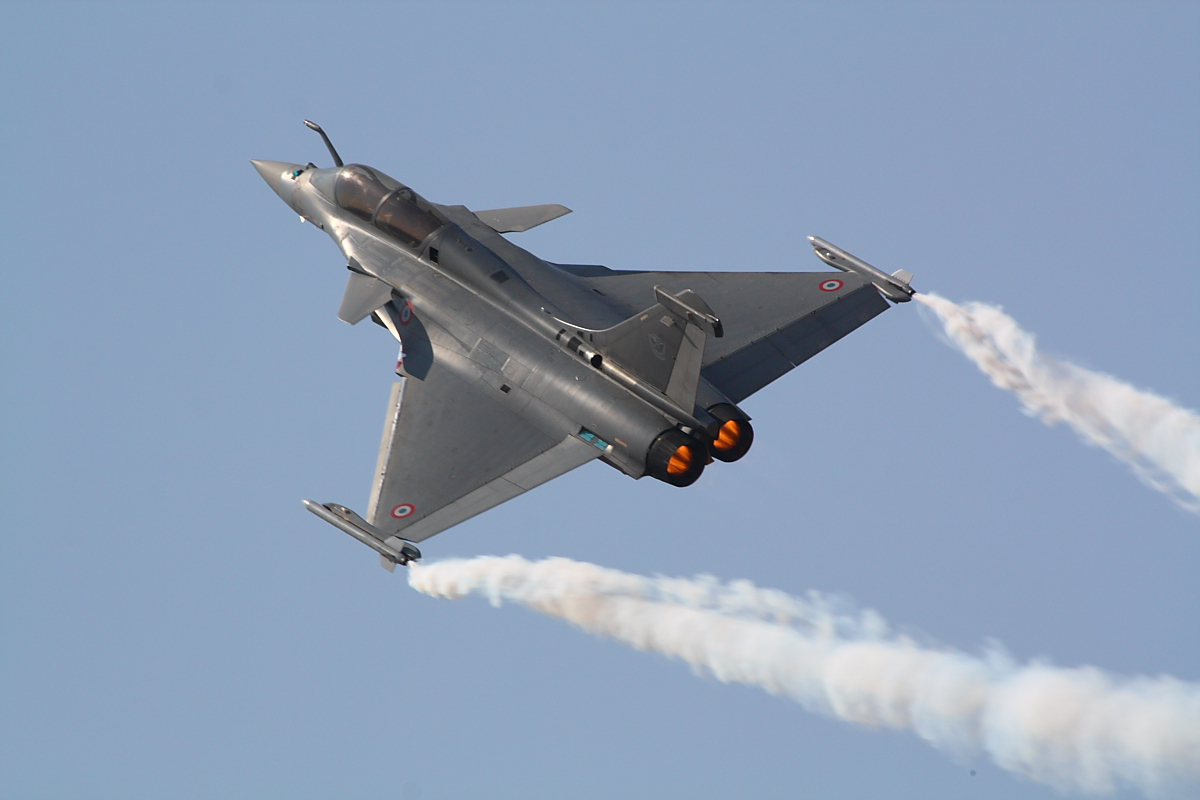
Dassault Rafale

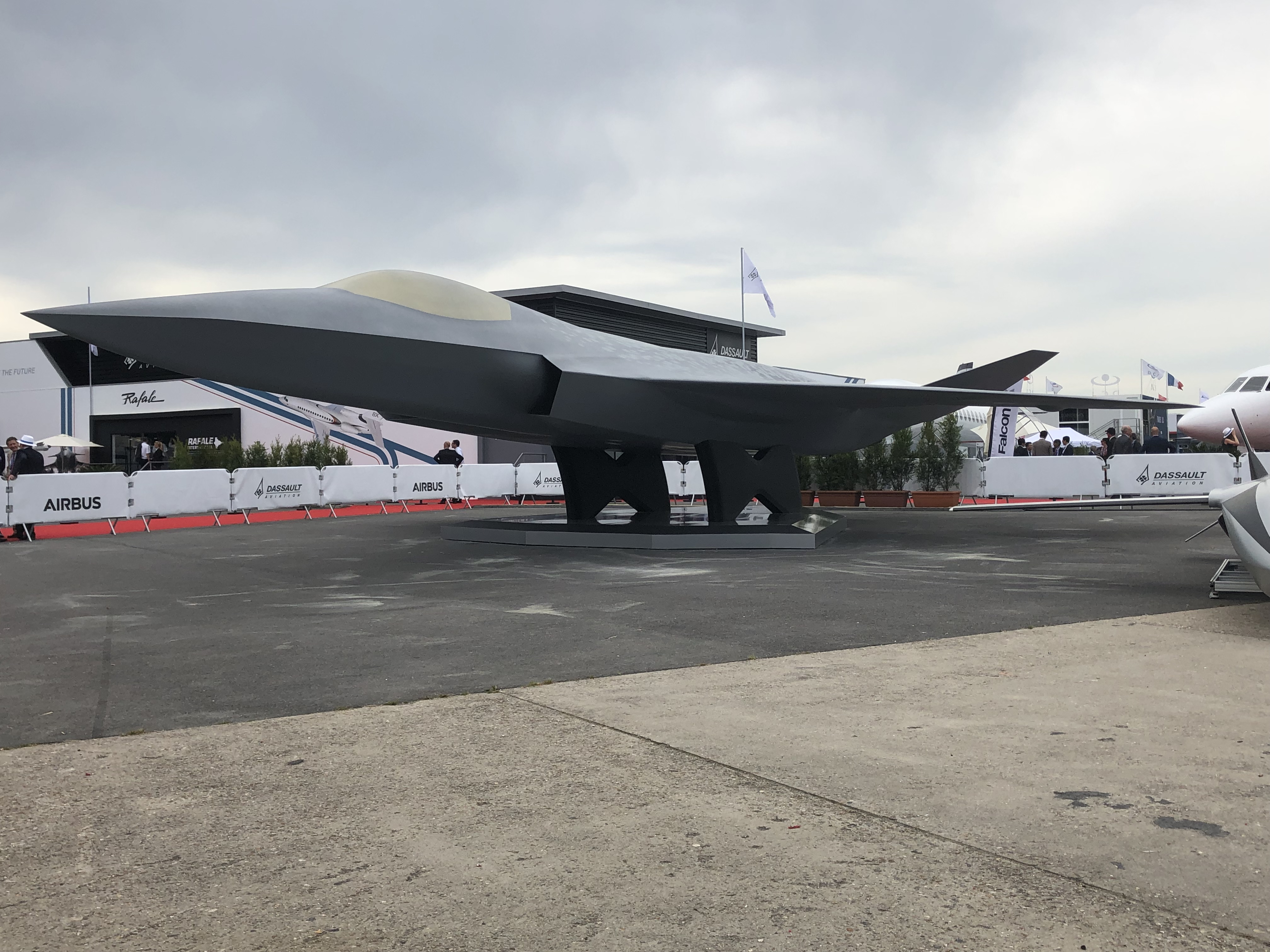
Mock-up of the New Generation Fighter

- Breguet family See main article: Dassault Breguet
- MD 315 Flamant, 1947
- MD 450 Ouragan, 1951
- Mystère, 1951
  - MD 452 Mystère I, II, III (a one-off MD-452 nightfighter), 1951
  - MD 454 Mystère IV, 1952
  - Super Mystère, 1955
- MMD 550 Mystère-Delta, 1955 prototype
- Étendard, 1956
  - Étendard II, 1956
  - Étendard IV, 1958
  - Super Étendard, 1974
- Mirage series:
  - Mirage III, 1956
  - Mirage IV (strategic bomber), 1959
  - Mirage IIIV, (1965–1966)
  - Mirage 5, 1967
  - Mirage F1, 1966
  - Mirage F2, 1966 (Prototype)
  - Mirage G, 1967
  - Mirage G-4/G-8, 1971
  - Mirage 2000, 1978
  - Mirage 2000N/2000D 1986
  - Mirage 4000, 1979 (Prototype)
  - Mirage 50, 1979
  - Mirage III NG, 1982
- Cavalier MD 610 – VSTOL concept, 1959
- MD 410 Spirale, 1960
- Balzac V, 1962 VSTOL
- Atlantique (ATL 1, originally a Breguet product), 1965
- Milan, 1968
- MD 320 Hirondelle, 1968 (light military utility aircraft, only 1 prototype was built)
- Dassault/Dornier Alpha Jet (Joint venture with Dornier) 1973
- SEPECAT Jaguar (50/50 joint venture with BAC) begun within Breguet, 1973
- Falcon Guardian 1, 1977
- Falcon Guardian 2, 1981
- Atlantique 2 (ATL 2), 1982
- Rafale, 1986
- AVE-D, (experimental, first flight 2000)
- nEUROn, (experimental, first flight 2012)
- New Generation Fighter, (Rafale replacement)

=== Civilian ===
- Breguet family See main article: Dassault Breguet
- Falcon family
  - Falcon 10 (Falcon 100 Upgraded Version)
  - Falcon 20 (Falcon 200 upgraded version)
  - Falcon 30 (Mystère 30) (30-seat airliner prototype)
  - Falcon 40 (Mystère 40) (40-seat airliner proposal)
  - Falcon 50
  - Falcon 900
  - Falcon 2000
  - Falcon 6X
  - Falcon 7X (originally Falcon FNX)
  - Falcon 8X
  - Falcon 10X (in development)
- Mercure – The only commercial airliner that ever flew made directly by Dassault Aviation. Designed to compete with Boeing 737. Only 12 units ever built.
- Communauté – Only 1 prototype was built.
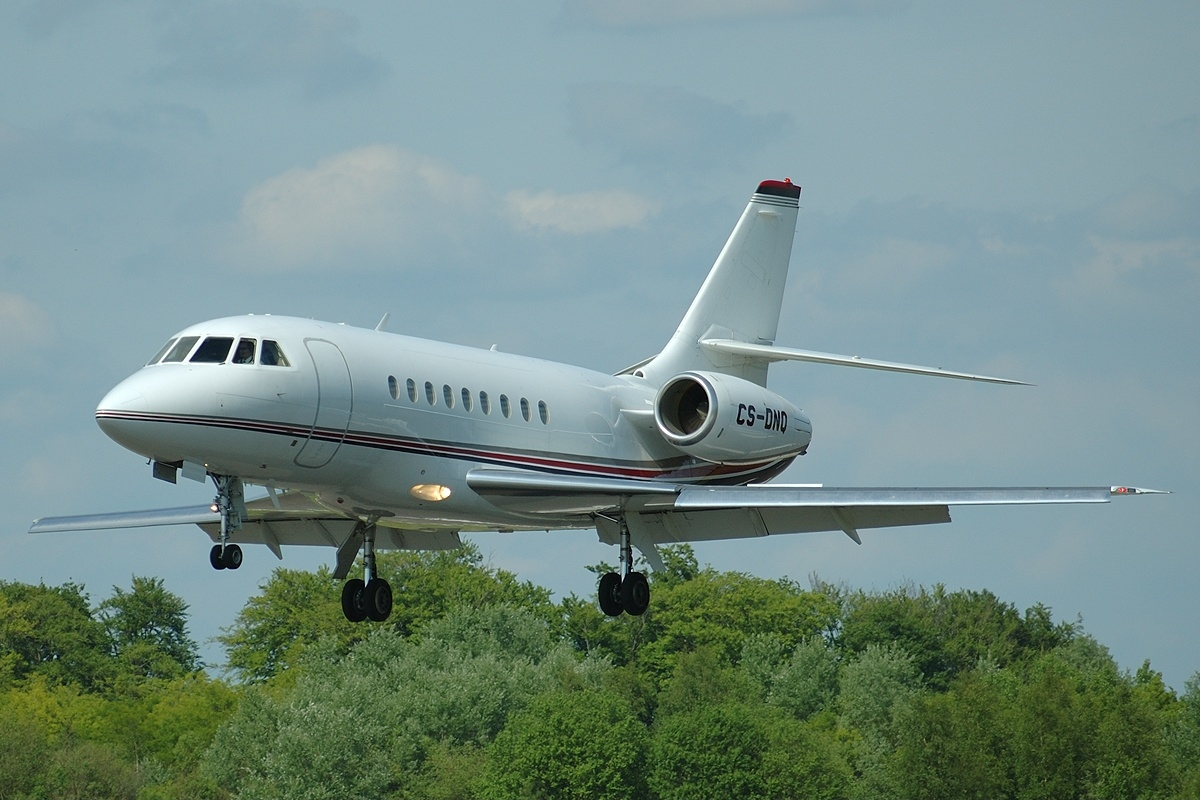
Dassault Falcon 2000

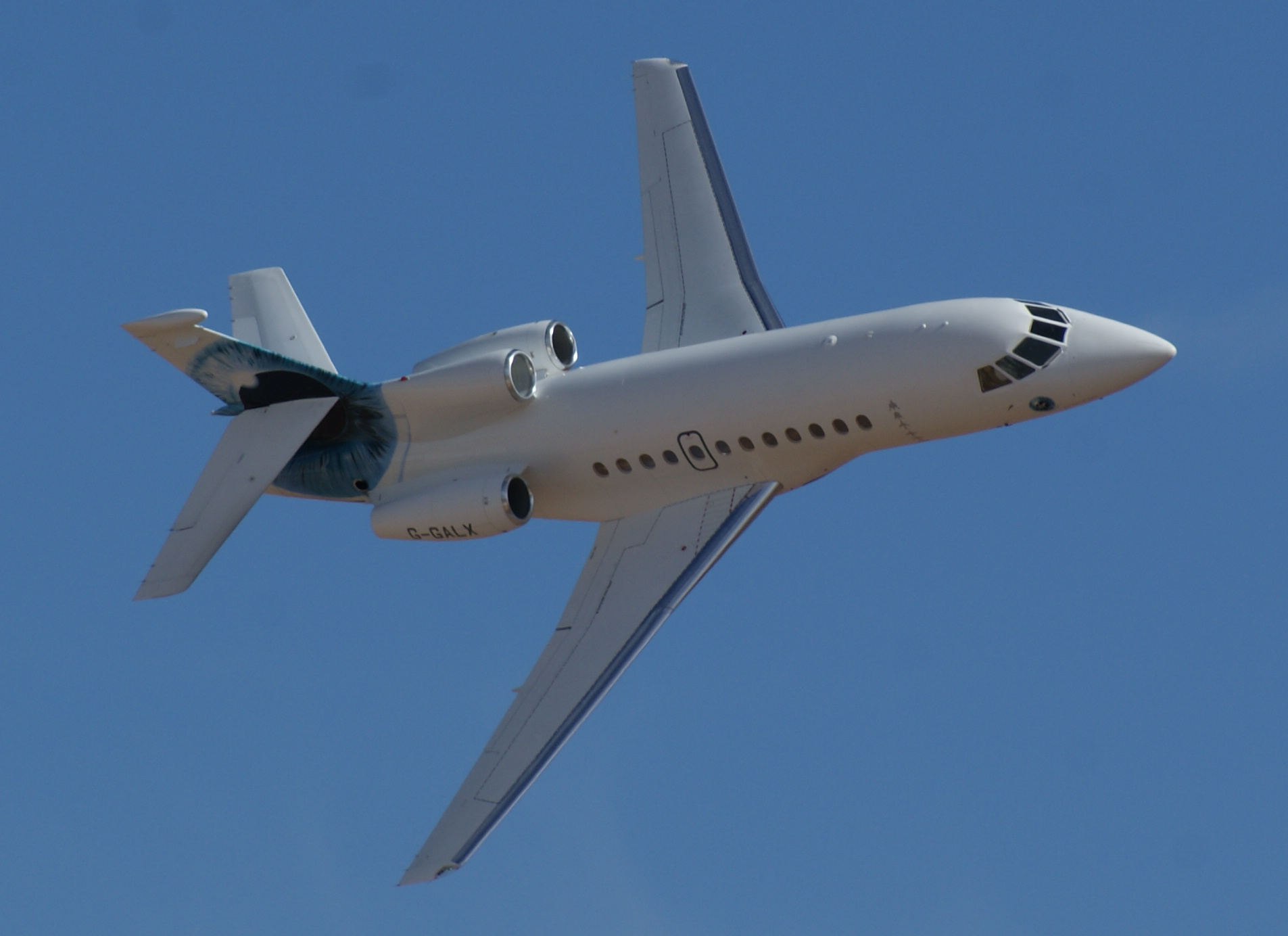
Dassault Falcon 900

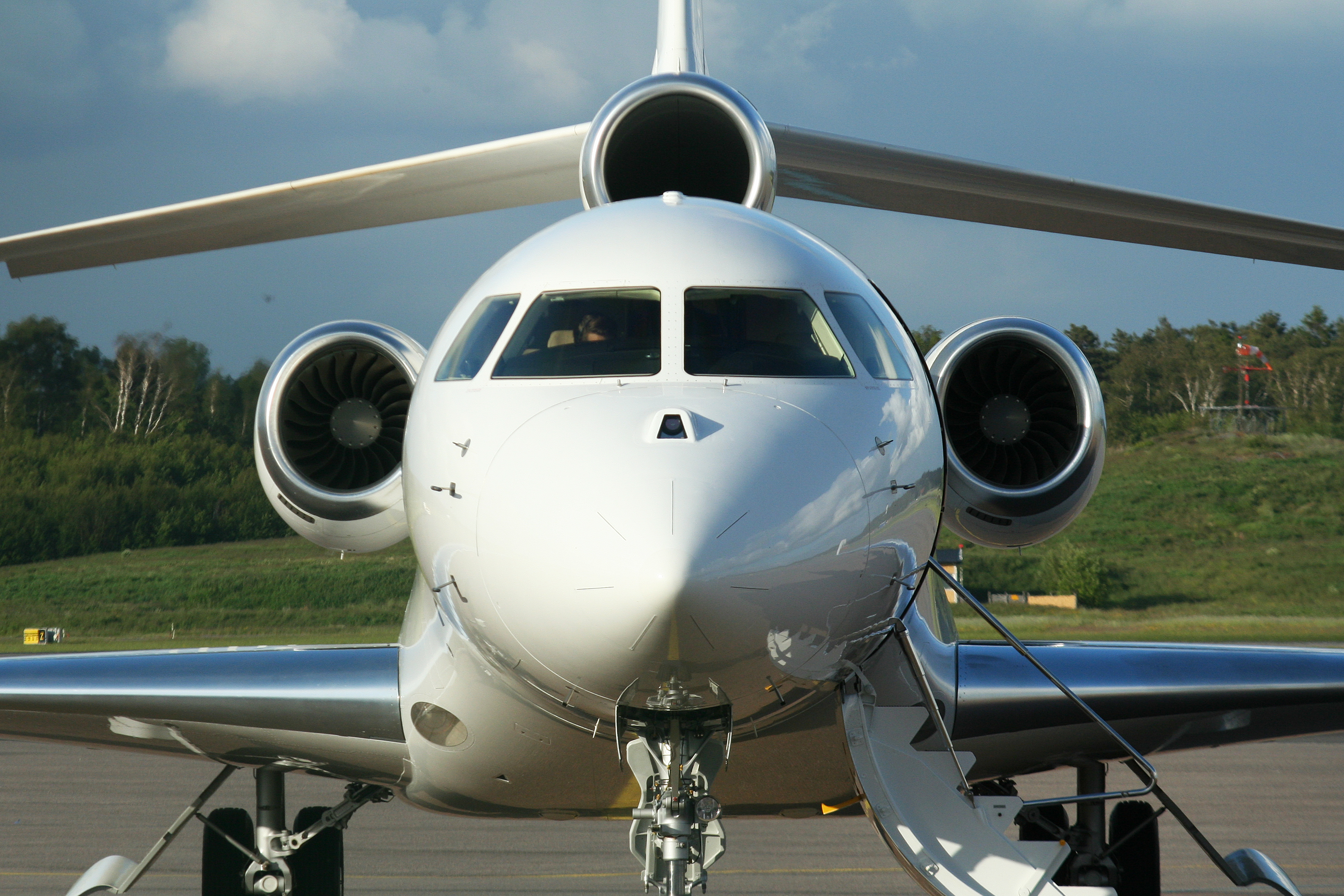
Dassault Falcon 7X

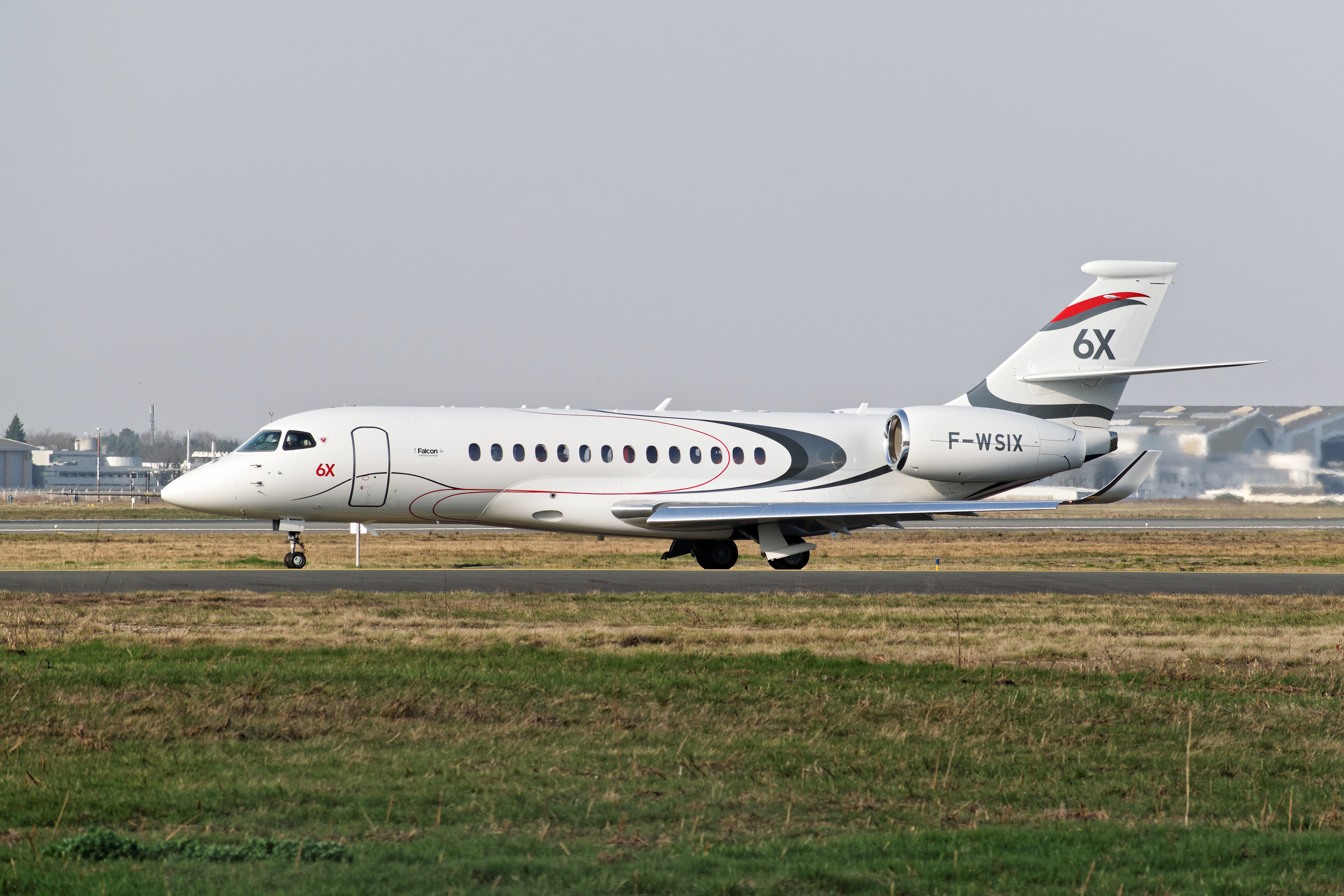
Dassault Falcon 6X

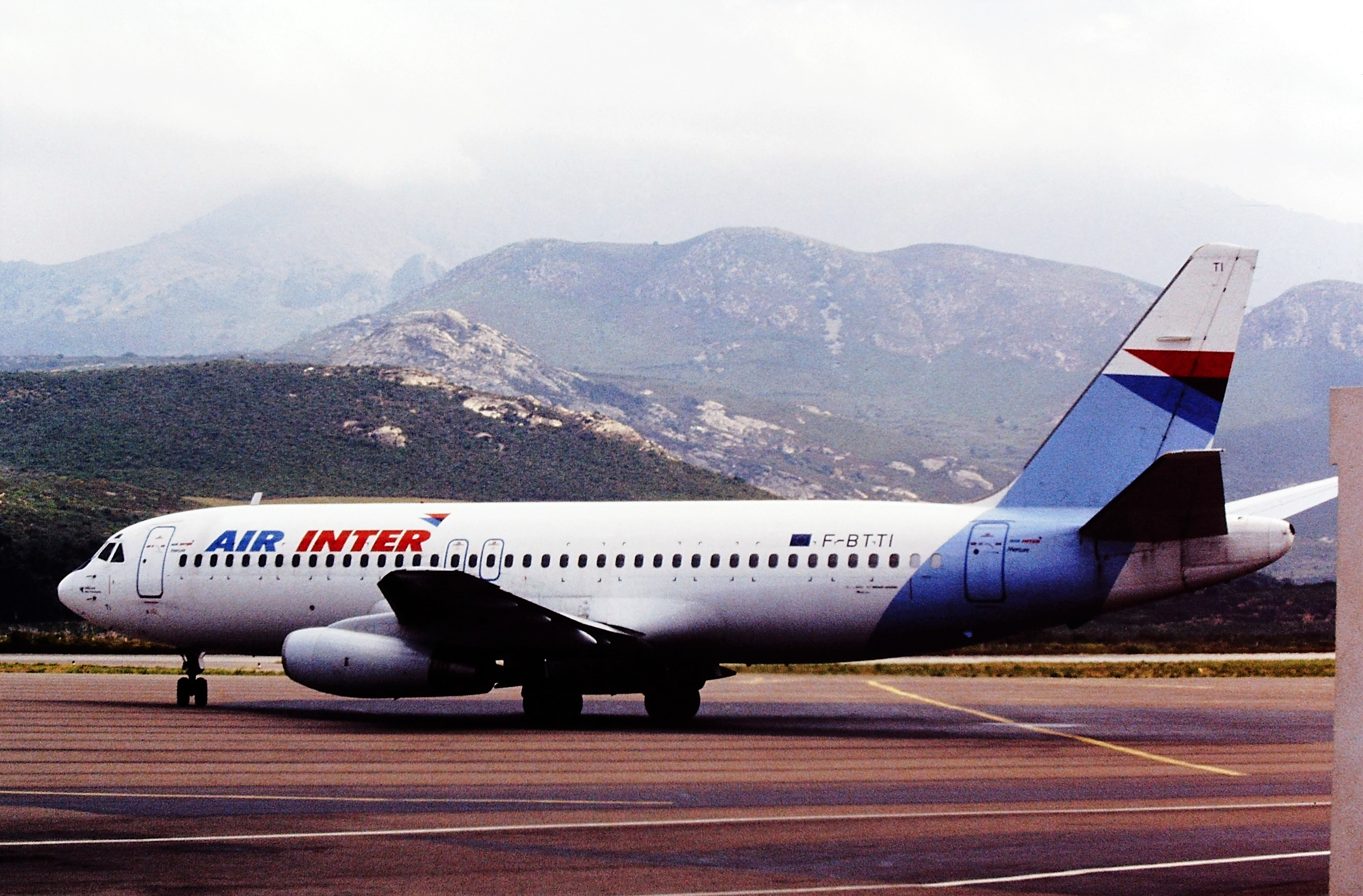
Dassault Mercure

== Facilities and offices ==
=== Production ===
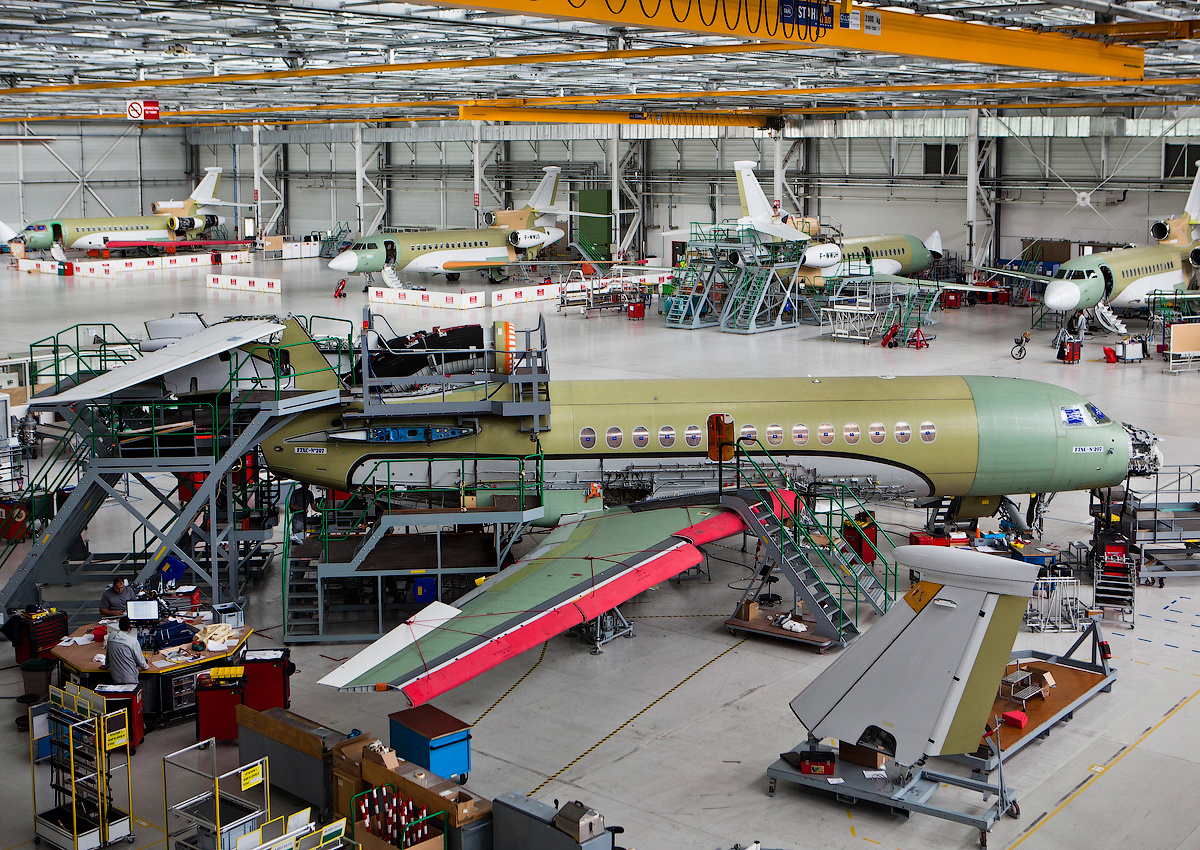
Dassault Falcon 7X assembly line at Merignac

- St. Cloud – c. 1938 former engine and fighter plant now heavy-duty simulation systems, and technical branch headquarters
- Argenteuil - c. 1952
- Biarritz – acquired Breguet plant 1971
- Merignac - c. 1947
- Talence - operating from 1939 to 1947
- Lorraine – c. 1951 as rented facility before moved to Argenteuil
- Nagpur – a Joint Venture with Reliance Aerostructure Limited (a subsidiary of Reliance Infrastructure) – operating as Dassault Reliance Aerospace Limited (DRAL) – at MIHAN at Nagpur airport, Maharashtra, India. As of 2025, the facility supplies parts for Dassault Falcon family and Dassault Rafale.
  - The facility was established in 2017, operations began later that year with the setting up of a state-of-the-art manufacturing facility at MIHAN, the first Falcon 2000 front section was delivered in 2019. By 2025, 100 major components are sourced from the facility and on 18 June, during the Paris Air Show, it was announced that the facility will be the first outside France to host the final assembly line of Dassault Falcon 2000LXS variant and the Center of Excellence (CoE) for Falcon series, including Falcon 6X and Falcon 8X programs. The first Falcon 2000 aircraft from the Indian facility is expected to take its first flight in 2028.
  - On 5 September 2025, Reuters reported that the company will sell 2% of its share in DRAL to Dassault. The transaction, worth ₹1.76 billion (equivalent to ₹1.8 billion or US$19 million in 2026), will give up the majority stake of the joint venture to the latter. The deal is expected to be closed by 1 November.

=== Service Facilities ===
- United States, France, China, Brazil
- Noida : Dassault Aviation is setting up a Maintenance, Repair and Overhaul (MRO) facility in India under a subsidiary of Dassault Aviation Maintenance Repair Overhaul India (DAMROI) for Dassault Mirage 2000 and Dassault Rafale fleet of the Indian Air Force as well as that of the Indonesian Air Force. SEPECAT Jaguar can also be provided service if required though the fleet is nearing the end of its service.

=== Sales Offices ===
- China, Greece, Malaysia, Oman, Russia, Taiwan, United States, France, India

=== DAS Network ===
- Paraguay and United States

== See also ==
- Dassault Group
- Dassault Falcon
- Dassault Rafale
- Mirage 2000
- nEUROn
