= Dassault Balzac V =

French military aircraft testbed (1962–63)

Balzac V
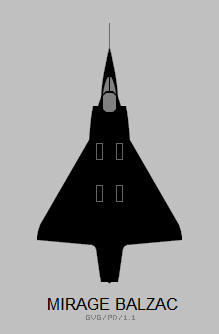
- Balzac V 001

General information
- Type: VTOL testbed
- Manufacturer: Dassault Aviation
- Status: Prototype
- Primary user: French Air Force
- Number built: 1

History
- Manufactured: 1962
- First flight: 13 October 1962
- Retired: 1963 after last flight
- Developed from: Dassault Mirage III

The Dassault Balzac V was a French vertical takeoff and landing (VTOL) testbed of the early 1960s. It was built by Dassault Aviation from a prototype Mirage III aircraft to test the configuration for the Mirage IIIV. The sole example was involved in two major accidents that killed the aircraft's pilot, and was not repaired after the second crash.

== Design and development ==
Since the Rolls-Royce RB162 lift engines specified for the Mirage IIIV were not expected to be available before 1963, Dassault modified the first Mirage III prototype to serve as an interim VTOL testbed. Eight Rolls-Royce RB108 lift engines were installed, each with an average maximum takeoff thrust of 9.83 kN (2,210 lbf). The Mirage III's Snecma Atar G.2 propulsion engine was replaced with an un-reheated (non-afterburning) Bristol Siddeley Orpheus BOr 3 with a thrust of 21.57 kN (4,850 lbf). The lift engines were grouped in tandem pairs around the aircraft's center of gravity on either side of the propulsion engine's intake duct, with each pair in a row separated by the main undercarriage wheelbays.

== Operational history ==
The Balzac V began tethered hovering on 12 October 1962 and achieved the first free hover only six days later, two months ahead of schedule. The first accelerating transition from vertical takeoff to horizontal flight took place on its seventeenth sortie on 18 March 1963.

The aircraft crashed on 10 January 1964, on its 125th sortie, during a low-altitude hover. During a vertical descent the aircraft experienced uncontrollable divergent wing oscillations, the port wing eventually striking the ground at an acute angle with the aircraft rolling over because of the continued lift engine thrust. The loss was attributed to loss of control because the stabilising limits of the three-axis autostabilisation system's 'puffer pipes' were exceeded in roll. Although airframe damage was relatively light, the Centre D'Essai en Vol test pilot, Jacques Pinier, did not eject and died in the crash.

The aircraft was rebuilt, and resumed flight testing on 2 February 1965. On 8 September 1965, the aircraft suffered another fatal crash, once again while in a low altitude hover. The aircraft was being evaluated by United States Air Force Major P. E. Neale, as part of a Franco-American information exchange on VTOL programmes. Major Neale made an unsuccessful ejection outside the ejection seat's escape envelope. The findings of the accident investigation were never made public. It was speculated that hydraulic control difficulties coupled with excessive use of the lift engines resulted in fuel starvation and the flameout of all nine engines. Once again, the damage was not irreparable, but this time the aircraft was not rebuilt, as flight development of the Mirage IIIV prototype was already underway.

The Balzac V gained its name from the co-incidence of its serial number (001) with the telephone number (BALZAC 001) of a well-known Paris movie advertising agency (Publicité Jean Mineur).

== Specifications (Balzac V) ==
Data from

General characteristics

- Crew: 1
- Length: 13.1 m (43 ft 0 in)
- Wingspan: 7.3 m (23 ft 11 in)
- Height: 4.6 m (15 ft 1 in)
- Wing area: 27.2 m^{2} (293 sq ft)
- Empty weight: 6,124 kg (13,501 lb)
- Gross weight: 7,000 kg (15,432 lb)
- Powerplant: 1 × Bristol Siddeley B.Or.3 Orpheus turbojet engine, 21.57 kN (4,850 lbf) thrust for cruise propulsion
- Powerplant: 8 × Rolls-Royce RB108-1A turbojet engines, 9.6 kN (2,200 lbf) thrust each for lift

Performance

- Maximum speed: 1,104 km/h (686 mph, 596 kn) at sea level
- Endurance: 15 minutes
- Wing loading: 257.3 kg/m^{2} (52.7 lb/sq ft)
- Thrust/weight: 1.12 (vertical flight)

== See also ==
Related development

- Dassault Mirage III
- Dassault Mirage IIIV

Aircraft of comparable role, configuration, and era

- EWR VJ 101
- Hawker Siddeley Harrier
- Hawker P.1154
- Rockwell XFV-12
- Yakovlev Yak-38
- Yakovlev Yak-141

Related lists

- List of military aircraft of France
- List of fighter aircraft
- List of VTOL aircraft

== Bibliography ==
- Breffort, Dominique and Andre Jouineau. "The Mirage III, 5, 50 and Derivatives from 1955 to 2000." Planes and Pilots 6. Paris: Histoire et Collections, 2004. ISBN 2-913903-92-4.
- Buttler, Tony and Jean-Louis Delezenne. X-Planes of Europe: Secret Research Aircraft from the Golden Age 1946-1974. Manchester, UK: Hikoki Publications, 2012. ISBN 978-1-902-10921-3
- Cuny, Jean (1989). Les avions de combat français, 2: Chasse lourde, bombardement, assaut, exploration [French Combat Aircraft 2: Heavy Fighters, Bombers, Attack, Reconnaissance]. Docavia (in French). Vol. 30. Ed. Larivière. OCLC 36836833.
- Fricker, John (November 1993). "Mirage might have beens 2: Balzac - Dassault's first VTOL variant". Air International. Vol. 45, no. 5. pp. 268–274.
- Green, William. Macdonald Aircraft Handbook. London. Macdonald & Co. (Publishers) Ltd., 1964.
- Jackson, Paul (Autumn 1993). "Mirage III/5/50 Variant Briefing: Part I". World Air Power Journal. Vol. 14. pp. 111–137. ISBN 1-874023-32-8. ISSN 0959-7050.
- Pérez, San Emeterio Carlos. Mirage: Espejismo de la técnica y de la política (in Spanish). Madrid: Armas 30. Editorial San Martin, 1978. ISBN 84-7140-158-4.
