= Dassault Mirage F2 =

French prototype attack/fighter aircraft

Mirage F2
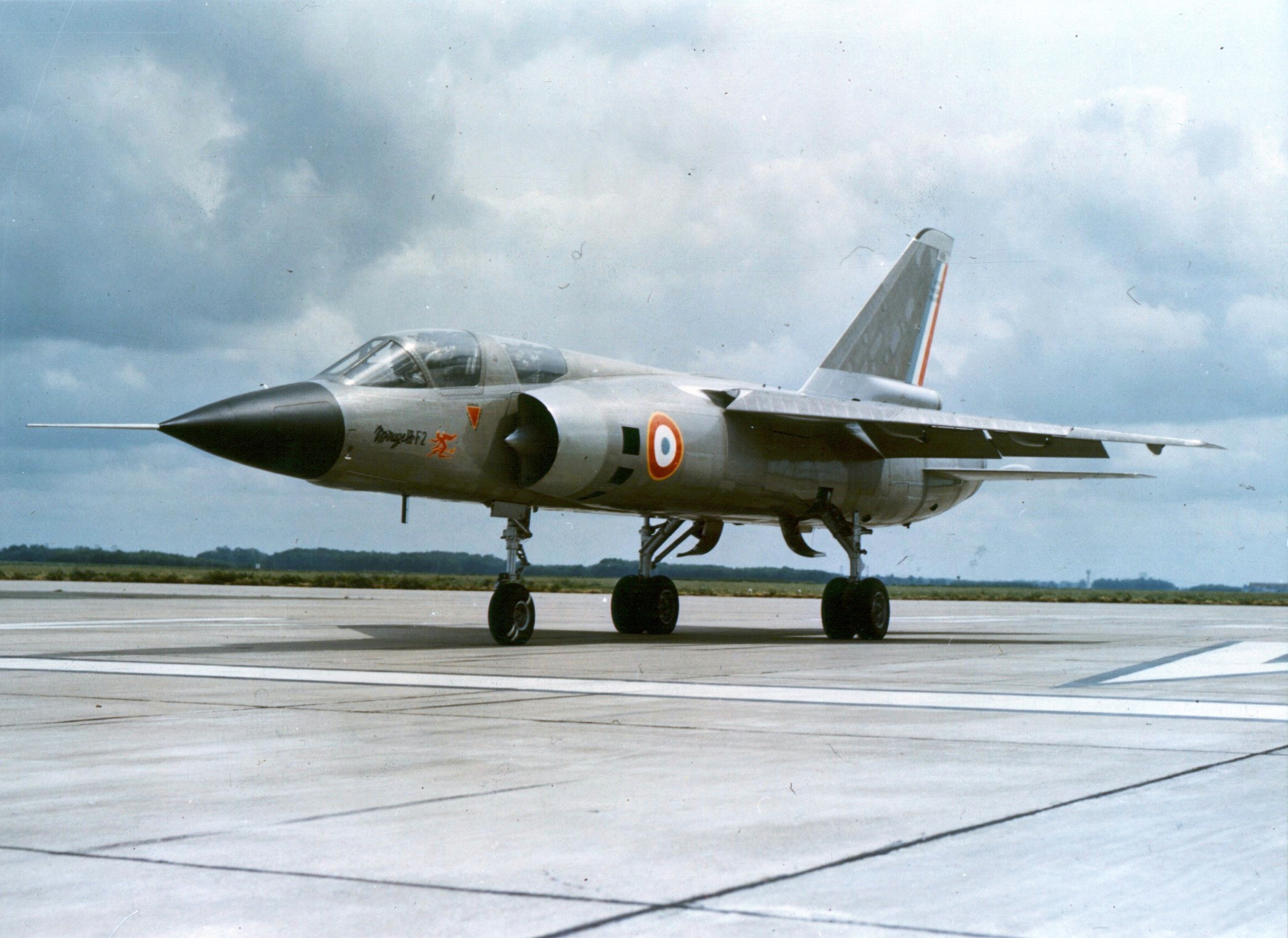

General information
- Type: Attack/fighter
- National origin: France
- Manufacturer: Dassault Aviation
- Status: Cancelled
- Number built: 1

History
- First flight: 12 June 1966
- Developed from: Dassault Mirage III
- Developed into: Dassault Mirage G

The Dassault Mirage F2 is a French prototype two-seat ground attack/fighter aircraft, which was designed to serve as a test bed for the SNECMA TF306 turbofan engine. The F2 also influenced the subsequent Dassault Mirage G, a variable geometry design.

== Design and development ==
Dassault were tasked in the early 1960s to design a low-altitude intruder that did not have the high approach speeds associated with the delta wing of the Mirage III. Unlike the Mirage III, the F2 had a high-mounted swept wing and horizontal tail surfaces. The prototype powered by a Pratt & Whitney TF30 turbofan first flew on 12 June 1966. It was re-engined with the SNECMA TF306 for the second flight on 29 December 1966.

Two parallel developments were a single-seat Mirage F3 interceptor and a scaled-down and simpler Mirage F1. Eventually the French Air Force chose to develop the French-engined F1, and the F2 did not enter production.

The fuselage and engine from the F2 formed the basis of a variable-geometry variant, the Mirage G.

== Aircraft on display ==
The Mirage F2 is now preserved with DGA Techniques Aeronautiques in Toulouse Balma.

== Specifications (Mirage F2 with TF30) ==
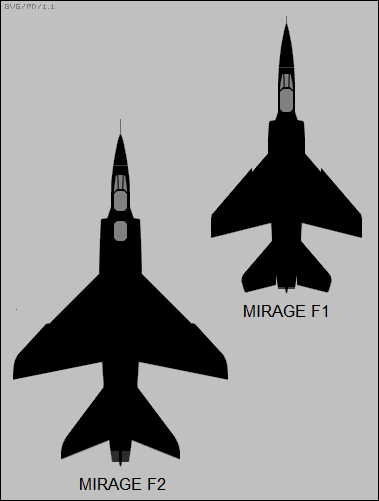

Data from the Illustrated Encyclopedia of Aircraft.

General characteristics

- Crew: 2
- Length: 17.60 m (57 ft 9 in)
- Wingspan: 10.50 m (34 ft 5 in)
- Height: 5.80 m (19 ft 0 in)
- Empty weight: 9,500 kg (20,944 lb)
- Max takeoff weight: 18,000 kg (39,683 lb)
- Powerplant: 1 × Pratt & Whitney TF30 turbofan, 89 kN (20,000 lbf) thrust

Performance

- Maximum speed: 2,333 km/h (1,450 mph, 1,260 kn)
- Maximum speed: Mach 2.2
- Service ceiling: 20,000 m (66,000 ft)

== See also ==
Related development

- Dassault Mirage III
- Dassault Mirage F1
- Dassault Mirage G

== Bibliography ==
- Buttler, Tony (2015). X-Planes of Europe. Vol. II: Military Prototype Aircraft from the Golden Age 1946–1974. Manchester, UK: Hikoki Publications. ISBN 978-1-90210-948-0.
- Carbonel, Jean-Christophe (2016). French Secret Projects. Vol. 1: Post War Fighters. Manchester, UK: Crecy Publishing. ISBN 978-1-91080-900-6.
- The Illustrated Encyclopedia of Aircraft (Part Work 1982-1985). Orbis Publishing.
