= F111 (disambiguation) =

The General Dynamics F-111 Aardvark is a U.S. jet fighter-bomber aircraft.

F111 or variation, may also refer to:

== Military ==
=== Combat aircraft ===
  - General Dynamics–Grumman F-111B, the navy carrier variant
  - General Dynamics–Grumman EF-111A Raven, the electronic warfare variant
  - General Dynamics–Boeing AFTI/F-111A Aardvark, a research variant
  - General Dynamics F-111C, the Australian variant
  - General Dynamics F-111K, the British variant
- Canadair CF-111 Starfighter (F-111, CF-104), the Canadian variant of the F-104

=== Warships ===
- HMNZS Te Mana (F111), an ANZAC-class frigate of New Zealand
- HMNZS Otago (F111), a Rothesay-class frigate of New Zealand
- BNS Shadhinota (F111), a Type-056 corvette of Bangladesh
- Romanian frigate Mărășești (F-111), a frigate of Romania, former flagship of the fleet

== Other uses ==
- Hispania F111, a 2011 HRT Formula 1 racecar
- Agile Warrior F-111X, a 1995 videogame based on the fighter-bomber
- "F-111" (song), a 2003 song by 'Cold Chisel' off the album Ringside (Cold Chisel album)

== See also ==
- VFC-111, U.S. Navy fighter squadron
- VF-111, U.S. Navy fighter squadron
- VMF-111, U.S. Marines fighter squadron
- F3 (disambiguation)
- F11 (disambiguation)
- F1 (disambiguation)
