= 11F =

11F or 11f may refer to:

- GCR Class 11F, a class of British 4-4-0 steam locomotive
- Kepler-11f, an exoplanet orbiting the star Kepler-11

== See also ==
- F11 (disambiguation)
