= F11 =

F11 or F-11 may refer to:

== Military ==
- F 11 Nyköping, a Swedish Air Force wing
- F-11 Tiger, a 1954 U.S. Navy jet fighter originally designated F11F
- F11C Goshawk, a 1932 U.S. Navy biplane fighter
- Hughes XF-11, a 1946 U.S. Army Air Forces reconnaissance aircraft prototype
- Italian submarine F11, a submarine of the Italian Regia Marina (Royal Navy) in commission from 1916 to 1919

== Science and academia ==
- Trichlorofluoromethane, a refrigerant used before 1995
- Factor XI, a clotting agent found in blood

== Sports ==
- F11 (classification), a classification in para-athletics

== Technology ==
- F11, a function key on a computer keyboard (enters and exits fullscreen mode in many web browsers)
- Fujifilm FinePix F11, a digital camera model

== Transportation ==
- Chery F11, a 2008 Chinese Chery Automobile model
- Fairchild F-11 Husky, a 1946 Canadian bush plane
- Falconar F11 Sporty, a Canadian amateur-built aircraft design
- Fokker F.11, a 1928 flying boat

== Other uses ==
- Finger Eleven, a Canadian alternative rock band
- Forest Eleven, a group of rainforest countries

== See also ==
- 11F (disambiguation)
