= General Dynamics–Grumman F-111B =

US Navy prototype long range interceptor (1965)

F-111B
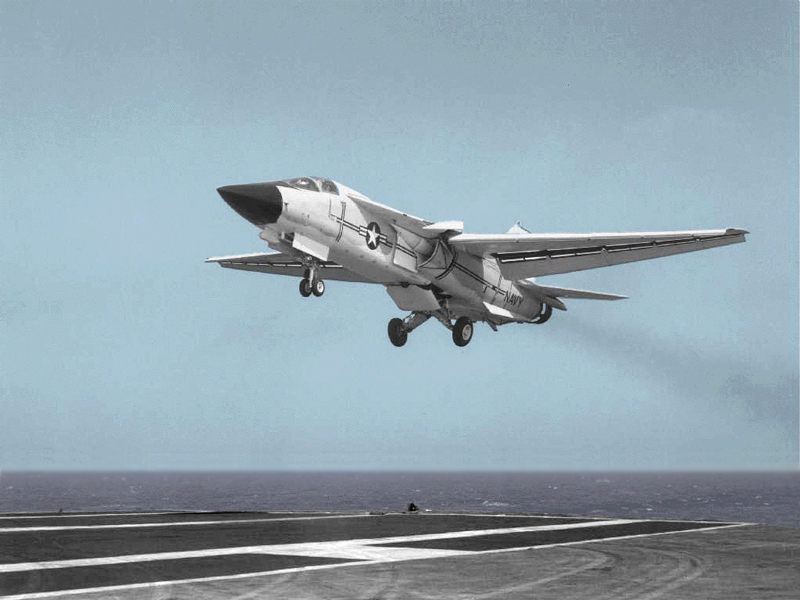
- F-111B, BuNo 151974, approaching USS Coral Sea in July 1968

General information
- Type: Interceptor
- National origin: United States
- Manufacturer: General Dynamics and Grumman
- Primary user: United States Navy
- Number built: 7

History
- First flight: 18 May 1965
- Developed from: General Dynamics F-111 Aardvark

The General Dynamics–Grumman F-111B is a long-range carrier-based interceptor aircraft planned as a follow-up to the McDonnell Douglas F-4 Phantom II for the United States Navy (USN).

The F-111B was developed during the 1960s by General Dynamics in conjunction with Grumman for the U.S. Navy as part of the joint Tactical Fighter Experimental (TFX) with the United States Air Force (USAF) to produce a common fighter for the services that could perform a variety of missions. It incorporated innovations such as variable-geometry wings, afterburning turbofan engines, and a long-range radar and missile weapons system.

Designed in parallel with the F-111 "Aardvark", which was adopted by the Air Force as a strike aircraft, the F-111B suffered development issues and changing Navy requirements for an aircraft with maneuverability for dogfighting. The F-111B was not ordered into production and the F-111B prototypes were used for testing before being retired. The planned F-111B was replaced by the smaller and lighter Grumman F-14 Tomcat, which carried over the AWG-9 radar/Phoenix missile system, engines, and a similar swing-wing configuration.

== Development ==
=== Background ===
The F-111B was part of the 1960s TFX program. The USAF's Tactical Air Command (TAC) was largely concerned with the fighter-bomber and deep strike/interdiction roles; their version of the aircraft would be a follow-on to the Republic F-105 Thunderchief fighter-bomber. In June 1960, the USAF issued a specification for a long-range interdiction and strike aircraft able to penetrate Soviet air defenses at very low altitudes and very high speeds to deliver tactical nuclear weapons against crucial targets.

Meanwhile, the U.S. Navy sought a long-range, high-endurance interceptor to defend its aircraft carrier battle groups against long-range anti-ship missiles launched from Soviet jet bombers, such as the Tupolev Tu-16, Tupolev Tu-22, and Tupolev Tu-22M, along with submarines. The Navy needed a Fleet Air Defense (FAD) aircraft with a more powerful radar, and longer range missiles than the F-4 Phantom II to intercept both enemy bombers and missiles.

=== Tactical Fighter Experimental (TFX) ===
The Air Force and Navy requirements appeared to be different. However, on 14 February 1961, the new U.S. Secretary of Defense, Robert McNamara, formally directed that the services study the development of a single aircraft that would satisfy both requirements. Early studies indicated the best option was to base the Tactical Fighter Experimental (TFX) on the Air Force requirement and a modified version for the Navy. In June 1961, Secretary McNamara ordered the go ahead on TFX despite Air Force and Navy efforts to keep their programs separate.

The USAF and the Navy could only agree on swing-wing, two seat, twin engine design features. The USAF wanted a tandem seat aircraft for low level penetration, while the Navy wanted a shorter, high altitude interceptor with side by side seating. Also, the USAF wanted the aircraft designed for 7.33 g with Mach 2.5 speed at altitude and Mach 1.2 speed at low level with a length of approximately 70 ft (21 m). The Navy had less strenuous requirements of 6 g with Mach 2 speed at altitude and high subsonic speed (approx. Mach 0.9) at low level with a length of 56 ft (17.1 m). The Navy also wanted a 48-inch (120 cm) radar dish for long range and a maximum takeoff weight of 50,000 pounds (23,000 kg). So McNamara developed a basic set of requirements for TFX based largely on the Air Force's requirements. He changed to a 36-inch (91 cm) dish for compatibility and increased the maximum weight to approximately 60,000 lb (27,200 kg) for the Air Force version and 55,000 lb (24,900 kg) for the Navy version. Then on 1 September 1961 he ordered the USAF to develop it.

A request for proposal (RFP) for the TFX was provided to industry in October 1961. In December of that year Boeing, General Dynamics, Lockheed, McDonnell, North American and Republic submitted their proposals. The proposal evaluation group found all the proposals lacking, but the best should be improved with study contracts. Boeing and General Dynamics were selected to enhance their designs. Three rounds of updates to the proposals were conducted with Boeing being picked by the selection board. Instead Secretary McNamara selected General Dynamics' proposal in November 1962 due to its greater commonality between Air Force and Navy TFX versions. The Boeing aircraft versions shared less than half of the major structural components. General Dynamics signed the TFX contract in December 1962. A Congressional investigation followed but did not change the selection.

=== Design phase ===
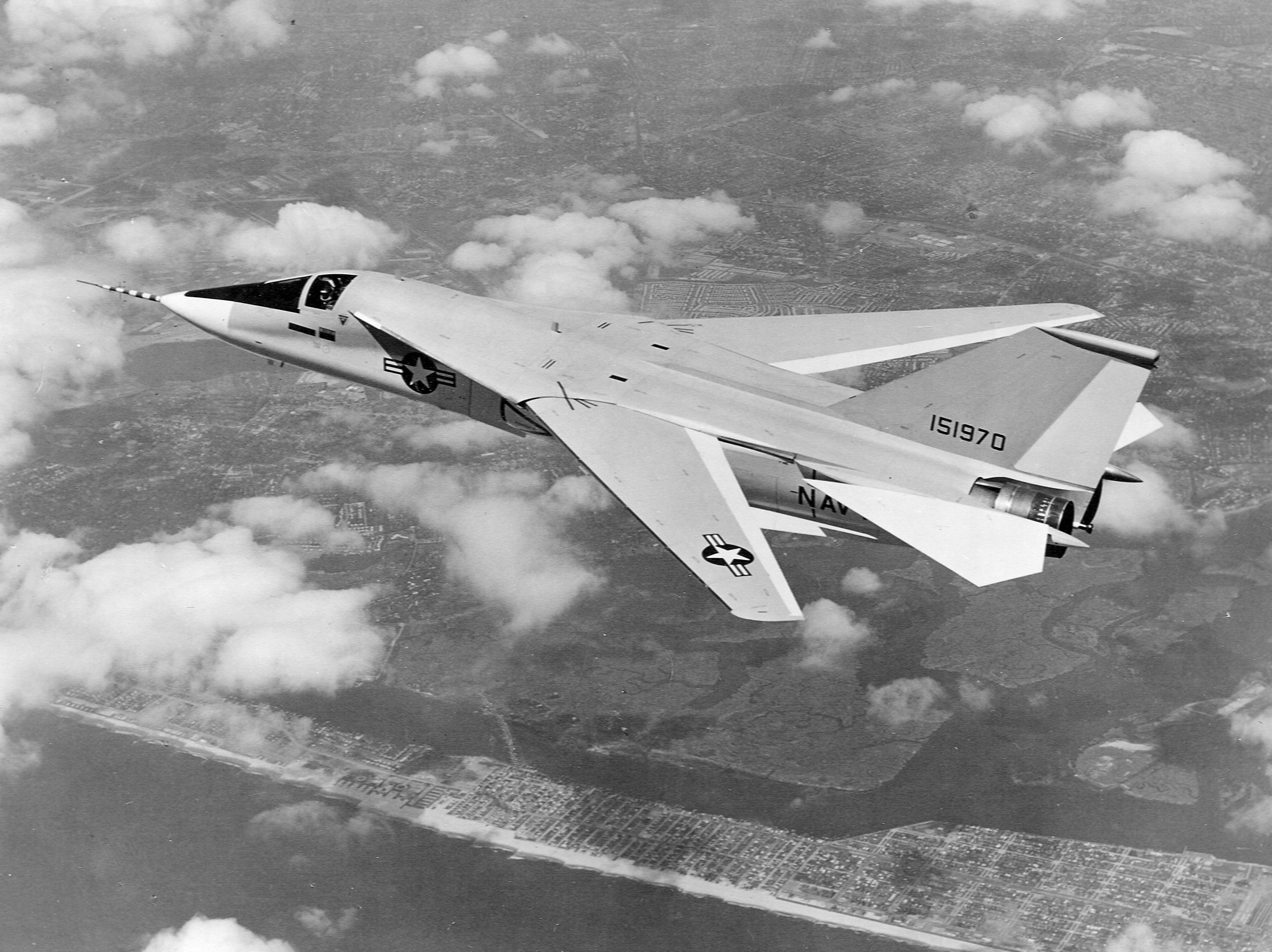
F-111B, BuNo 151970 in flight over Long Island, New York, in 1965

The Air Force F-111A and Navy F-111B variants used the same airframe structural components and TF30-P-1 turbofan engines. They featured side by side crew seating in an escape capsule as required by the Navy, versus individual ejection seats. The F-111B's nose was 8.5 feet (2.59 m) shorter due to its need to fit on existing carrier elevator decks, and had a 3.5-foot (1.07 m) longer wingspan to improve on-station endurance time. The Navy version would carry an AN/AWG-9 Pulse-Doppler radar and six AIM-54 Phoenix missiles. The Air Force version would carry the AN/APQ-113 attack radar and the AN/APQ-110 terrain-following radar and air-to-ground ordnance.

Lacking experience with carrier-based fighters, General Dynamics teamed with Grumman for assembly and test of the F-111B aircraft. In addition, Grumman would also build the F-111A's aft fuselage and the landing gear. The first test F-111A was powered by YTF30-P-1 turbofans and used a set of ejection seats, since the escape capsule was not yet available. It first flew on 21 December 1964. The first F-111B was also equipped with ejection seats and first flew on 18 May 1965. To address stall issues in certain parts of the flight regime, the F-111's engine inlet design was modified in 1965–66, ending with the "Triple Plow I" and "Triple Plow II" designs. The F-111A achieved a speed of Mach 1.3 in February 1965 with an interim intake design.

=== F-111B ===
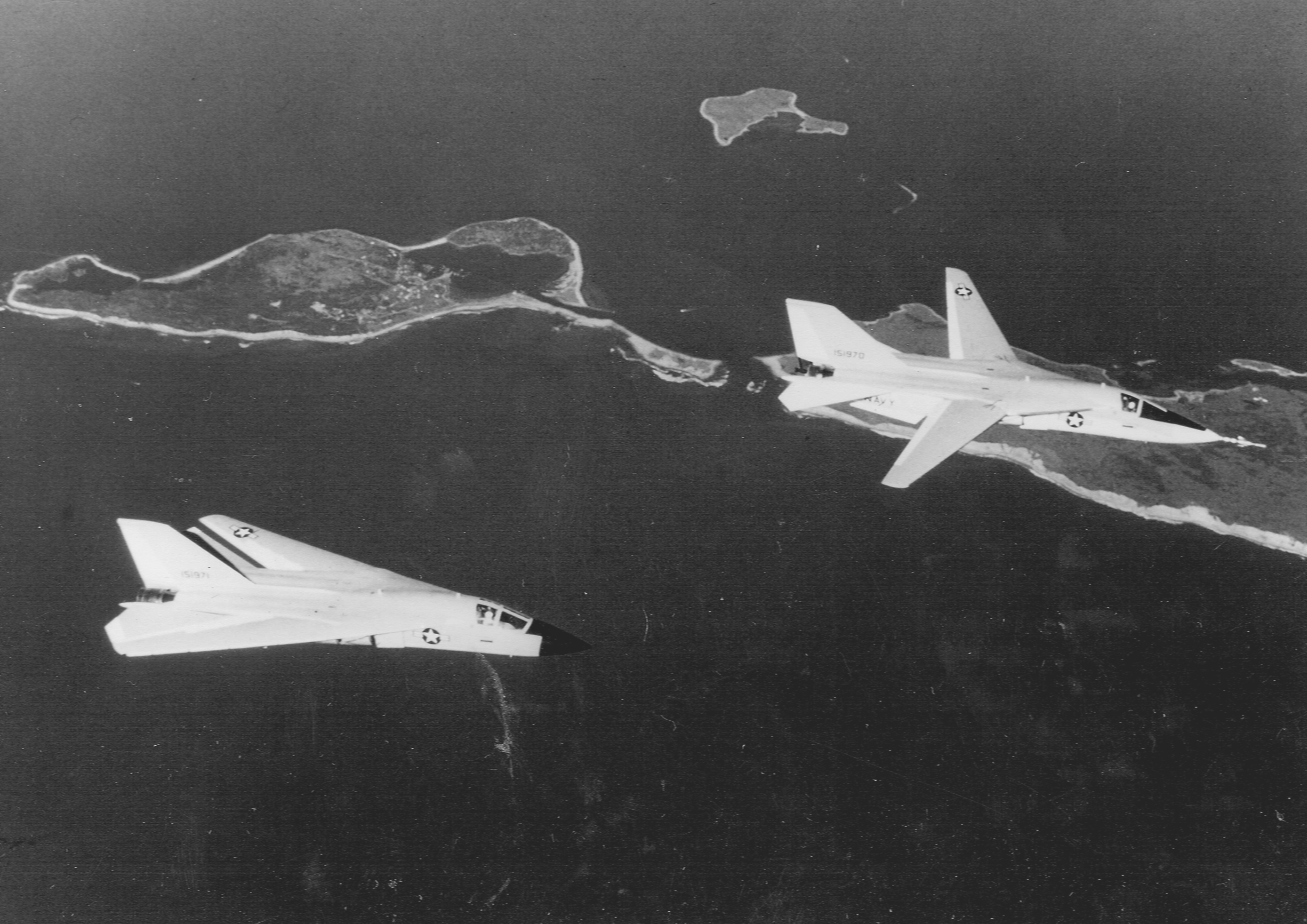
F-111Bs, BuNo 151970 and 151971, over Long Island during testing

The weight goals for both F-111 versions proved to be overly optimistic. Excessive weight plagued the F-111B throughout its development. The prototypes were far over the requirement weight. Design efforts reduced airframe weight but were offset by the addition of the escape capsule. The additional weight made the aircraft underpowered. Lift was improved by changes to the wing control surfaces. A higher thrust version of the engine was planned.

With the F-111B program in distress, Grumman began studying improvements and alternatives. In 1966, the Navy awarded Grumman a contract to begin studying advanced fighter designs. Grumman narrowed down these designs to its Model 303 design; with this, the F-111B's end appeared near by mid-1967.

During March 1968 congressional hearings for the aircraft, Vice Admiral Thomas F. Connolly, then Deputy Chief of Naval Operations for Air Warfare, responded to a question from Senator John C. Stennis as to whether a more powerful engine would cure the aircraft's woes, saying, "There isn't enough power in all Christendom to make that airplane what we want!" By May 1968 both Armed Services committees of Congress voted not to fund production and in July 1968 the DoD ordered work stopped on F-111B. A total of seven F-111Bs were delivered by February 1969.

=== Replacement ===
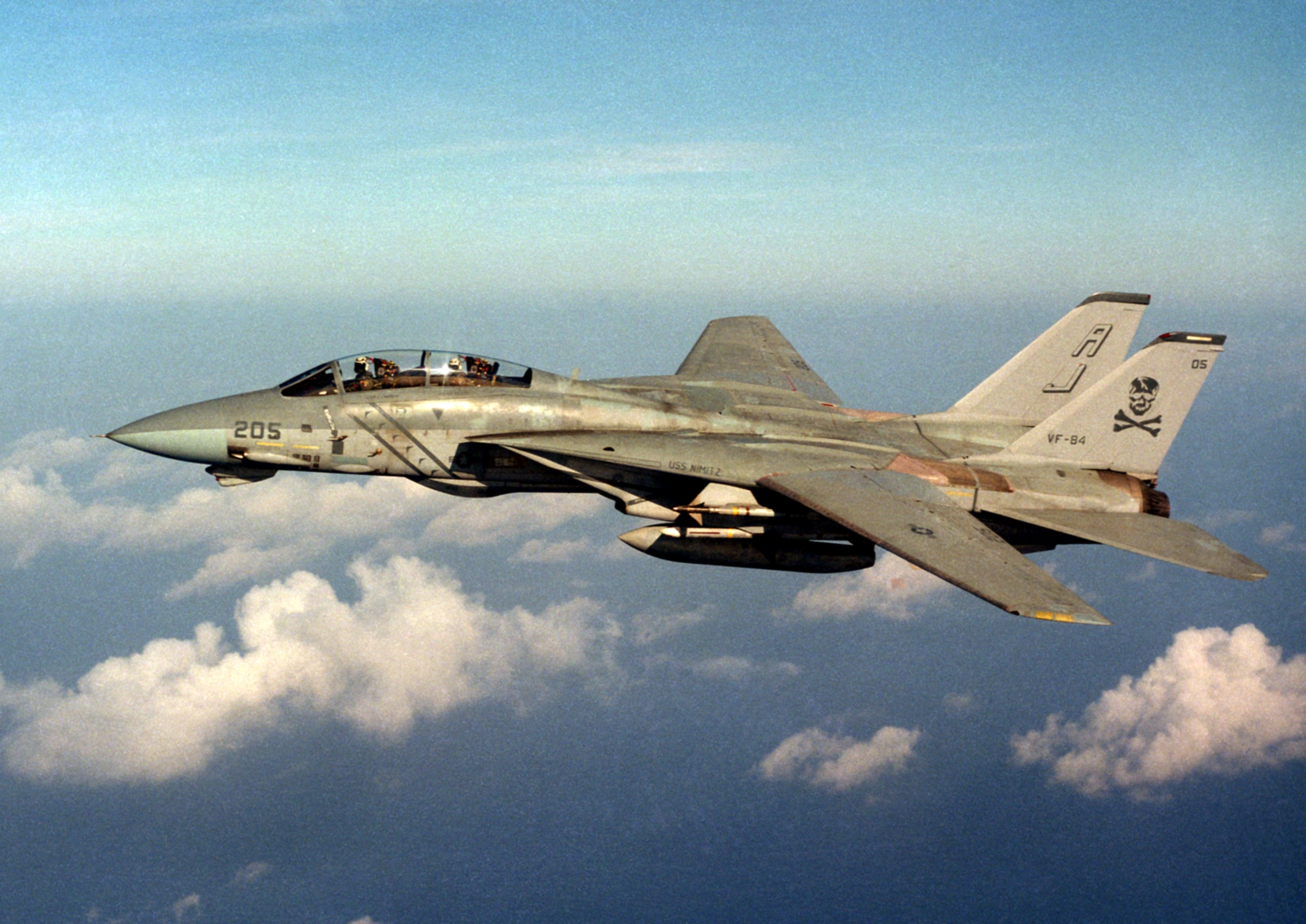
The F-14 that Grumman proposed as a replacement for the F-111B, was designed around the same engine/radar/missile combination.

The F-111B's replacement eventually entered service as the Grumman F-14 Tomcat. It was derived from Grumman's initial Model 303 design and reused the TF30 engines from the F-111B, though the Navy planned on replacing them with an improved engine later. While it was lighter than the F-111B, it was still the largest and heaviest U.S. fighter to takeoff and land from an aircraft carrier. Its size was a consequence of the requirement to carry the large AWG-9 radar and AIM-54 Phoenix missiles, both from the F-111B, while exceeding the F-4's maneuverability. While the F-111B was armed only for the interceptor role, the Tomcat incorporated an internal M61 Vulcan cannon, provisions for Sidewinder and Sparrow air-to air missiles, and provisions for bombs. Basically, the Navy did not see themselves operating a fleet air defense fighter that was, in all essence, a converted Air Force strike bomber. While the F-111B did not reach service, land-based, non-fighter F-111 variants were in service with the U.S. Air Force for many years, and with the Royal Australian Air Force until 2010.

== Design ==
The F-111B was an all-weather interceptor aircraft intended to defend U.S. Navy carrier battle groups against bombers and anti-ship missiles. The F-111 features variable geometry wings, an internal weapons bay and a cockpit with side by side seating. The cockpit is part of an escape crew capsule. The wing sweep varies between 16 degrees and 72.5 degrees (full forward to full sweep). The airframe consisted mostly of aluminum alloys with steel, titanium and other materials also used. The fuselage is a semi-monocoque structure with stiffened panels and honeycomb sandwich panels for skin. The F-111B was powered by two Pratt & Whitney TF30 afterburning turbofan engines and included the AN/AWG-9 radar system for controlling the AIM-54 Phoenix air-to-air missiles. Poor visibility over the nose made the aircraft more difficult to handle for carrier operations.

The F-111 offered a platform with the range, payload, and Mach-2 performance to intercept targets quickly, but with swing wings and turbofan engines, it could also loiter on station for long periods. The F-111B would carry six AIM-54 Phoenix missiles, its main armament. Four of the Phoenix missiles mounted on wing pylons and two in the weapons bay. The missile pylons added significant drag when used.

== Operational history ==
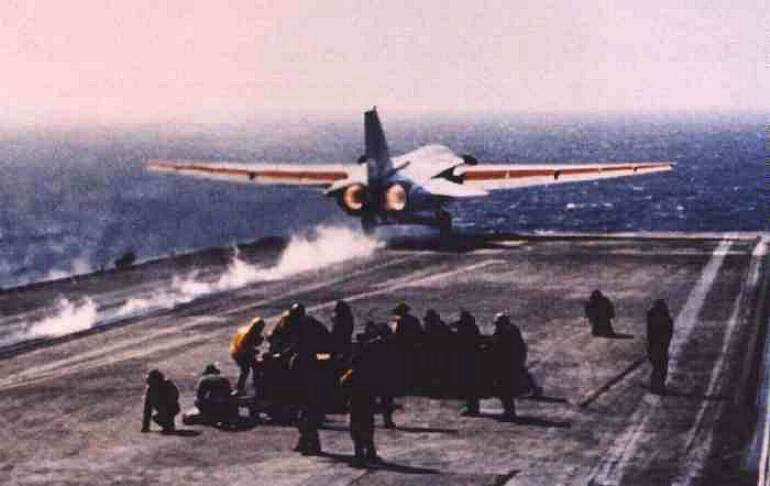
F-111B, BuNo 151974, being launched from USS Coral Sea in July 1968. It was the only F-111B to perform carrier operational trials.

=== Flight testing ===
Flight tests on the F-111B continued at NAS Point Mugu, California and NAWS China Lake, California even after the program had been terminated. In July 1968, the pre-production F-111B Bureau Number 151974, was used for carrier trials aboard USS Coral Sea. The evaluation was completed without issue.

Hughes continued Phoenix missile system development with four F-111Bs. In all, two F-111Bs were lost in crashes and a third seriously damaged. The F-111B's last flight was with 151792 from California to New Jersey in mid-1971. The seven F-111Bs flew 1,748 hours over 1,173 flights.

== Variants ==
F-111B numbers 1 to 3 were initial prototypes; and No. 4 and 5 were prototypes with lightened airframes. No. 6 and 7 had lightened airframes and improved TF30-P-12 engines and were built to near production standard. These were also approximately 2 feet (0.6 metres) longer due to an added section between the cockpit and radome. The first five aircraft included Triple Plow I intakes. The last two had Triple Plow II intakes. The first three B-models were fitted with ejection seats and the remainder included the escape crew capsule.

List of F-111Bs
Number	Serial number	Description	Location or fate
1	151970	Prototype with heavy airframe, TF30-P-3 engines	After flight test use was scrapped in December 1969.
2	151971	Prototype with heavy airframe, TF30-P-3 engines	Used for Hughes missile testing. Lost in a crash on 11 September 1968.
3	151972	Prototype with heavy airframe, TF30-P-3 engines	Was damaged and retired. Was used for jet blast testing at NATF, NAES Lakehurst, NJ and was probably scrapped there.
4	151973	Prototype with lightened airframe, TF30-P-3 engines	Destroyed in double engine failure crash on 21 April 1967.
5	151974	Prototype with lightened airframe, TF30-P-3 engines	Crash landed at NAS Point Mugu, CA in October 1968. Was dismantled at NAS Moffett Field, CA in 1970.
6	152714	Pre-production version, TF30-P-12 engines	Used for Hughes missile tests. Retired in 1969. Removed from inventory in 1971 and used for parts. Was photographed in 2008 in a Mojave, California scrapyard. Now sold as aircraft skin tags by the brand TransportTags.
7	152715	Pre-production version, TF30-P-12 engines	Retired and stored at NAWS China Lake, CA (awaiting restoration).

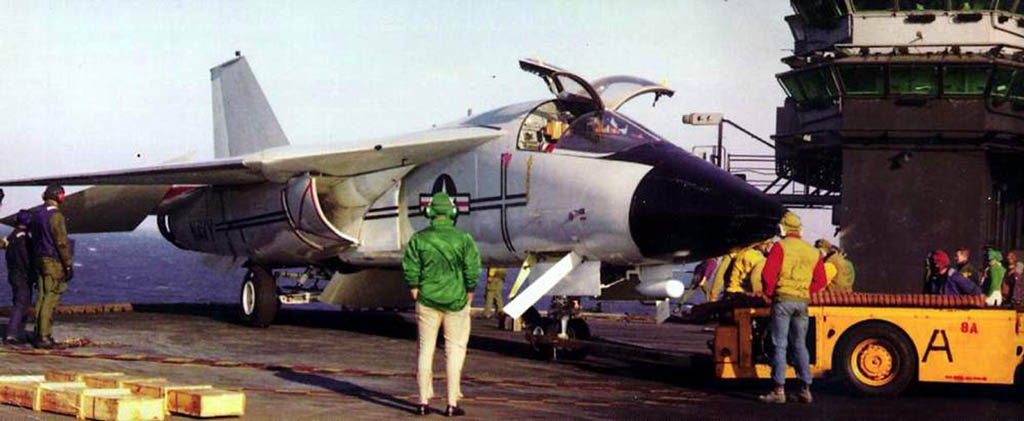
F-111B, BuNo 151974, on USS Coral Sea in July 1968. It crash-landed at NAS Point Mugu, California on 11 October 1968 and was subsequently scrapped.

== Operators ==
United States

- United States Navy

== Specifications (F-111B pre-production) ==
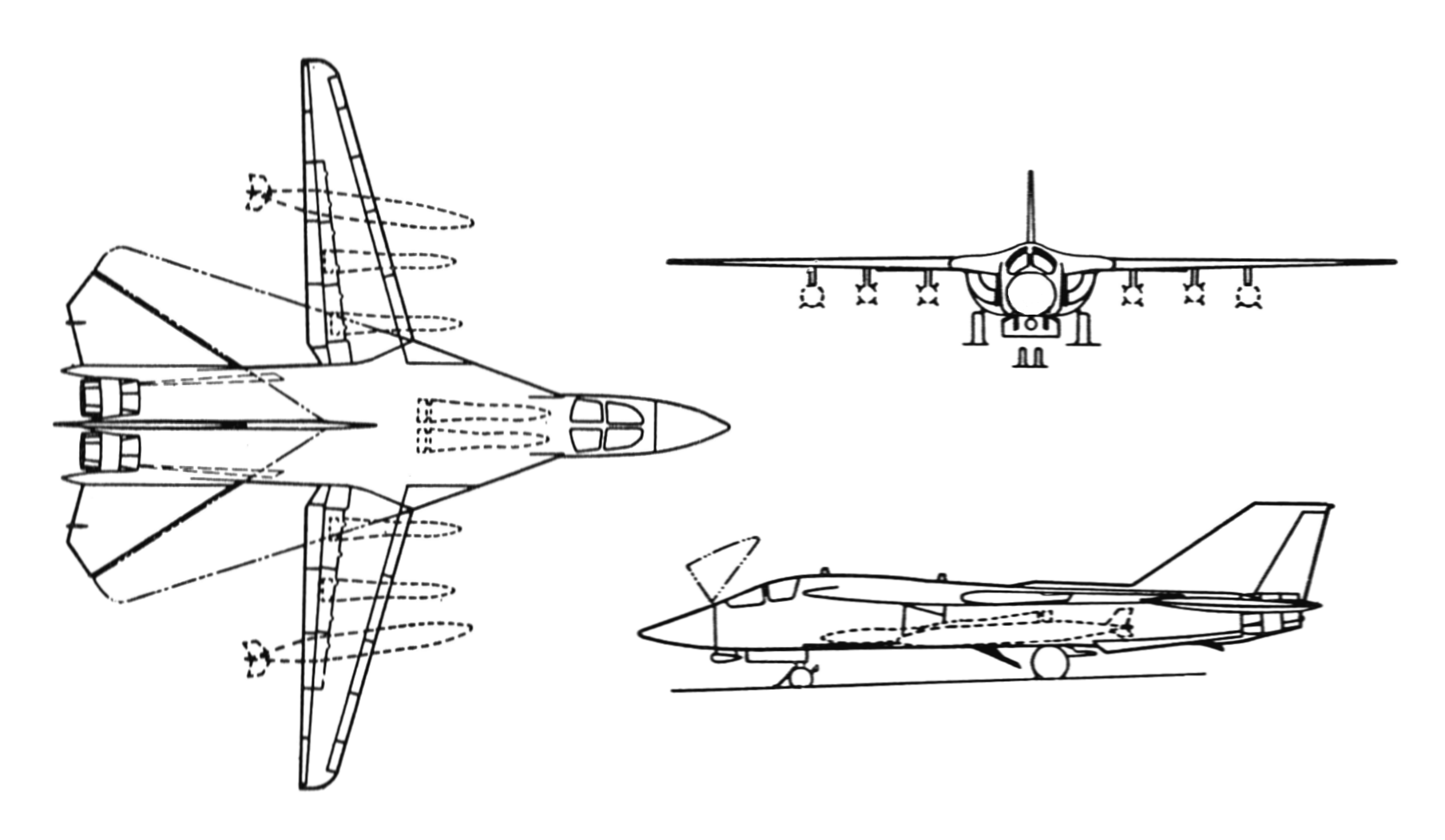

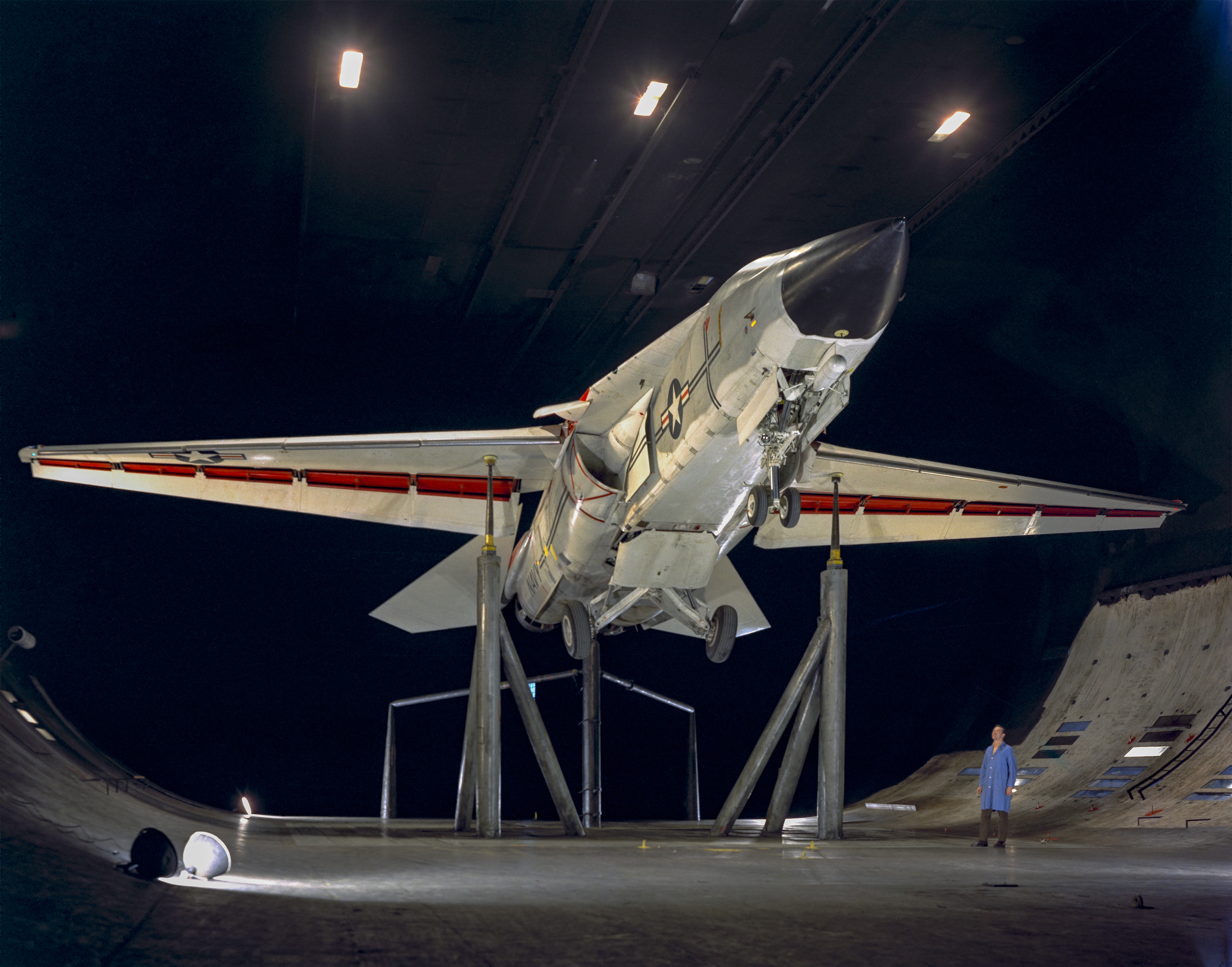
F-111B, BuNo 151974, at NAS Moffett Field, California during full-scale wind tunnel flight control tests

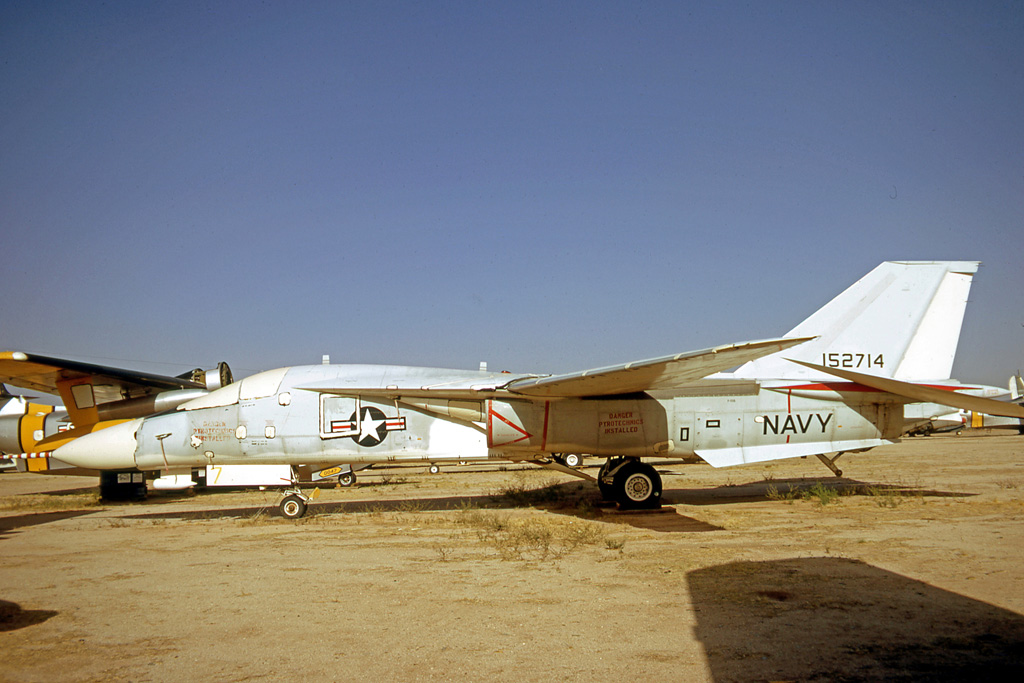
The first pre-production F-111B 152714 in storage at Davis Monthan AFB in 1971

For pre-production aircraft #6 & #7:

Data from Thomason, Miller, Logan

General characteristics

- Crew: 2 (pilot and weapons system operator)
- Length: 68 ft 10 in (20.98 m)
- Height: 15 ft 9 in (4.80 m)
- Airfoil: NACA 64-210.68 root, NACA 64-209.80 tip
- Empty weight: 46,100 lb (20,910 kg)
- Gross weight: 79,000 lb (35,800 kg)
- Max takeoff weight: 88,000 lb (39,900 kg)
- Wing span:
  - Spread: 70 ft (21.3 m)
  - Swept: 33 ft 11 in (10.34 m)
- Wing area:
  - Spread: 655.5 ft^{2} (60.9 m^{2})
  - Swept: 550 ft^{2} (51.1 m^{2})
- Powerplant: 2 × Pratt & Whitney TF30-P-12 turbofans, 10,750 lbf (47.8 kN) thrust each dry, 20,250 lbf (90.1 kN) with afterburner

Performance

- Maximum speed: 1,650 mph (2,655 km/h, 1,430 kn)
- Maximum speed: Mach 2.5
- Range: 2,100 mi (3,390 km, 1,830 nmi) ; with 6 AIM-54 missiles and 23,000 lb fuel internal
- Ferry range: 3,200 mi (5,150 km, 2,780 nmi) ; with 2 x 450 gal external tanks
- Service ceiling: 65,000 ft (19,800 m)
- Rate of climb: 21,300 ft/min (108 m/s)
- Thrust/weight: 0.47
- Wing loading:
  - Spread: 120 lb/ft^{2} (586 kg/m^{2})
  - Swept: 144 lb/ft^{2} (703 kg/m^{2})

Armament

- Guns: 1× M61 Vulcan 20 mm (0.787 in) Gatling cannon (seldom fitted)
- Hardpoints: 6 underwing pylons for ordnance and external fuel tanks
- Missiles: 6 × AIM-54 Phoenix long range air-air missiles (four under wings, two in weapons bay)

Avionics

- AN/AWG-9 Pulse-Doppler radar

== See also ==
Related development

- General Dynamics F-111 Aardvark
- General Dynamics–Grumman EF-111A Raven
- General Dynamics–Boeing AFTI/F-111A Aardvark
- General Dynamics F-111C
- General Dynamics F-111K

Aircraft of comparable role, configuration, and era

- Dassault Mirage G
- Grumman F-14 Tomcat
- Lavochkin La-250
- North American NR-349
- Operational Requirement F.155 (UK)
- Panavia Tornado ADV

Related lists

- List of bomber aircraft
- List of military aircraft of the United States
