= Forest Eleven =

International ecological coalition

Forest Eleven (F-11) is a group of tropical rainforest countries that found together in 2007 to defend their interests in the UNFCCC climate change negotiations. It initially consisted of the eleven members Brazil, Cameroon, Colombia, Congo (Brazzaville), DR Congo, Costa Rica, Gabon, Indonesia, Malaysia, Papua New Guinea and Peru. In 2010 Guatemala, Guyana and Suriname joined the group.

== External resources ==
- http://www.forest-eleven.dephut.go.id/ Official homepage of the group (hosted by Indonesia)
