= General Dynamics–Boeing AFTI/F-111A Aardvark =

American research aircraft

AFTI/F-111A Aardvark
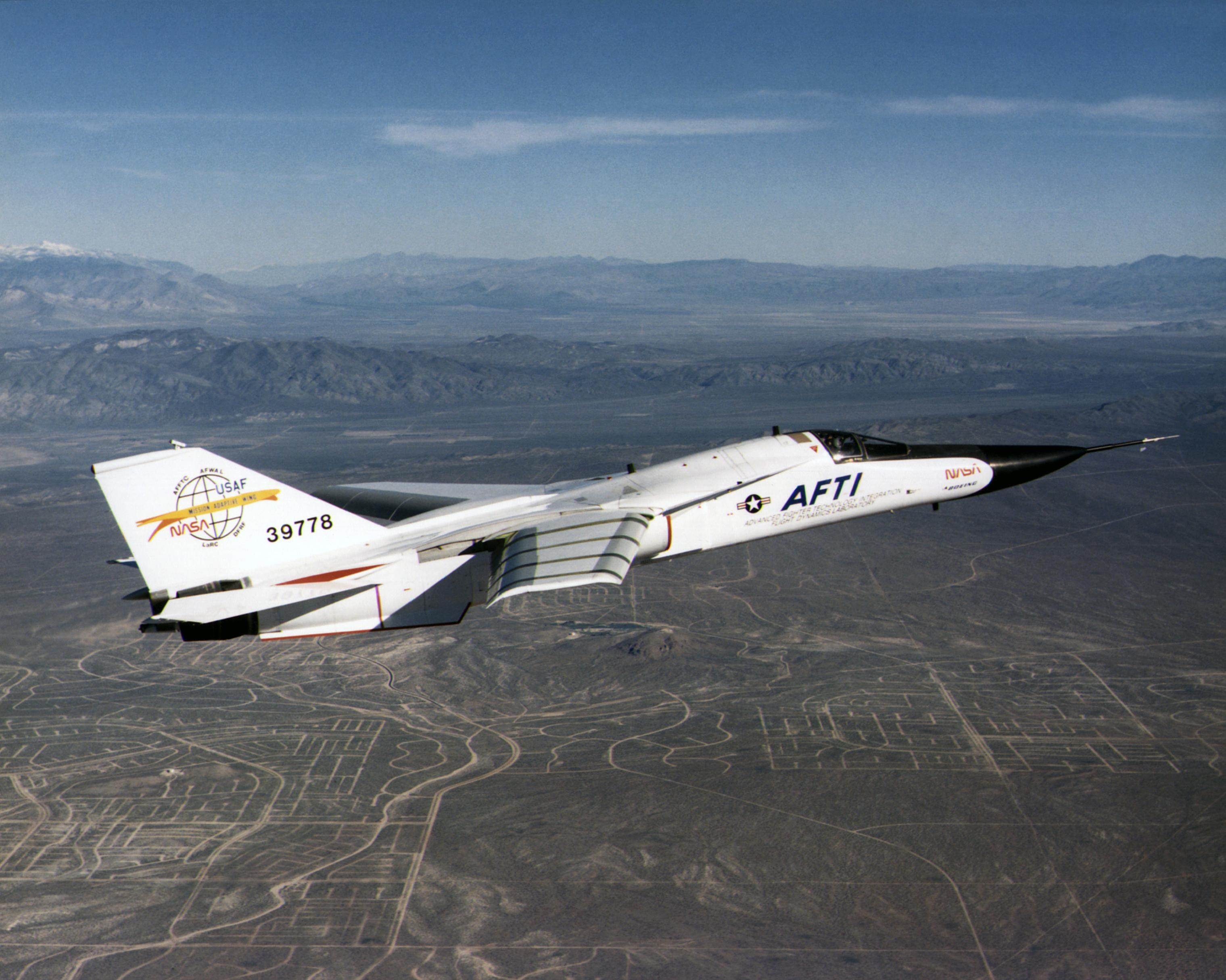
- AFTI/F-111A Aardvark in flight

General information
- Type: Research aircraft
- National origin: United States
- Manufacturer: General Dynamics/Boeing
- Status: In storage
- Primary user: NASA
- Number built: 1 (converted from F-111A)

History
- Introduction date: 1985
- First flight: 18 November 1985
- Retired: 1988
- Developed from: General Dynamics F-111 Aardvark

The General Dynamics–Boeing AFTI/F-111A Aardvark is a research aircraft modified from a General Dynamics F-111 Aardvark to test a Boeing-built supercritical mission adaptive wing (MAW). This MAW, in contrast to standard control surfaces, could smoothly change the shape of its airfoil in flight.

== Development ==
The AFTI/F-111A was part of the Advanced Fighter Technology Integration (AFTI) Program by the United States Air Force Flight Dynamics Laboratory and NASA, which was an extension of the earlier transonic aircraft technology (TACT) program to install a supercritical wing onto an F-111. Unlike the TACT program, AFTI utilized a mission adaptive wing, which, instead of standard control surfaces, could smoothly change the shape of its airfoil in flight. The concept was inspired by birds, which change the shape of their wings to adapt to new flight conditions.

By late 1981, Boeing had built a full-scale wing section and had received the variable-sweep actuator boxes from an F-111. The new wings were installed on the 13th service test F-111A (serial number 63-9778), which had previously been used in the TACT program. In November 1983, the systems for the MAW was powered up for the first time, revealing problems that delayed the program by five months.

The MAW of the AFTI/F-111A had four automatic flight modes:

- Maneuver camber control, which adjusted the camber of the wings for maximum aerodynamic efficiency.
- Cruise camber control, which adjusted the wings for maximum speed at any altitude and engine power.
- Maneuver load control, which adjusted the wings for maximum aircraft load factor.
- Maneuver enhancement alleviation, to cancel out the effects of gusts on the aircraft.

== Testing ==
The first flight of the AFTI/F-111A took place on 18 November 1985. A total of 59 flights were conducted between 1985 and 1988, resulting in satisfactory results from the four flight modes during testing and showing a significant reduction in drag. Additionally, none of the aircraft's 46 rotary actuators failed during testing, however, its 16 power drive units (PDU) required 37 component or complete replacements.

As of April 2023, the aircraft used in the TACT and AFTI programs is in storage at the Air Force Flight Test Museum at Edwards AFB.

== Specifications ==
Data from Standard F-111A, Mission Adaptive Wing

General characteristics

- Crew: 2
- Length: 75 ft 6.5 in (23.03 m)
- Wingspan: 59.07 ft (18.00 m)
- Height: 17 ft 0.5 in (5.19 m)
- Wing area: 623.2 sq ft (57.90 m^{2}) spread, 605.8 sq ft (56.28 m^{2}) swept
- Airfoil: Boeing Advanced Transonic Airfoil
- Powerplant: 2 × Pratt & Whitney TF30-P-3 turbofan engines, 12,000 lbf (53 kN) thrust each dry, 18,500 lbf (82 kN) with afterburner

Performance

== See also ==
- Aeroelasticity

Related development

- General Dynamics–Grumman F-111B
- General Dynamics F-111C
- General Dynamics–Grumman EF-111A Raven
- General Dynamics F-111K
- General Dynamics AFTI/F-16A

Aircraft of comparable role, configuration, and era

- Boeing X-53 Active Aeroelastic Wing
