= General Dynamics F-111K =

British combat aircraft project (1965–1968)

F-111K
- Artist's impression of F-111K

General information
- Type: Tactical Strike; Low-Level Interdiction; Reconnaissance
- National origin: United States
- Manufacturer: General Dynamics
- Status: Cancelled
- Primary user: Royal Air Force (Planned)
- Number built: 0 (2 incomplete)
- Serial: XV884 – XV887; XV902 – XV947

History
- Developed from: General Dynamics F-111 Aardvark

The General Dynamics F-111K was a planned variant of the General Dynamics F-111 Aardvark medium-range interdictor and tactical strike aircraft by General Dynamics, to meet a Royal Air Force requirement for such an aircraft.

The project was initiated in 1965 following the cancellation of the BAC TSR-2 strike aircraft. The aircraft was planned as a hybrid of several variants of the F-111 as a way of producing an aircraft for the specific needs of the United Kingdom. An RAF order for 50 aircraft, made in 1967, was cancelled a year later.

== Development ==
=== Background ===
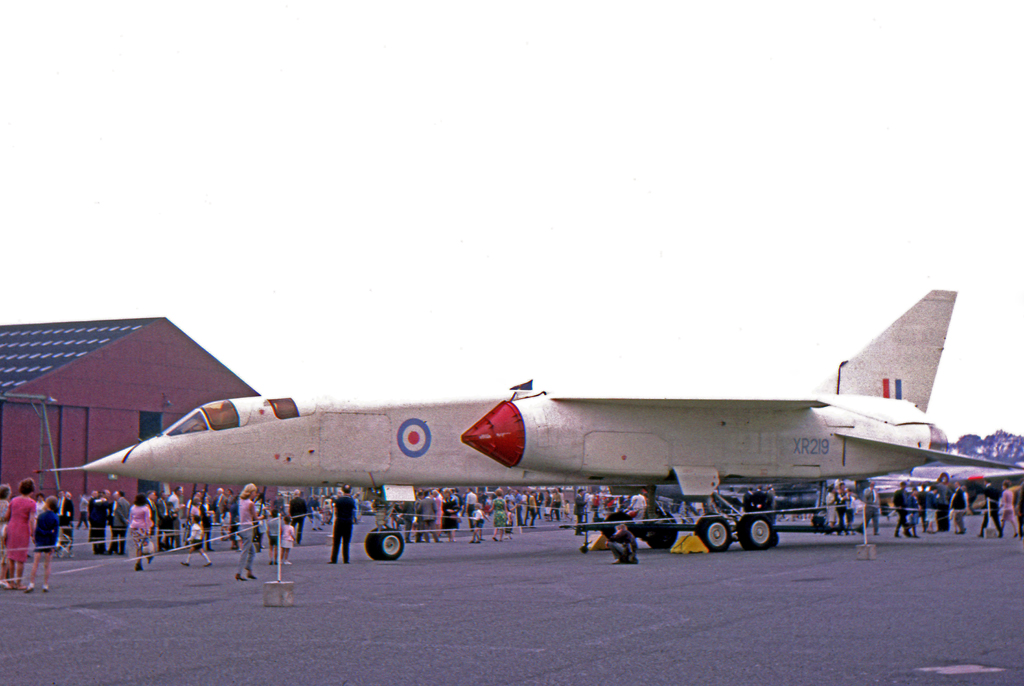
The BAC TSR-2 was intended to form the backbone of the RAF's tactical strike force

In the early 1960s, the British Aircraft Corporation was in the process of developing a new strike aircraft for the Royal Air Force to replace the English Electric Canberra. This aircraft, designated as "TSR-2" (Tactical Strike and Reconnaissance), had a large set of requirements listed by the government, and had led to TSR-2 becoming a hugely complex machine; it was intended that it be able to undertake both conventional and nuclear strike missions at high and low level, in all weathers, at supersonic speeds. As a consequence, the costs of the project began to increase, leading to it becoming the most expensive aviation project in British history, at a time when defence spending was being cut. This led to the RAF being asked to look for potential alternatives to TSR-2, in the event of it being cancelled.

At the same time, the Australian government was looking for a replacement for the Canberras operated by the Royal Australian Air Force (RAAF), and was investigating a number of options, including the TSR-2 and the General Dynamics F-111 then being developed for the US TFX Program. The versatility of the F-111 and uncertainty over the TSR-2 led, in 1963, to contracts for the RAAF-specific F-111C.

An incoming Labour government expressed its support for the TSR-2, although the RAF was asked to also evaluate the F-111 as a cheaper option. In April 1965, the TSR-2 was officially cancelled and the RAF again looked at the possibility of acquiring up to 110 F-111s.

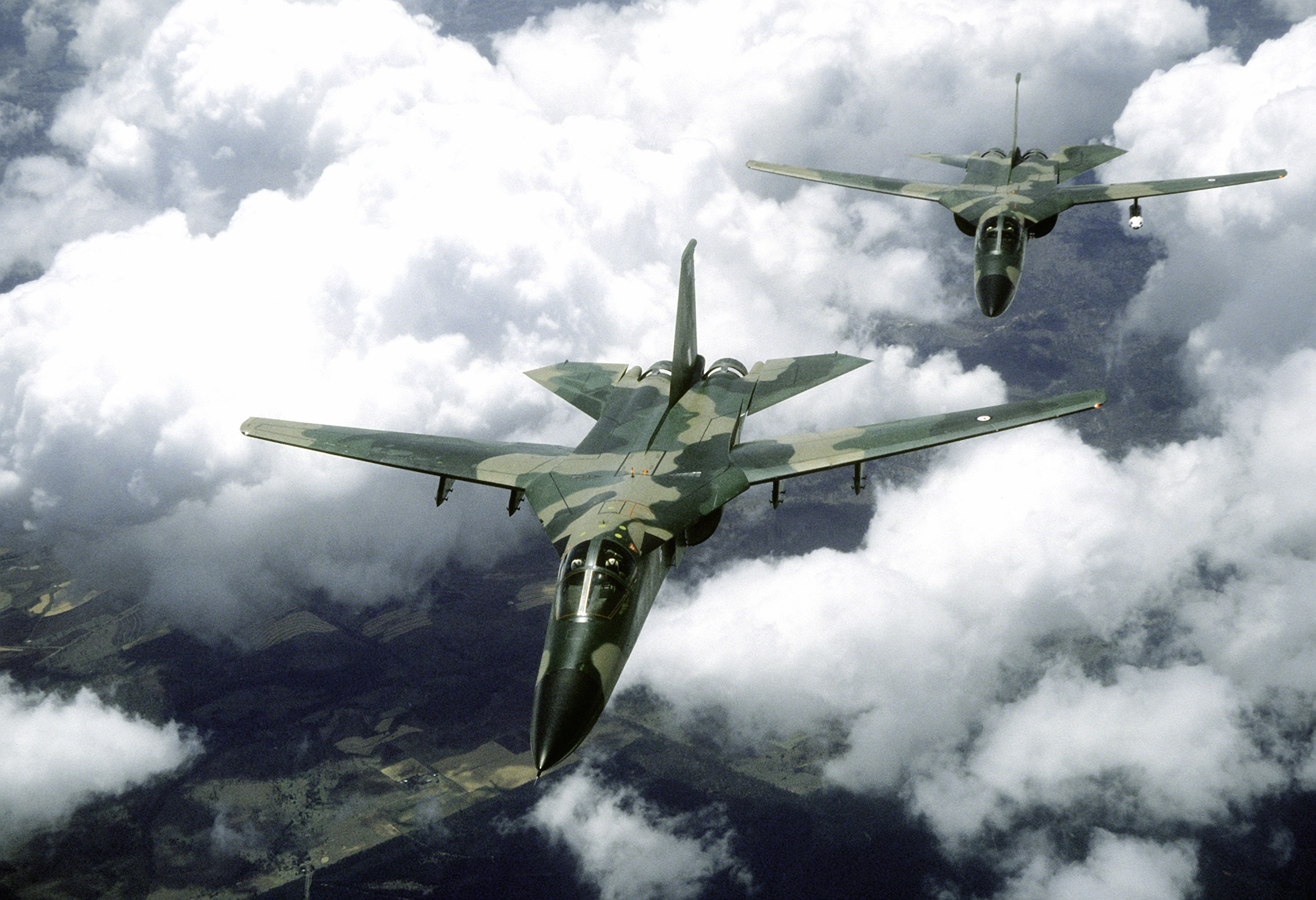
The RAAF selected the F-111C as its preferred option, a decision seen as being crucial to the cancellation of TSR-2 and the UK purchasing the F-111 instead.

No firm commitment was made to the F-111 until the publication of the 1966 Defence White Paper, although it was the government's preferred option. Following the publication of the defence review, it was announced that up to 50 F-111s would be procured for the RAF; like the Australian version, these would be highly adapted to suit the unique set of British requirements. The intention was to form an initial four operational squadrons, plus an Operational Conversion Unit, with two stationed in the UK and two forming part of the UK's forces East of Suez. The intention was that long-range, land based F-111s would be used to replace the strike capability of the CVA-01 aircraft carriers that were cancelled in the White Paper. Although there was no public announcement as to specific squadrons that would receive the F-111, a document from early 1966 by the AOC-in-C of Bomber Command, Air Chief Marshal Sir Wallace Kyle, indicated that 12 Squadron (then a Vulcan squadron assigned to the strategic nuclear role), together with the inactive 7 (previously Valiant), 15 (Victor) and 40 (Canberra) Squadrons, would receive the aircraft upon their delivery.

In April 1966, a firm order was placed for 10 F-111s for the RAF, with options for another 40, covering the standard F-111K models and a number of dual-control TF-111K trainers, with the purchase price set around £2.1m ($5.95m) per unit (1965 prices). This was intended to show a significant reduction in cost when compared with the development and estimated production costs of TSR-2. At the same time, a pair of Victor squadrons had been moved out of RAF Honington, which was earmarked for conversion to accommodate the F-111 force. However, at the same time the actual cost of F-111 production had increased; in April 1967, when the RAF's 40 additional aircraft were ordered, the per unit cost of the F-111C for the RAAF was US$9m. This eventually led to an admission from the British government that the cost would increase from the initial figure set out – in 1967, the then Secretary of State for Defence, Denis Healey, stated that adjusting for inflation was taken into account, which would add approximately 2.5% to the cost of each aircraft. This did not include the cost of installing the British adaptations. The total estimated cost per unit by the time the last aircraft was due to be delivered in 1970 was approximately £2.7m. Despite this, the government still maintained that the F-111 programme (combined with the proposed AFVG aircraft) would be cheaper than TSR-2 to the tune of approximately £700m.

=== Cancellation ===
The first two F-111K airframes were in an advanced state of assembly when the project was cancelled in 1968

The first two aircraft began assembly in July 1967, and were issued with the serial numbers XV884 and XV885. These were intended as development aircraft, to undertake airframe, avionics and weapons testing prior to them being refurbished as operational units. At the same time, the remainder of the planned 50 strong fleet were allocated serials from XV886-887 (TF-111K) and XV902-947 (F-111K). The first two airframes were in the final stages of assembly at General Dynamics' plant at Fort Worth, Texas in early 1968 when the Government then issued a new policy that would see the majority of British forces stationed East of Suez withdrawn by 1971. At the same time it also decided to cancel the F-111K procurement. The devaluation of sterling in 1967 had led to the per unit cost rising to approximately £3m. Additionally, the production schedules were slipping; while the RAAF had its first F-111 delivered in 1968, official acceptance of the type into service did not occur until 1973 due to structural and development problems (which led to the RAAF having to lease 24 F-4 Phantoms as an interim measure). All of the components that had been assembled for the production of the main F-111K fleet that shared commonality were diverted to the FB-111A program, while the two aircraft under construction were re-designated as YF-111As with the intention that they be used as test aircraft in the F-111A program. Ultimately however, the two F-111Ks were never operated as test aircraft – in July 1968, almost exactly a year after the first airframe began construction, the US Air Force decided not to take them over, and General Dynamics were ordered to use them for component recovery.

=== Replacement ===
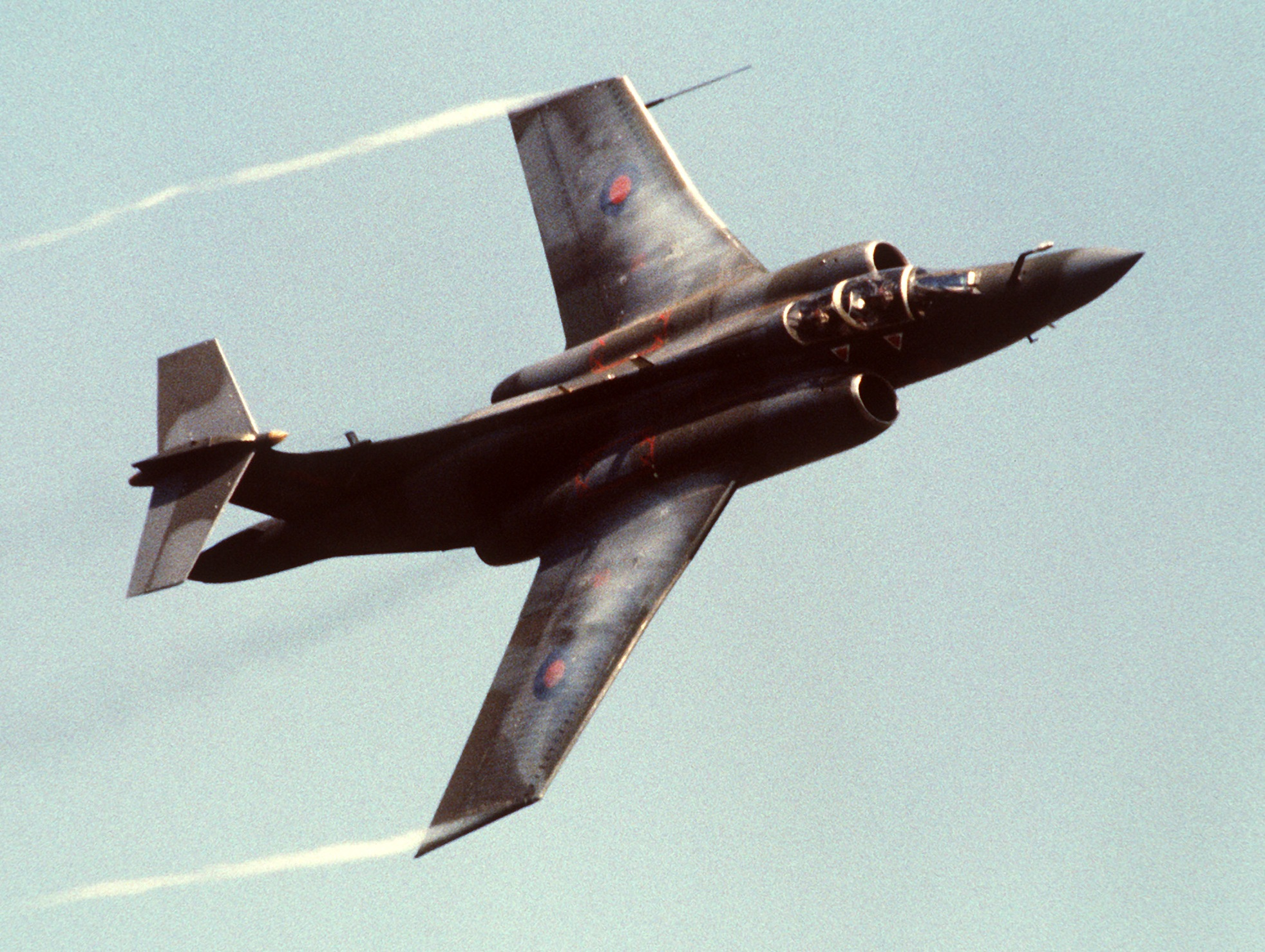
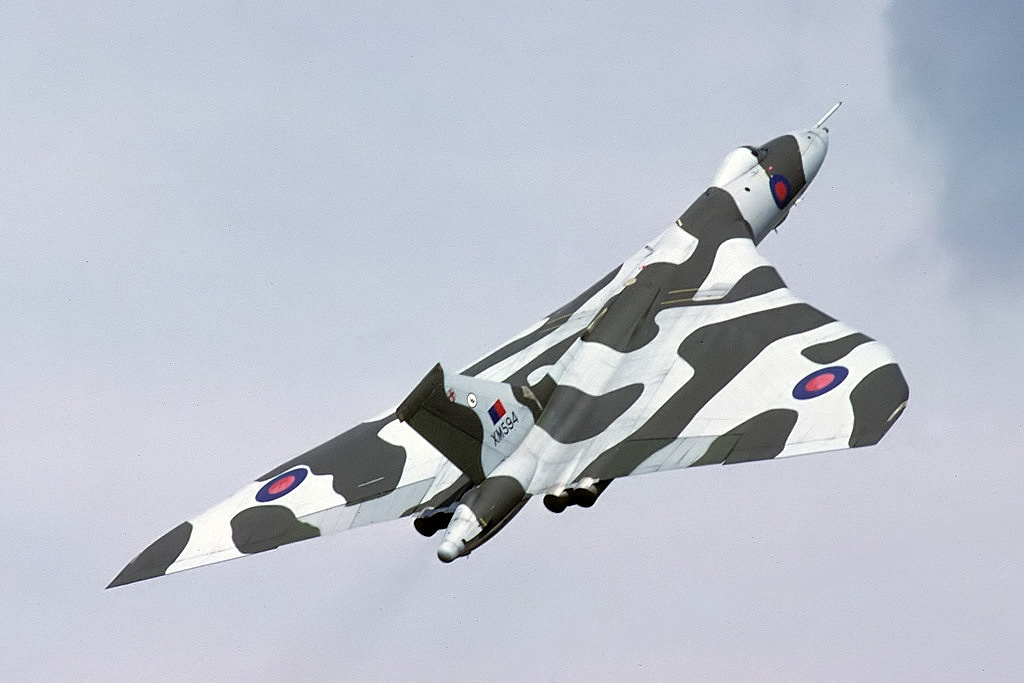
To replace the cancelled F-111, 26 new Buccaneers (left) were purchased for the RAF, while the Vulcan (right) was moved from its strategic role to long range interdiction

The cancellation of the F-111K still left a requirement for a strike aircraft to replace the Canberra, so the government ordered 26 new Blackburn Buccaneer aircraft for the RAF to operate alongside ex-Fleet Air Arm Buccaneers that were being moved to the RAF following the phased withdrawal of fixed wing carrier aviation in the Royal Navy – this was despite the Buccaneer having been rejected as a contender for the original RAF requirement that had led first to the selection and cancellation of TSR-2, and subsequently the F-111K. No. 12 Squadron, one of the units that had been proposed to operate the F-111, became operational as the first RAF Buccaneer squadron at RAF Honington in 1969. With responsibility for the UK's nuclear deterrent passing to the Royal Navy in 1969, Vulcans were transferred from the strategic bomber role to the long range air interdiction role that would have been fulfilled by the F-111.

The ending of the F-111 procurement, combined with the cancellation of the AFVG project, led to Britain eventually joining the multi-national working group to develop the "Multi-Role Combat Aircraft" in 1968; this led to the formation of Panavia and the ultimate development of the Tornado, an aircraft that assumed the roles of low-level strike and long range interdiction planned for the F-111.

== Design ==
F-111K cutaway diagram

The F-111K was to be based around the airframe of the original F-111A version built for the U.S. Air Force, but was to feature a number of alterations and adaptations. Structurally, the aircraft would be similar to F-111A with the heavy duty undercarriage from the strategic bomber version. This allowed for a greater gross weight to be designed into the aircraft. The other major design change from the F-111A was in its avionics, with the design calling for the Mark II package developed for the F-111D version. This featured a new inertial navigation and attack system, incorporating the Rockwell International AN/APQ-130 attack radar, an IBM on-board computer, the Marconi AN/APN-189 doppler navigation radar and the Sperry Corporation AN/APQ-128 terrain following radar. The plan was then to pair this avionics package with British designed and developed mission systems, of which the main elements were the reconnaissance capability and weapon carriage. The F-111K was to feature a revised weapons bay, containing a new removable centreline weapons pylon, which was beneficial given the design of the underwing pylons – the F-111 had four stations under each wing, but only the inner pair were designed to pivot, meaning that the outer pair could not be used with the wings in full sweepback mode. All of the weapon pylons featured British designed ejector rack units. Unlike the U.S. versions, the aircraft was given provision for a pallet inside the weapons bay that would feature a British designed reconnaissance system, with three camera windows located next to the nosewheel undercarriage. The aircraft was designed with an aerial refuelling probe compatible with the "probe and drogue" system used by the RAF, similar to the one fitted to the F-111B, although mounted differently.

== Specifications (F-111K) ==
An orthographically projected diagram of the F-111

Data from Wilson and Pittaway

General characteristics

- Crew: 2 (pilot and weapons system operator)
- Length: 22.4 m (73 ft 0 in)
- Height: 5.22 m (17 ft 1 in)
- Wingspan:
  - Spread: 19.2 m (63.0 ft)
  - Swept: 9.75 m (32 ft)
- Wingarea:
  - Spread: 61.07 m² (657.4 ft^{2})
  - Swept: 48.77 m² (525 ft^{2})
- Powerplant: 2 × Pratt & Whitney TF30-P-100 turbofans

Performance

- Maximum speed: Mach 2.5

Armament

- Hardpoints: 9 in total (8 × under-wing, 1 × underfuselage in weapons bay)

Avionics

- Rockwell AN/APQ-130 attack radar
- Sperry AN/APQ-128 J-Band terrain following radar
- Marconi AN/APN-189 Doppler navigation radar

== See also ==
Related development

- General Dynamics F-111 Aardvark
- General Dynamics–Grumman F-111B
- General Dynamics–Grumman EF-111A Raven
- General Dynamics–Boeing AFTI/F-111A Aardvark
- General Dynamics F-111C

Aircraft of comparable role, configuration, and era

- BAC TSR-2
- Blackburn Buccaneer
- Panavia Tornado
- Sukhoi Su-24

Related lists

- List of bomber aircraft
- List of aircraft of the Royal Air Force

== Bibliography ==
- Gardner, Charles (1981). British Aircraft Corporation: A History. London: BT Batsford. ISBN 0-7134-3815-0.
- Logan, Don (1998). General Dynamics F-111 Aardvark. Atglen, PA: Schiffer. ISBN 0-7643-0587-5.
