= General Dynamics F-111C =

Military interdictor and tactical strike aircraft

F-111C
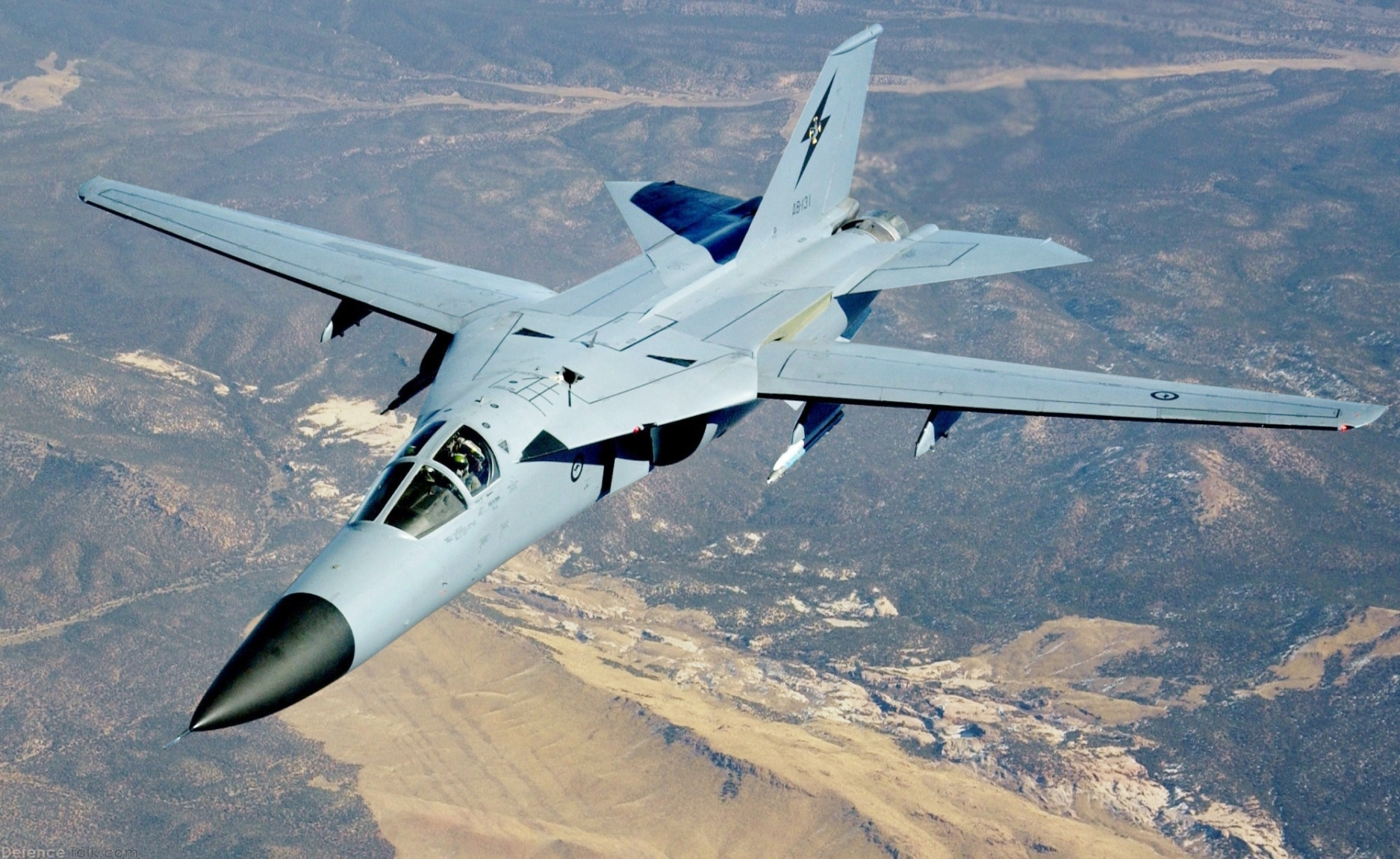
- An F-111C of the Royal Australian Air Force in 2006

General information
- Type: Fighter-bomber and reconnaissance aircraft
- National origin: United States
- Manufacturer: General Dynamics
- Status: Retired
- Primary user: Royal Australian Air Force
- Number built: 28

History
- Introduction date: 1973
- First flight: July 1968
- Retired: 3 December 2010
- Developed from: General Dynamics F-111 Aardvark
- Variant: General Dynamics F-111K

The General Dynamics F-111C (nicknamed the "Pig") is a variant of the F-111 Aardvark medium-range interdictor and tactical strike aircraft, developed by General Dynamics to meet Australian requirements. The design was based on the F-111A model but included longer wings and strengthened undercarriage. The Australian government ordered 24 F-111Cs to equip the Royal Australian Air Force (RAAF) in 1963, but the aircraft were not delivered until 1973 because of long-running technical problems. During 1979 and 1980 four of these aircraft were converted to the RF-111C reconnaissance variant. Four ex–United States Air Force (USAF) F-111As were purchased by Australia and converted to F-111C standard in 1982 to replace F-111Cs destroyed during accidents. Australia also operated 15 F-111Gs between 1993 and 2007, mainly for conversion training. In Australian military and aviation circles, the F-111 Aardvark was affectionately known as the "Pig", due to its long snout and terrain-following ability. (Note: The "Pig" nickname may also derive from the word aardvark, originating as an archaric Afrikaans term, which translates into English as "Earth Pig".)

The F-111Cs gave the RAAF a powerful strike capability but were never used in combat. The aircraft went through modernization programs in the 1980s and 1990s, and the RAAF acquired improved weapons to maintain their ability to penetrate hostile airspace. Despite this, by the 2000s the F-111Cs were becoming outdated and expensive to maintain, leading to a decision to retire them in 2010 rather than 2020 as originally planned. The F-111s were replaced by 24 Boeing F/A-18F Super Hornets, who were later supplemented with F-35 Lightning IIs in the early 2020s.

== Development ==
=== Background ===
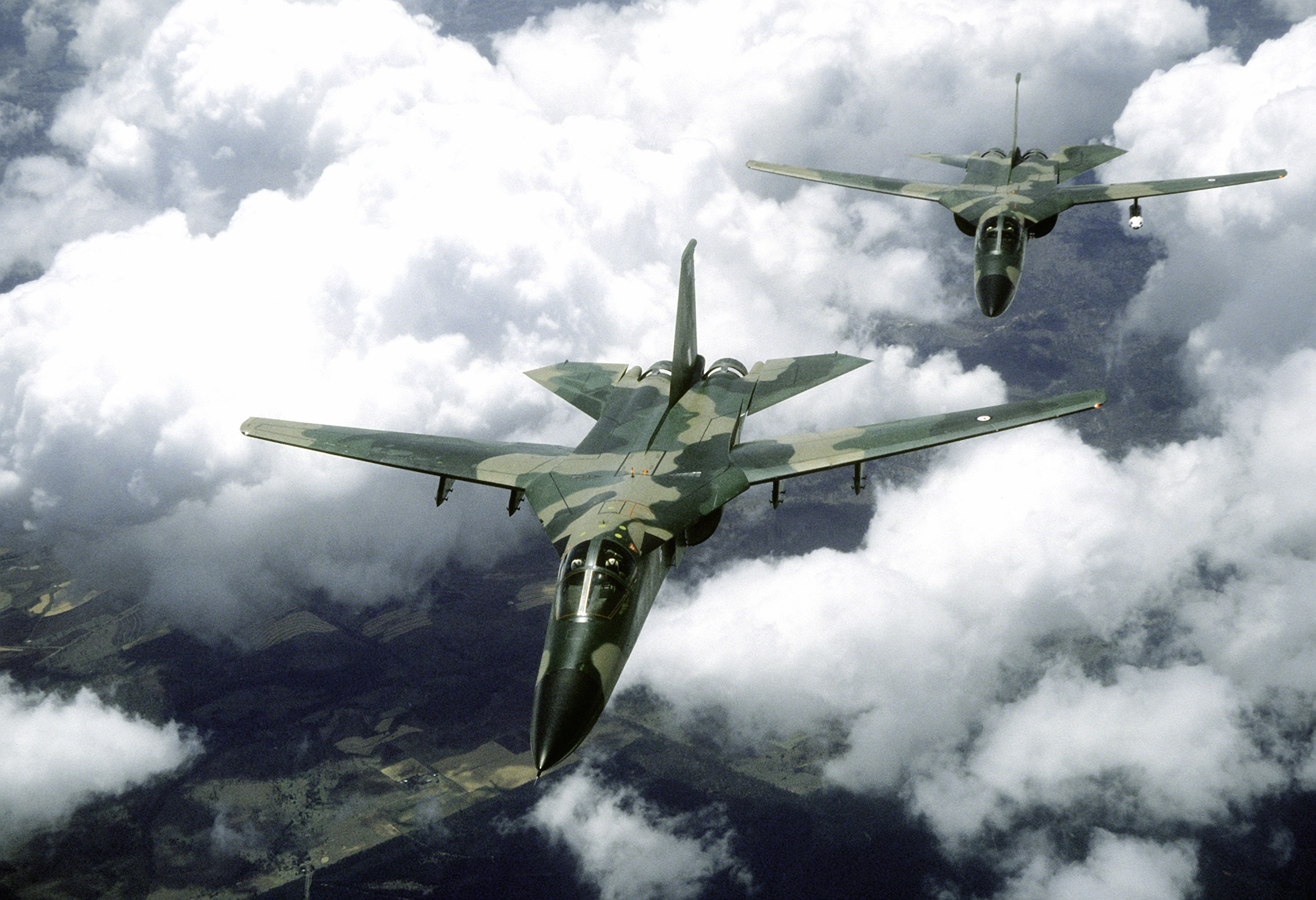
Two RAAF F-111 aircraft during Exercise Kangaroo '81

In June 1960, the United States Air Force (USAF) issued a requirement for an F-105 Thunderchief replacement. The U.S. Navy began a program to develop a new air defense fighter for use on its large aircraft carriers. On 14 February 1961, newly appointed United States Secretary of Defense Robert McNamara formally directed that the services study the development of a single aircraft that would satisfy both requirements. The Tactical Fighter Experimental (TFX) requirements were based largely on the Air Force's needs. A request for proposals (RFP) for the TFX was provided to industry in October 1961. After four rounds of proposals, General Dynamics (GD) was selected over Boeing; GD signed the TFX contract in December 1962.

The USAF F-111A and Navy F-111B variants used the same airframe structural components and TF30-P-1 turbofan engines. They featured side-by-side crew seating in an escape capsule, as required by the Navy. Because of conflict between the Air Force and Navy over whose requirements had precedence, McNamara intervened in 1961, declaring that the Air Force desires would override suggestions by the Navy. The F-111A variant first flew on 21 December 1964 from Carswell AFB, Texas. It was followed by the F-111B, which first flew on 18 May 1965.

As F-111 development continued, stall issues arose in certain parts of the flight regime; these were addressed by modifying the engine inlet in 1965–66, ending with the "Triple Plow I" and "Triple Plow II" designs. The F-111B was cancelled by the Navy in 1968 due to weight and performance deficiencies. The improved F-111E, F-111D, F-111F models were subsequently developed for the USAF. The FB-111A strategic bomber and the EF-111 electronic warfare versions were also later developed for the USAF. Production ended in 1976, with a total of 563 F-111s of all variants built, well below the prediction of 1,500.

=== Replacing the Canberra ===
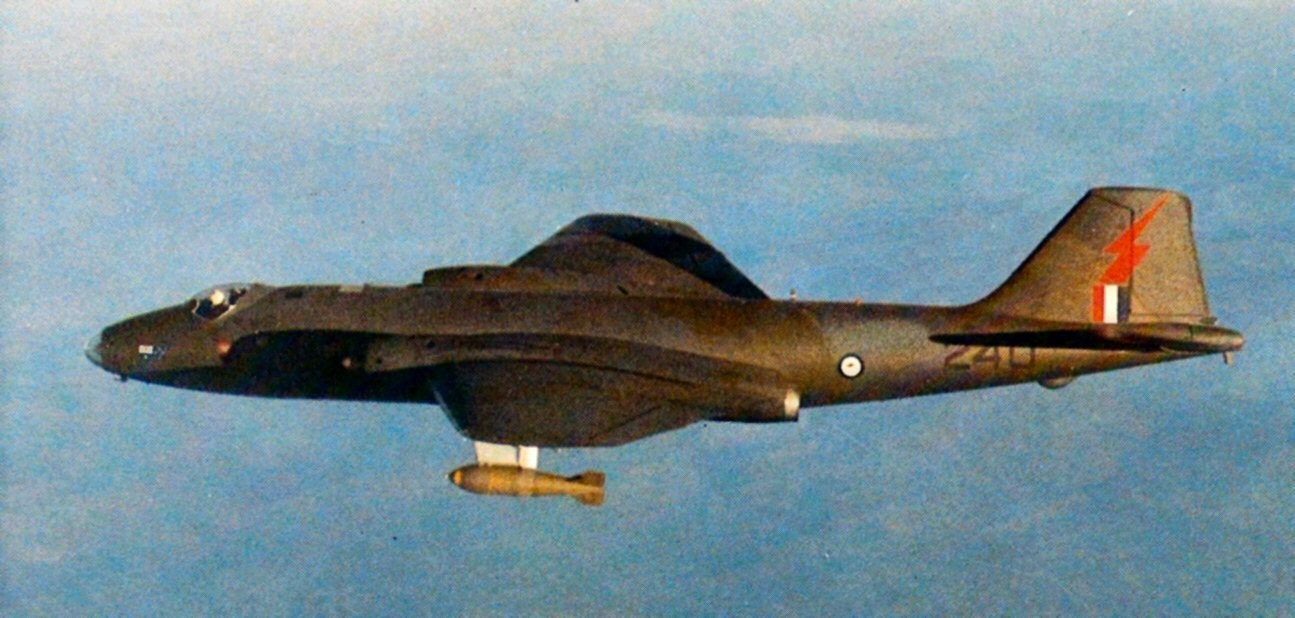
RAAF Canberra Mk.20 of No. 2 Squadron during a strike out of Phan Rang Air Base, Vietnam, March 1970

The Menzies government first publicly discussed the need for replacing the English Electric Canberra in 1954, only a year after the RAAF began receiving the bomber. The non-supersonic Canberra lacked radar and electronic countermeasures, all disadvantages based on Korean War experience. The RAAF believed that it needed a new strategic bomber to fulfill the nation's obligations to the Commonwealth Strategic Reserve in Malaysia, ANZUS, and SEATO. Air Staff Requirement 36 that year mandated an all-weather attack aircraft by 1959 capable of delivering a variety of bombs and missiles. A study recommended one of the British V bombers, but Minister of Defence Frederick Shedden decided in 1956 that at £1 million each they were too expensive.

Air Marshal Valston Hancock, Chief of the Air Staff, stated in April 1960 that Australia needed a replacement for the Canberra. Although in mid-1962 the Menzies government again decided to not replace the Canberra, Indonesia's increasingly aggressive statements regarding Malaysia soon caused Australia to reevaluate the decision. The Sydney Morning Herald reported in October 1962 that the Indonesian Air Force's Soviet Tupolev Tu-16 bombers could reach Sydney or any other Australian city with a light bomb load, while the Canberras could not fly in all weather and had a range of 900 miles (1,400 km), insufficient to reach Jakarta. The opposition Labor Party, led by Arthur Calwell, used the report to criticize Menzies. The government denied that the Tu-16 could reach Sydney, but Minister for Air Frederick Osborne acknowledged that the Canberras were "the weakest link in our armory at the present moment". He stated, however, that the available foreign bombers were unsuitable for the RAAF. The American Boeing B-52 Stratofortress and Convair B-58 Hustler, for example, were too large for existing Australian runways. More suitable aircraft such as the British BAC TSR-2 and the American TFX (later the F-111) would soon be available, Osborne said.

=== Hancock study ===
In May 1963 Menzies announced an A£200 million increase in defense spending over the next five years, and proposed to send a team led by Hancock overseas to evaluate Canberra replacements. Early candidates were the French Dassault Mirage IV, the TSR-2, and the U.S. North American A-5 Vigilante, McDonnell Douglas F-4 Phantom II and the TFX. From June to August, Hancock's team visited France, Britain and the United States to evaluate the competitors, and determined that the TFX would be the aircraft best suited for the role. The Mirage IV had insufficient range and the A£108 million price was too expensive. The F-4 and the A-5 were immediately available, but the less expensive F-4 would need air-to-air refueling to reach Indonesia from Australia. The TSR-2 was behind schedule and over budget, was the most expensive at A£122 million for 24 aircraft, and British government support for the program was uncertain. While the TFX was also controversial in the United States, its promised performance specifications and per-aircraft cost were superior to that of the TSR-2. As he did not expect TFX to be available before 1970, however, Hancock recommended buying 36 A-5 aircraft for A£88 million to counteract the perceived imminent threat from Indonesia.

The Menzies government was reluctant to choose as interim replacement the A-5 or the F-4, which could not be deployed until 1966 and would cost A$120–180 million. (Note: The Australian dollar replaced the Australian pound on 14 February 1966 with the conversion rate of A$2 = A£1) Waiting for the TSR-2 or TFX in 1969 or 1970 seemed to pose great risk, but when considering Hancock's findings in September 1963 it wanted to be able to offer a substantial response to the Labor party's criticism of its defense strategy. The British and American governments competed on behalf of their nations' unbuilt bombers, as both believed that export sales would increase domestic support for the aircraft. The Menzies government viewed the British promise to deploy a squadron of V bombers in Australia for interim defense until the TSR-2 was ready as unacceptable for both technical and political reasons. Beyond its cost, the Royal Air Force had not ordered the TSR-2; the Chief of the Defence Staff Lord Louis Mountbatten, who opposed it, advised the Australians against buying the aircraft and the RAAF feared being the only customer.

=== Decision ===
The government determined that it did not need to go ahead with an immediate replacement for the Canberra and preferred Hancock's original choice of the TFX as a long-term solution, leading to the Menzies government's announcement on 24 October that it was ordering 24 F-111s for US$125 million, enough for two squadrons. The announcement came during the campaigning for the 1963 general election. Calwell's Labor party had on 22 October reiterated its pre-campaign promise that it would replace the Canberras as soon as it formed a government. The government's announcement, and the consequent improvement of its chances against Labor, likely also benefited the United States; the purchase helped rebut American critics of the TFX, and the Kennedy administration preferred Menzies' defense policies to the opposition's. The contract was signed the following year through the U.S. Department of Defense. The British government's cancellation of the TSR-2 in April 1965 showed that Australia's decision to not order it was correct.

=== Procurement, delays, and renaming ===
The U.S. offered two squadrons of Boeing B-47 Stratojets for free lease pending the delivery of the F-111; Australia declined the offer in June 1964—despite the aircraft having been demonstrated around the country just before the 1963 election as an interim Canberra replacement, likely another sign of the American preference for Menzies— because the B-47 did not offer significant improvements over the Canberra and, like the V bombers, would require longer runways.

The immensely complex and ambitious F-111 design and construction process forced the Australian government to quickly adopt sophisticated American procurement and project management methods. Although Australia originally planned to buy the American F-111A design, RAAF liaison officers requested country-specific changes such as a long-distance radio, Aeronautical Research Laboratories in Melbourne participated in an intake redesign and provided metal fatigue expertise, and an Australian test pilot evaluated the Australian version's longer wings and performance in tropical conditions. The differences from the F-111A caused it to be designated the F-111C in 1966.

=== Delivery ===
The first F-111C was officially delivered in 1968, finally giving Australia an aircraft that could fly to Jakarta, drop bombs, and return without refueling. (The RAAF only acquired air-to-air refueling for the F/A-18, possibly to avoid causing difficulties with other Asian countries by increasing the F-111C's already great range.) Training began in 1967, with RAAF personnel seeing terrain-following radar and other sophisticated equipment for the first time. However, development delays and structural problems delayed acceptance of aircraft by the RAAF until 1973. These issues were mainly to do with the wing attach points, and the redesign of the F-111 engine intakes. Completion of contractual requirements to the satisfaction of Australia also took time, damaging the morale of the hundreds of trained RAAF personnel who had little to do. The program costs, during 1963–1967, grew at an alarming rate; estimates by the USAF at the start of the program was placed at US$124.5 million, but by April 1967 had risen to $237.75 million. While the initial price of US$5.21 million per aircraft was capped at US$5.95 million, R&D, labor, and other costs were not. The rising price, three unexplained losses of USAF F-111As in Vietnam during their first month of deployment, and the British and U.S. Navy's orders' cancellations caused further controversy in Australia during 1968. By 1973, however, when the F-111A had accumulated 250,000 flight hours, it had the best safety record among contemporary aircraft, which presaged the F-111C's own excellent record.

Four aircraft were modified to RF-111C reconnaissance configuration during 1979–80, retaining their strike capability. The RF-111C carried a reconnaissance pack with four cameras and an infrared linescanner unit. Four ex-USAF F-111As were refitted to F-111C standard and delivered to Australia as attrition replacements in 1982. There F-111Cs were equipped to carry Pave Tack FLIR/laser pods in the mid-1980s. They underwent an extensive Avionics Upgrade Program through 1998. Under this program, the F-111C was upgraded to digital avionics. This included twin mission computers, modern digital databus, digital weapon management system, new AN/APQ-171 terrain-following radar, new AN/APQ-169 attack radar, and twin ring-laser gyro INS.

In late 2001, wing fatigue problems were discovered in one of the F-111C fleet. As a result, a decision was made in May 2002 to replace the wings with spares taken from ex-USAF F-111Fs stored at the Aerospace Maintenance and Regeneration Center (AMARC). The short span wings underwent a refurbishment in Australia, which included extending the span, in effect making the wings the same as the F-111C and F-111G models. Following the Avionics Upgrade Program, Australian F-111s received weapons system and various other upgrades.

== Design ==
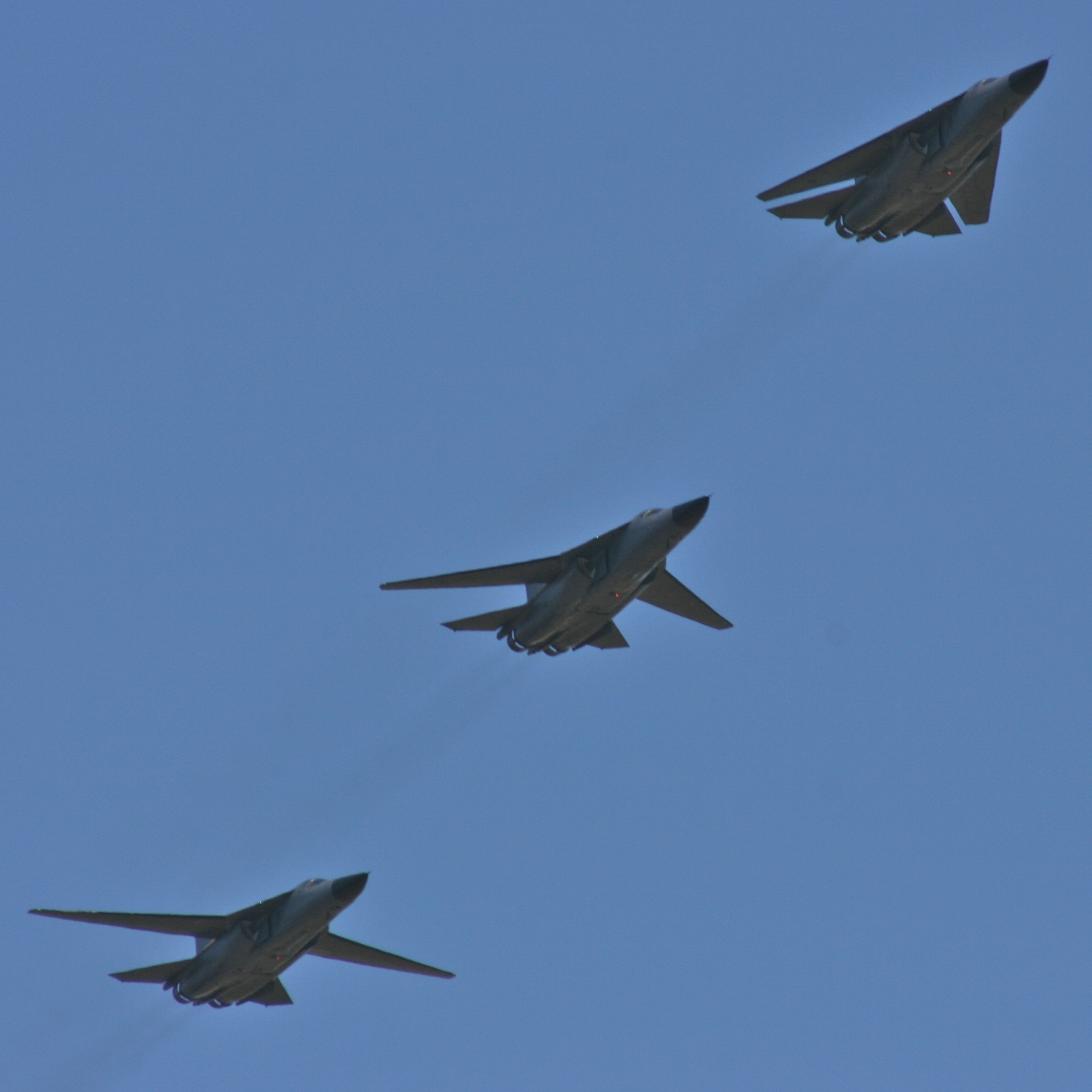
Three F-111Cs with their wings in different positions

The F-111 was an all-weather attack aircraft capable of low-level penetration of enemy defenses to deliver ordnance on the target. It featured variable geometry wings, an internal weapons bay and a cockpit with side-by-side seating. The cockpit formed part of an escape crew capsule. The F-111 had a three-point undercarriage arrangement with a two-wheel nose gear and two single-wheel main undercarriage. Most F-111 variants included a terrain-following radar system connected to the autopilot. The aircraft were powered by two Pratt & Whitney TF30 afterburning turbofan engines.

The F-111's internal weapons bay could also carry bombs, a removable 20 mm M61 cannon, or auxiliary fuel tanks. The F-111C was equipped to carry the AN/AVQ-26 Pave Tack targeting system on a rotating carriage that kept the pod protected within the weapons bay when not in use. Pave Tack is a FLIR and laser rangefinder/designator that allowed the F-111 to designate targets and drop laser-guided bombs on them. RF-111Cs carried a pallet of sensors and cameras for reconnaissance use. F-111Cs were also equipped to launch the AGM-84 Harpoon anti-ship missile and the AGM-142 Popeye stand-off missile.

== Operational history ==
=== Entry into service ===
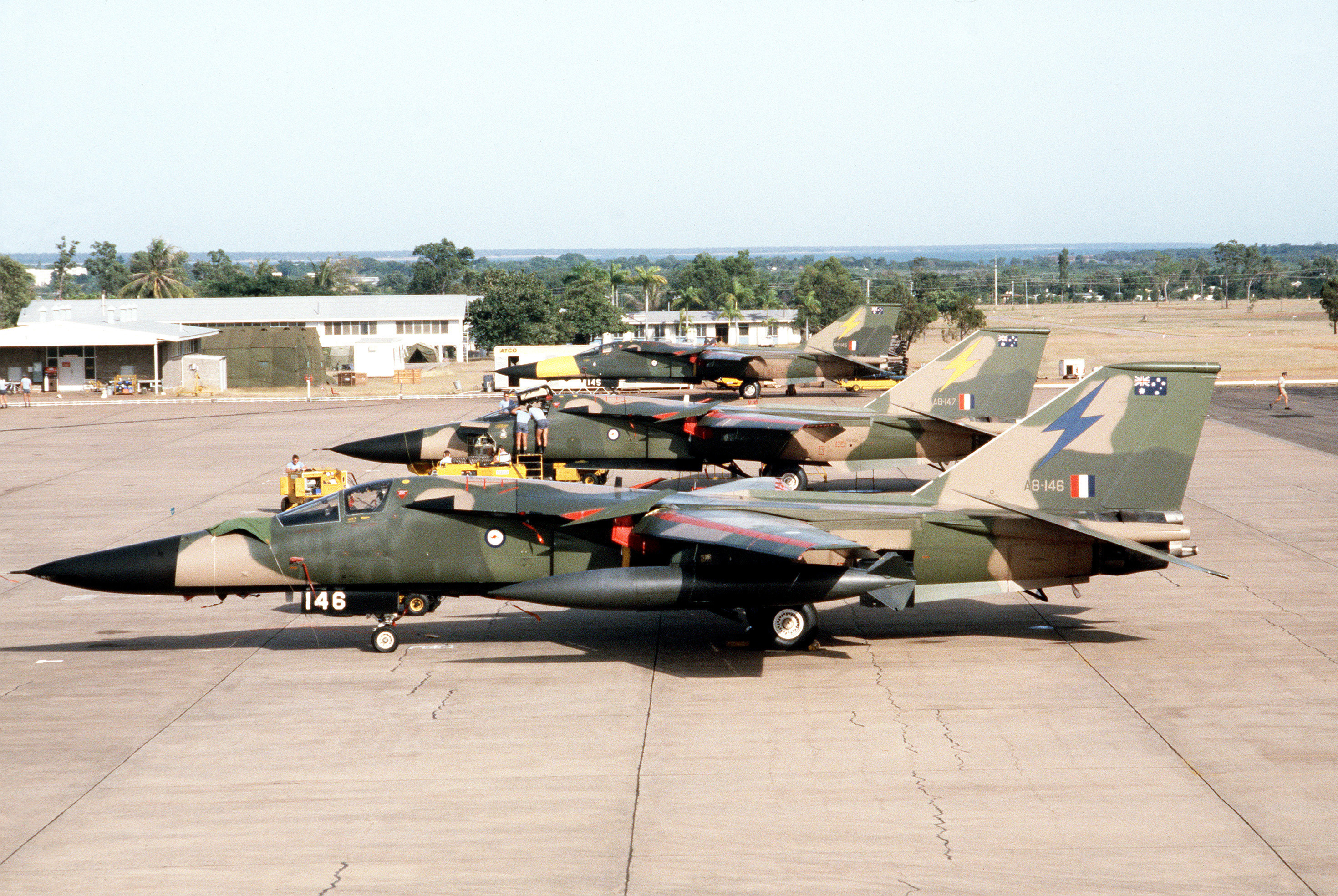
A left-side view of three RAAF F-111s parked on the flight line during the joint Australia/New Zealand/U.S. "Exercise Pitch Black '84"

The Australian government ordered 24 F-111C aircraft to replace the RAAF's Canberras in the bombing and tactical strike role. While the first aircraft was officially handed over on 4 September 1968, structural issues delayed the entry into service of the F-111C. Twenty-four USAF F-4 Phantom IIs were leased as an interim measure. The Phantoms were delivered in September and October 1970 to No. 82 Wing at RAAF Base Amberley, Queensland. During its next three years in RAAF service, one F-4 was lost. By June 1973, the remaining 23 Phantoms were returned to the U.S. Like the F-111, the F-4 was a two-seat, multi-role, supersonic aircraft. Much more sophisticated than the Canberra, capable of air-to-air and air-to-ground attack roles; it had inertial navigation, a gun and radar. Experience with the F-4 likely contributed to the RAAF's success with the F-111. The RAAF proposed keeping the F-4 and using it with the F-111, but the government decided that the cost was too great.

The F-111C entered Australian service after the technical problems were resolved, and the first F-111C was accepted at Nellis Air Force Base on 15 March 1973. On 31 March, the RAAF Washington Flying Unit was formed at McClellan Air Force Base in California with the mission of ferrying the first 12 F-111Cs to Australia. This unit was commanded by Group Captain John Newham, who later served as Chief of the Air Staff between 1985 and 1988. The RAAF's first six F-111Cs arrived at Amberley on 1 July 1973, and three subsequent groups of six F-111s arrived on 27 July, 28 September and 4 December. F-111Cs were allocated to No. 1 Squadron and No. 6 Squadron, under the control of No. 82 Wing. No. 1 Squadron was the RAAF's strike squadron, and maintained a nominal strength of 12 F-111s. No. 6 Squadron mainly served as the F-111 operational conversion unit, though it also operated the RF-111 aircraft at times and could serve in the strike role if required. Once in RAAF service, all F-111 maintenance was undertaken at Amberley. From 1973 to 2001 No. 482 Squadron conducted intermediate maintenance of the aircraft, while heavy maintenance was the responsibility of No. 3 Aircraft Depot. No. 482 Squadron also operated the RAAF's F-111 flight simulator. From 2001 onwards, Boeing Australia performed all F-111 maintenance under a contract with the Australian government.

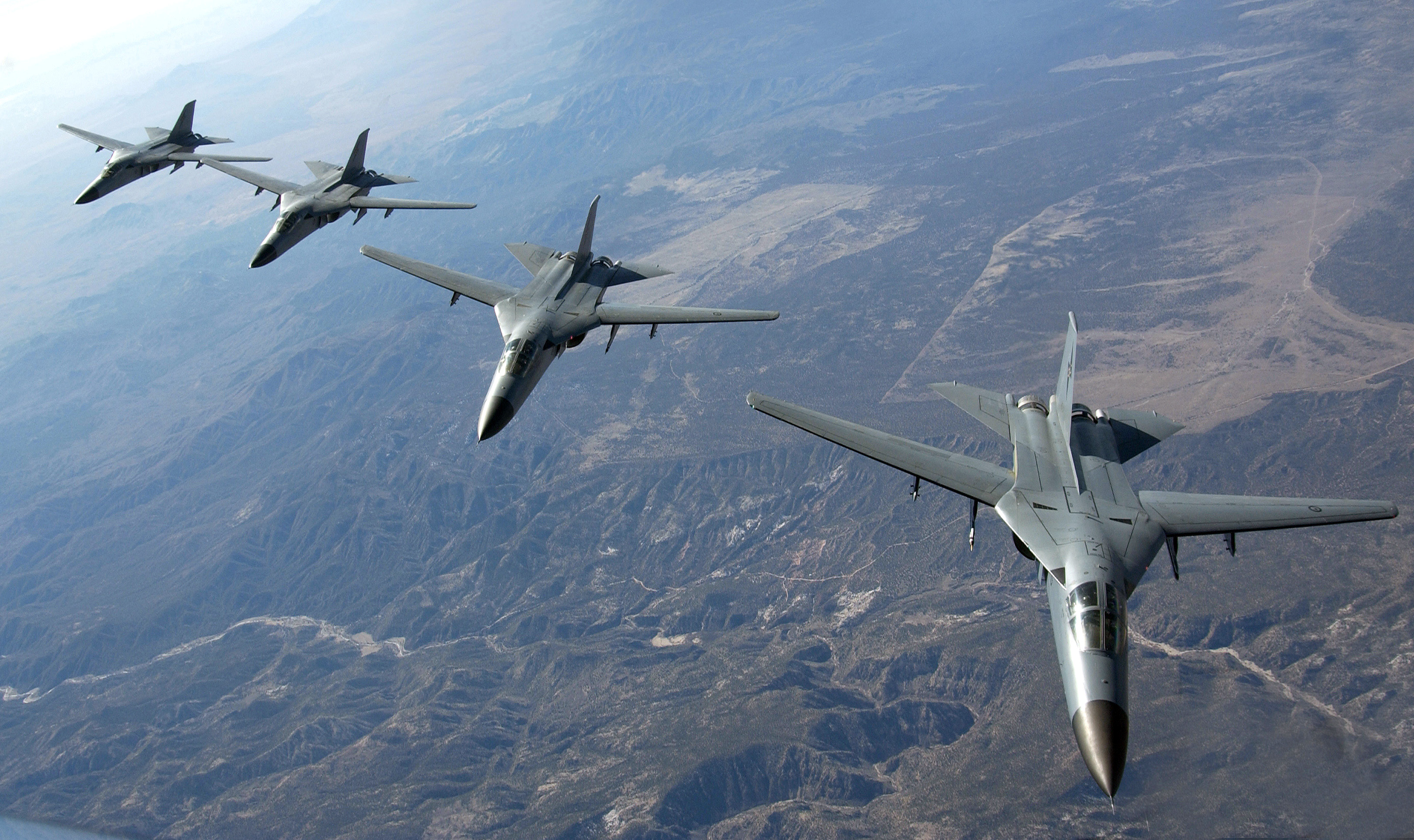
Four Australian F-111s flying towards Nellis Air Force Base after a refueling exercise during Red Flag 2006

After entering service the F-111 proved highly successful. Although it never saw combat, the F-111C was the fastest, longest range combat aircraft in Southeast Asia. Aviation historian Alan Stephens has written that they were "the preeminent weapons system in the Asia-Pacific region" throughout their service and provided Australia with "a genuine, independent strike capability". Stewart Wilson, in his book Lincoln, Canberra and F-111 in Australian Service, described the F-111C as "an unqualified success..., providing Australia with a potent strike capability in an aircraft which, a quarter of century after its first flight remains second to none." Former Indonesian defense minister Benny Murdani told his counterpart Kim Beazley that when others became upset with Australia during cabinet meetings, Murdani told them "Do you realize the Australians have a bomber that can put a bomb through that window on to the table here in front of us?"

=== Gulf War and East Timor ===
During late 1990 and early 1991 the Australian government considered deploying F-111Cs to expand the Australian contribution to the 1991 Gulf War, which mainly comprised a Royal Australian Navy task group. The Department of Defence and Department of Foreign Affairs and Trade's (DFAT) preferred option if the government decided to expand Australia's commitment was to deploy at least two RF-111s, though these aircraft would need to have their electronic warfare equipment upgraded to operate in this war zone. Due to the small size of the RF-111 force, the loss of any of these aircraft in combat would have inflicted a heavy blow on Australia's reconnaissance capability. The second preference in the advice put to the government was to deploy a squadron of four to eight F-111Cs, though Defence did not support this. In the event, the government decided to not expand the Australian force. As a result, the F-111Cs' contribution to the war was limited to conducting intensive exercises with the Naval ships as they sailed through Australian waters en route to the Persian Gulf.

The Australian-led INTERFET intervention into East Timor in September 1999 marked the closest Australia's F-111s ever came to combat. F-111s from both No. 1 and No. 6 Squadrons were deployed to RAAF Base Tindal, Northern Territory, on 28 August to support the international forces, and remained there until 17 December 1999. This was a maximum effort for No. 82 Wing, and up to 10 F-111Cs were available at Tindal; No. 1 Squadron's commitment peaked at six aircraft and about 100 personnel. No. 75 Squadron also maintained 12 F/A-18s at its home base of Tindal to support INTERFET if needed. From 20 September, when INTERFET began to arrive in East Timor, the F-111s were maintained at a high level of readiness to conduct reconnaissance flights or air strikes if the situation deteriorated. For the latter role two F-111s armed with concrete-filled bombs fitted with precision guidance kits were kept available at all times. INTERFET did not encounter significant resistance, however, and F-111 operations were limited to reconnaissance missions conducted by RF-111Cs from 5 November. Each of these sorties were made after gaining approval from the Indonesian government and normally focused on bridges and communications installations. The last RF-111C flight over East Timor took place on 9 December. War games had the F-111s achieving complete success if a strike was necessary against Indonesian military headquarters near the capital.

=== Other roles and controversies ===
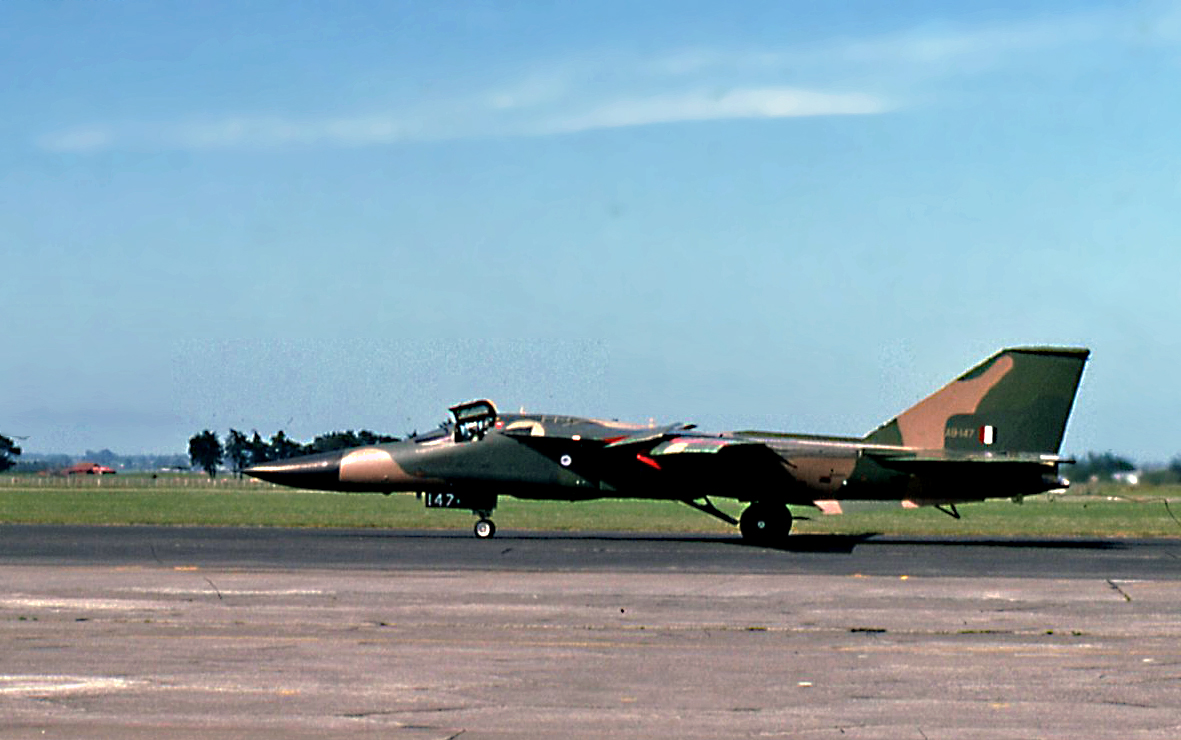
An RAAF F-111 at Ohakea, New Zealand in 1975

The Royal Australian Air Force's F-111 fleet was at times controversial. The long delay to the delivery of the aircraft was a significant political issue in the late 1960s and early 1970s. This occurred around the same time that massive delays and cost blowouts to the Sydney Opera House were making headlines, prompting some commentators to dub the F-111 the "Flying Opera House". In 1983 the Hawke government tasked an RF-111 to take surveillance photos of the Franklin Dam project in Tasmania. The use of an RAAF aircraft to "spy" on its own territory led to the minister responsible, Senator Gareth Evans, earning the nickname "Biggles" (after the famous hero pilot of a number of books by Captain W. E. Johns). (Note: Quote: "In preparing the Commonwealth's case for the inevitable High Court challenge by Tasmania, Evans earned the popular title of 'Biggles' for arranging to have Royal Australian Air Force planes fly 'spy flights' over the dam site to collect court evidence.") Another aspect of the F-111 which drew criticism was the poor work conditions for F-111 ground crew involved in sealing/de-sealing F-111 fuel tanks resulted in a class action lawsuit and the Australian government paying out more than A$20 million in damages. The health issues with chemical exposure included permanent brain damage to a number of ground crew before conditions were improved.

A number of ex-USAF aircraft were delivered to Australia as attrition replacements and to enlarge the fleet. Four aircraft modified to the F-111C standard were delivered in 1982. The government bought 15 F-111Gs to supplement its F-111Cs in 1992 and delivered in 1994. Additional stored ex-USAF F-111s were reserved as a spare parts sources.

Seven of the 28 F-111Cs and one of the 15 F-111Gs were destroyed in accidents during their service with the RAAF. These accidents took the lives of 10 air crew. The accidents occurred from 1977 to 1999.

The F-111's fuel dump was located right between its turbofan engines, so engaging afterburners during a fuel dump would cause an ignition five feet behind the aircraft. Although strongly discouraged by the USAF, the RAAF F-111Cs frequently did these "Dump & Burn" maneuvers (also known as the "Zippo" and the "Torch") starting at Maple Flag in the 1980s.

In 2000, two women graduated from the No. 6 Squadron conversion course becoming the first female F-111 Navigators.

In mid-2006, an RAAF F-111 was chosen to scuttle the North Korean ship Pong Su which had been involved in one of Australia's largest drug hauls in recorded history. The ship had been sitting in Snails Bay, off Birchgrove, while the government considered its fate, and it was decided in March 2006 it would be scuttled by air attack. The Pong Su was sunk on 23 March 2006 by two GBU-10 Paveway II laser-guided bombs.

Due to the airframe components of the F-111 containing asbestos, the remaining aircraft were buried. Six were spared for museum display.

=== Retirement ===
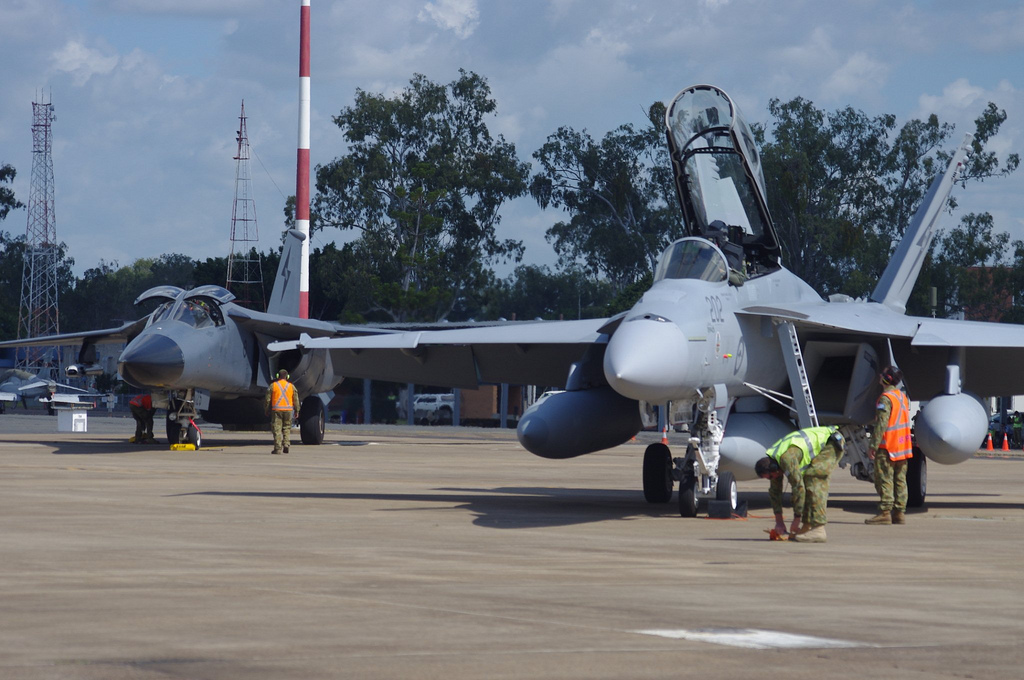
An F-111C (at left) with one of the RAAF's first two F/A-18Fs.

In 2007, Australia decided to retire all of its RAAF F-111s. The drawdown of the RAAF's F-111 fleet began with the retirement of the F-111G models operated by No. 6 Squadron in late 2007. The United States had retired the F-111 (it "was nine percent of Tactical Air Command's fleet but ate up a whopping 25 percent of the maintenance budget", USAF pilot Richard Crandall said) so Australia was the only operator. By 2009 the remaining 18 aircraft reportedly required the most maintenance of any warplane in the world, an average of 180 hours for every flight hour compared to 30 hours for the F-22 Raptor. In March 2008, after a review, the new Labor government confirmed the previous Howard Government's decision to purchase 24 F/A-18F Super Hornets until the delivery of the F-35 Lightning II; in 2010, the government signed the acquisition contract. The final RAAF F-111 aircrew conversion took place in 2009, with four pilots and two Air Combat Officers (ACOs) qualifying. The RAAF retired its last F-111s on 3 December 2010, after the final flight by aircraft from No. 6 Squadron over southern Queensland.

Between 21 and 24 November 2011, 23 of the RAAF's F-111C and F-111Gs which had not been selected for preservation were buried at the Swanbank landfill site outside of Ipswich, Queensland. The RAAF had considered scrapping these aircraft, but concluded that it would be cheaper to bury them as they also contained asbestos in the airframes. The remaining ex-RAAF F-111s will be placed on display.

== Variants ==
=== F-111C ===
The F-111C was the export version for Australia, combining the F-111A design with the longer F-111B wings and the strengthened FB-111A undercarriage.

=== RF-111C ===
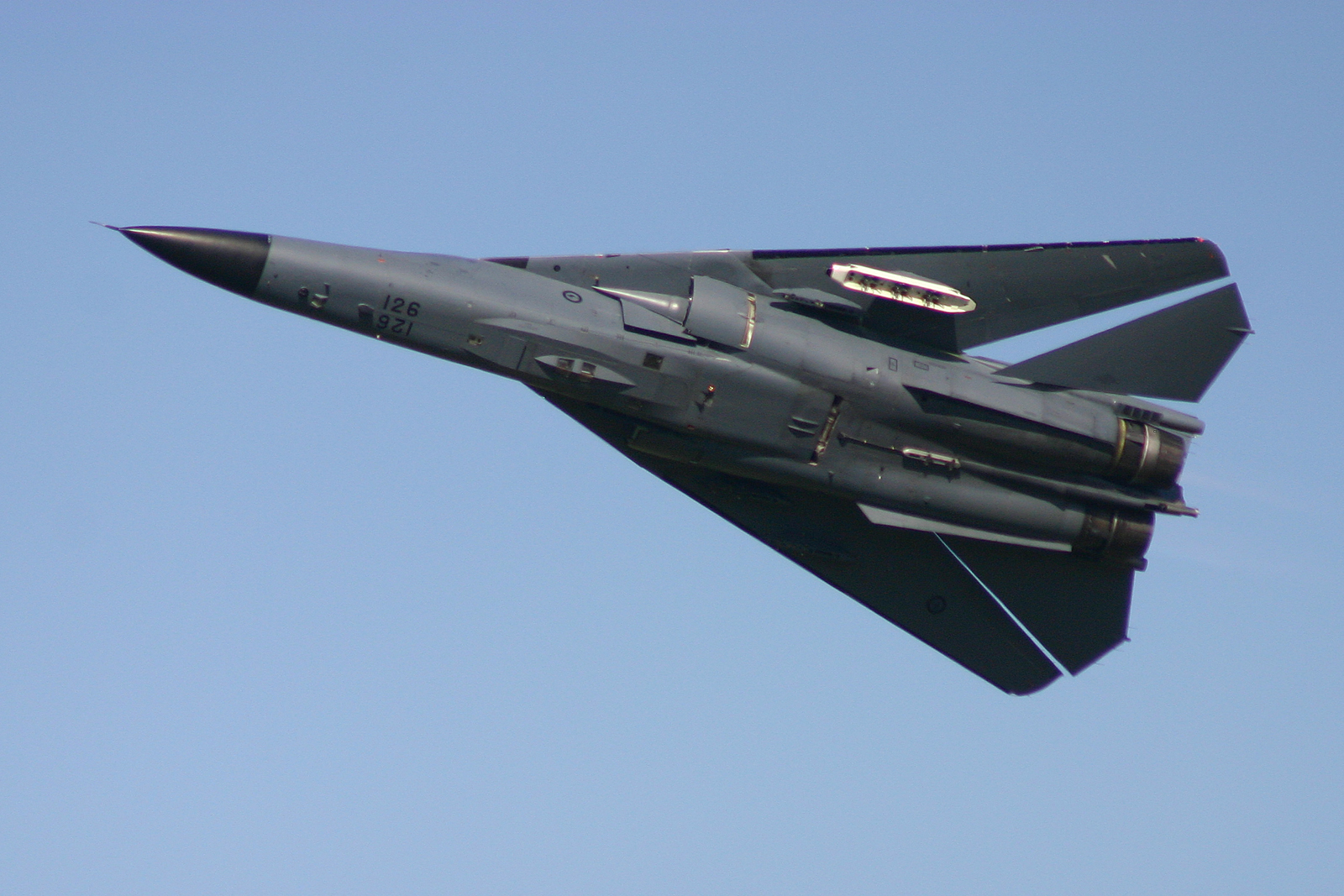
Belly view of a RF-111C with its four camera apertures on the reconnaissance pallet, 2008

Four F-111C aircraft were modified to RF-111C reconnaissance configuration. These aircraft met the RAAF's requirement for aircraft to reinstate its photographic reconnaissance capacity. While the original order for F-111s specified that 18 would be strike variants and six reconnaissance variants, the RAAF later agreed to accept all 24 as strike aircraft and later retrofit six with reconnaissance pallets. In 1971 the USAF dropped plans to fit some of its F-111s as reconnaissance aircraft, but sold the design of the reconnaissance pallet to Australia for $3 million. At this time the RAAF decided to fit the pallet to four rather than six aircraft. The reconnaissance pallet contains four cameras and an infrared linescanner unit and is fitted in the F-111's weapons bay. The RF-111Cs retained their strike capability.

The first F-111C, A8-126 selected for conversion to the RF-111C variant was modified at General Dynamics plant at Fort Worth, Texas between October 1978 and 18 April 1979. After four months of test flights, the aircraft returned to Australia in August 1979 where it conducted further tropical weather trials at Darwin. The other three aircraft were modified by the RAAF's No. 3 Aircraft Depot at RAAF Base Amberley in 1980, using kits purchased from General Dynamics. The RF-111C variant proved to be highly successful, and was considered to be among the best tactical reconnaissance aircraft in the world. Three of the four RF-111Cs remained in RAAF service until 2010. The other aircraft was retired in 2006 after suffering damage from landing on its belly after one of its main wheels separated during takeoff; although the aircraft was repairable it was judged not worthwhile doing so due to the impending retirement of the entire F-111 fleet. The RAAF does not have an aircraft with the RF-111C's intelligence, surveillance and reconnaissance capabilities since they were retired.

== Operators ==
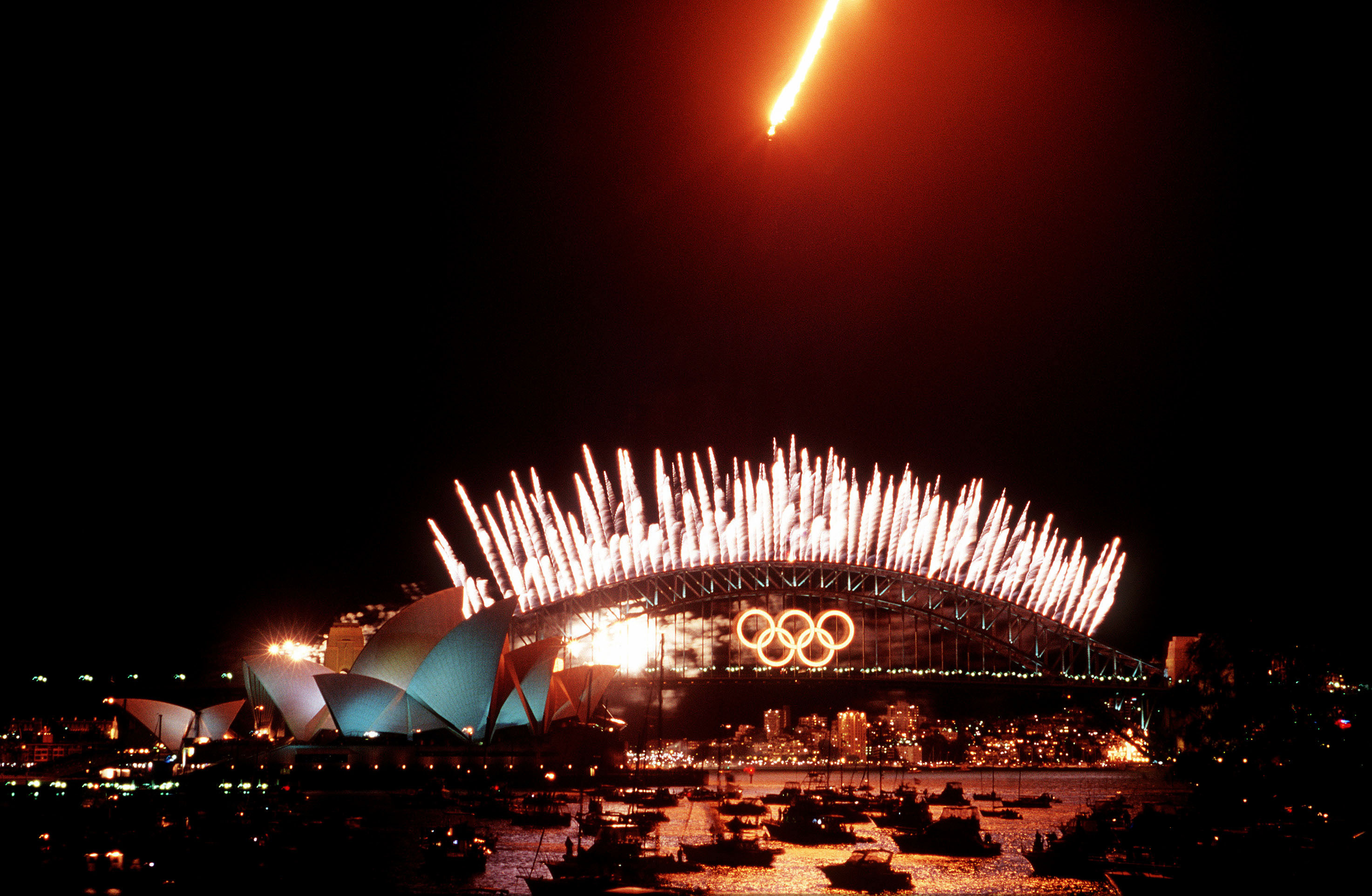
An Australian F-111 overflies the Sydney Harbour Bridge performing the "dump-and-burn" to mark the conclusion of the 2000 Summer Olympics.

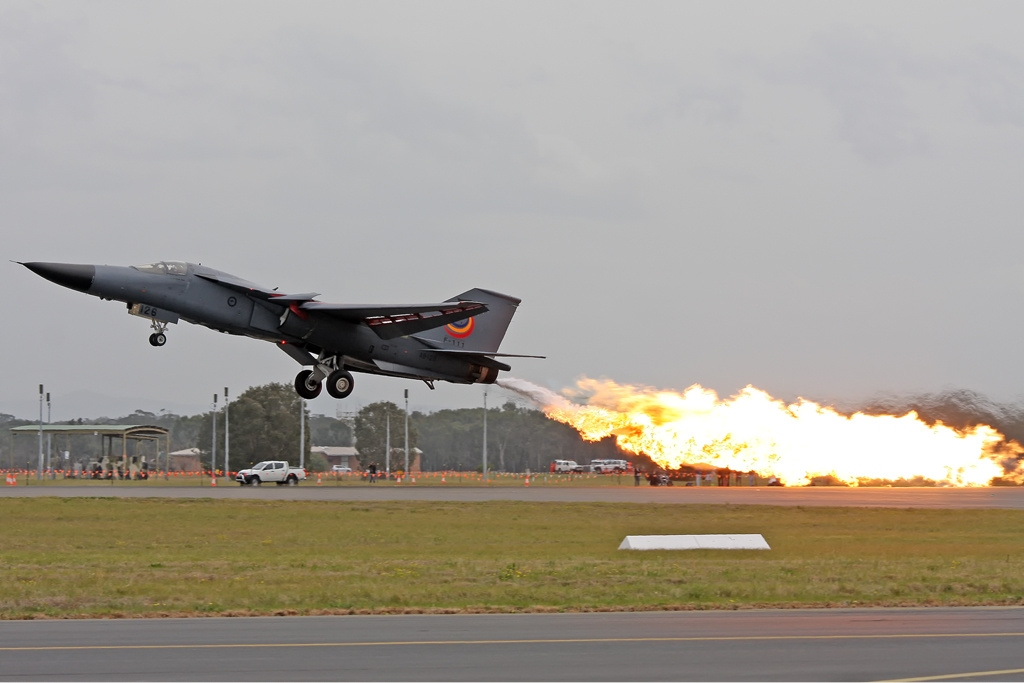
A Royal Australian Air Force F-111C performing a dump-and-burn, a procedure where the fuel is intentionally ignited using the aircraft's afterburner.

Australia

- Royal Australian Air Force
  - No. 82 Wing – RAAF Base Amberley
    - No. 1 Squadron F-111C (1973–2009)
    - No. 6 Squadron F-111C (1973–2010), F-111G (1993–2007)
  - Aircraft Research and Development Unit RAAF (during trials)

== Aircraft on display ==
=== Australia ===
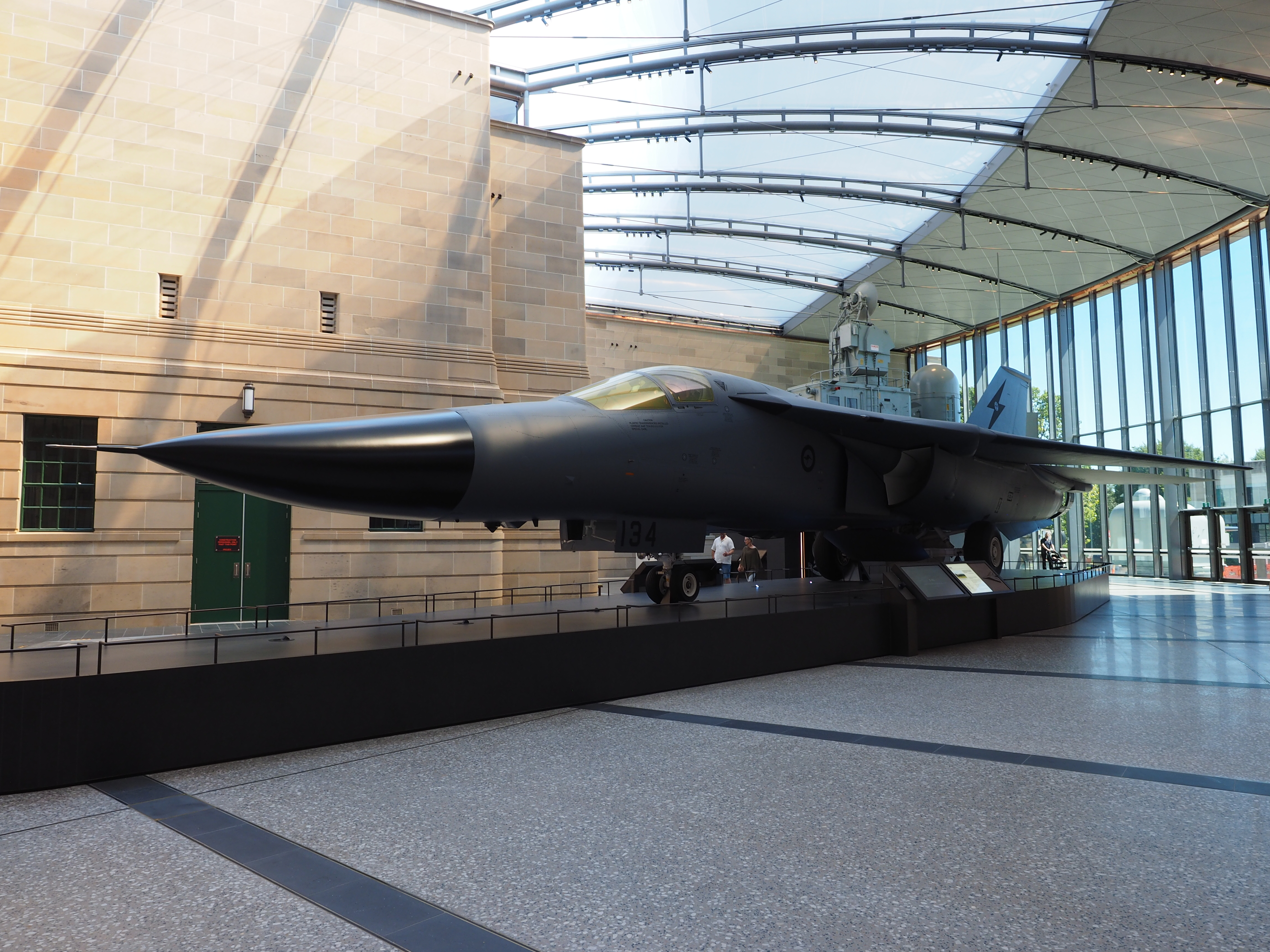
RF-111C A8-134 on display at the Australian War Memorial

F-111C

- A8-109 – Historical Aircraft Restoration Society, Albion Park
- A8-113 – Darwin Aviation Museum, Winnellie, NT
- A8-125 – RAAF Museum, Point Cook, Victoria (stored)
- A8-126 – RAAF Amberley Aviation Heritage Centre, Qld
- A8-129 – Queensland Air Museum, Caloundra
- A8-131 – Moorabbin Air Museum, Vic (cockpit module only)
- A8-132 – South Australian Aviation Museum, Port Adelaide, SA
- A8-134 – Australian War Memorial, Canberra
- A8-135 – Caboolture Warplane and Heritage Museum, Qld (cockpit module only)
- A8-136 – RAAF Amberley Aviation Heritage Centre, Qld (cockpit module only)
- A8-138 – RAAF Amberley, Qld (gate guard)
- A8-140 – Royal Australian Air Force Association Museum, Bull Creek, WA (cockpit module only)
- A8-141 – RAAF Amberley Aviation Heritage Centre, Qld (cockpit module only)
- A8-142 – RAAF Wagga Wagga, NSW (gate guard)
- A8-147 – Evans Head Memorial Aerodrome Heritage Aviation Association, NSW)
- A8-148 – Fighter World, Williamtown, NSW

=== United States ===
F-111C

- A8-130 – Pacific Aviation Museum, Ford Island-Pearl Harbor, Hawaii

== Specifications (F-111C) ==
An orthographically projected diagram of the F-111

Data from Wilson and Pittaway

General characteristics

- Crew: 2 (pilot and weapons system operator)
- Length: 73 ft 6 in (22.4 m)
- Wingspan: 70 ft 0 in (21.33 m)
- Swept wingspan: 33 ft 11 in (10.35 m) swept
- Height: 17 ft 2 in (5.22 m)
- Wing area: 657.4 sq ft (61.07 m^{2}) spread, 525 sq ft (48.8 m^{2}) swept
- Aspect ratio: 7.56 spread; 1.95 swept
- Airfoil: root: NACA 64-210.68; tip: NACA 64-209.80
- Empty weight: 47,179 lb (21,400 kg)
- Gross weight: 89,397 lb (40,550 kg)
- Max takeoff weight: 110,002 lb (49,896 kg)
- Powerplant: 2 × Pratt & Whitney TF30-P-100 afterburning turbofan engines, 17,900 lbf (80 kN) thrust each dry, 25,100 lbf (112 kN) with afterburner

Performance

- Maximum speed: 1,434 kn (1,650 mph, 2,656 km/h)
- Maximum speed: Mach 2.5
- Combat range: 1,160 nmi (1,330 mi, 2,150 km)
- Ferry range: 3,700 nmi (4,300 mi, 6,900 km)
- Service ceiling: 66,000 ft (20,000 m)
- Rate of climb: 25,890 ft/min (131.5 m/s)
- Lift-to-drag: 15.8
- Wing loading: 126 lb/sq ft (620 kg/m^{2}) wings spread

158 lb/sq ft (771.4 kg/m^{2}) wings swept

- Thrust/weight: 0.61
- Zero-lift drag coefficient: 0.0186
- Drag area: 9.36 sq ft (0.9 m^{2})

Armament

- Guns: 1× M61 Vulcan 20 mm (0.787 in) Gatling cannon with 2,050 rounds (seldom fitted)
- Hardpoints: 9 in total (8× under-wing, 1× underfuselage between engines) with a capacity of 31,500 lb (14,288 kg) ordnance mounted externally on hardpoints and internally in fuselage weapons bay

== See also ==
Related development

- General Dynamics F-111 Aardvark
- General Dynamics–Grumman F-111B
- General Dynamics–Grumman EF-111A Raven
- General Dynamics–Boeing AFTI/F-111A Aardvark
- General Dynamics F-111K

Aircraft of comparable role, configuration, and era

- BAC TSR-2
- Sukhoi Su-24
- Panavia Tornado

Related lists

- List of bomber aircraft
- List of General Dynamics F-111 aircraft operated by the Royal Australian Air Force
