= Barkey =

Barkey is a surname. Barkey is a variant spelling of the Swiss German Bürki; topographic name for someone who lived by a birch tree or birch grove and in some cases it may have been a topographic name for someone who lived by a stream as Birke also means ‘brook' or ‘stream’.

Barkey may refer to:

- Denver Barkey, Canadian ice hockey player
- Herman Barkey, American engineer
- Karen Barkey, American sociology professor
- Ursel Barkey, German figure skater
