= Robert H. Widmer =

American aeronautical engineer

- Born: May 17, 1916; Hawthorne, New Jersey
- Died: June 20, 2011 (aged 95); Fort Worth, Texas
- Education: Rensselaer Polytechnic Institute; Caltech
- Engineering career
- Discipline: Aeronautical engineering
- Employer: Convair
- Significant design: B-58 Hustler; F-111 Aardvark; F-16 Fighting Falcon

Robert Henry Widmer (May 17, 1916 – June 20, 2011) was an American aeronautical engineer who specialized in designing aircraft for the military. He spent his career working for Convair which became General Dynamics, then Lockheed, and then Lockheed Martin.

His feisty personality and at times insubordinate attitude at one time led company leaders to strongly consider firing him. However, his brilliance at envisioning and designing desirable aircraft years before there was even a market for them led to his appointment as Vice President for science and engineering for all of General Dynamics.

== Early life ==
Born in Hawthorne, New Jersey, Widmer earned degrees from Rensselaer Polytechnic Institute and the California Institute of Technology.

== Career ==
=== Convair ===
He began his career working for the California division of Convair, initially as a designer of marine aircraft. He eventually joined the company's main branch in Fort Worth, Texas, where he notably designed the Convair B-58 Hustler which was the first United States Air Force's bomber capable of Mach 2.

=== General Dynamics ===
F-111 design

He went on to lead the design teams for the General Dynamics F-111 Aardvark and the General Dynamics F-16 Fighting Falcon. In 1983 he was awarded the Reed Aeronautics Award by the American Institute of Aeronautics and Astronautics. The award credited him with leading the design of four major Air Force aircraft, the B-36, B-58, F-111, and F-16, and for "pioneering the eras of supersonic cruise and fly-by-wire computerized flight control". In 1962, he was awarded the Spirit of St. Louis Medal by the American Society of Mechanical Engineers for his work on the B-58. In 2007, he was inducted into the Rensselaer Alumni Hall of Fame.

== Personal life ==
Widmer died in Fort Worth, Texas in 2011 at the age of 95.

== See also ==
- Herman Barkey (1909-2005), designer of the McDonnell Douglas F-4 Phantom II
- Harry Hillaker (1919-2009), designer of the General Dynamics F-16 Fighting Falcon
