= Herman Barkey =

American engineer (1909–2005)

Herman Daniel Barkey (12 April 1909 - 9 December 2005) was an American engineer, who led the design team for the McDonnell Aircraft F-4 Phantom.

== Early life ==
He was born in North Judson, Indiana to Daniel and Mary Barkey who were German immigrants.

He had a sister Sophia. He attended secondary school in Kewanna, Indiana, the same school that his wife would attend.

He gained a university degree in mechanical engineering from the University of Notre Dame, in Indiana, and another in aeronautical engineering.

== Career ==
=== Curtiss-Wright ===
He joined Curtiss-Wright.

=== McDonnell Aircraft ===
McDonnell Aircraft Corporation was founded by James Smith McDonnell in July 1939. Barkey joined the company in 1945.

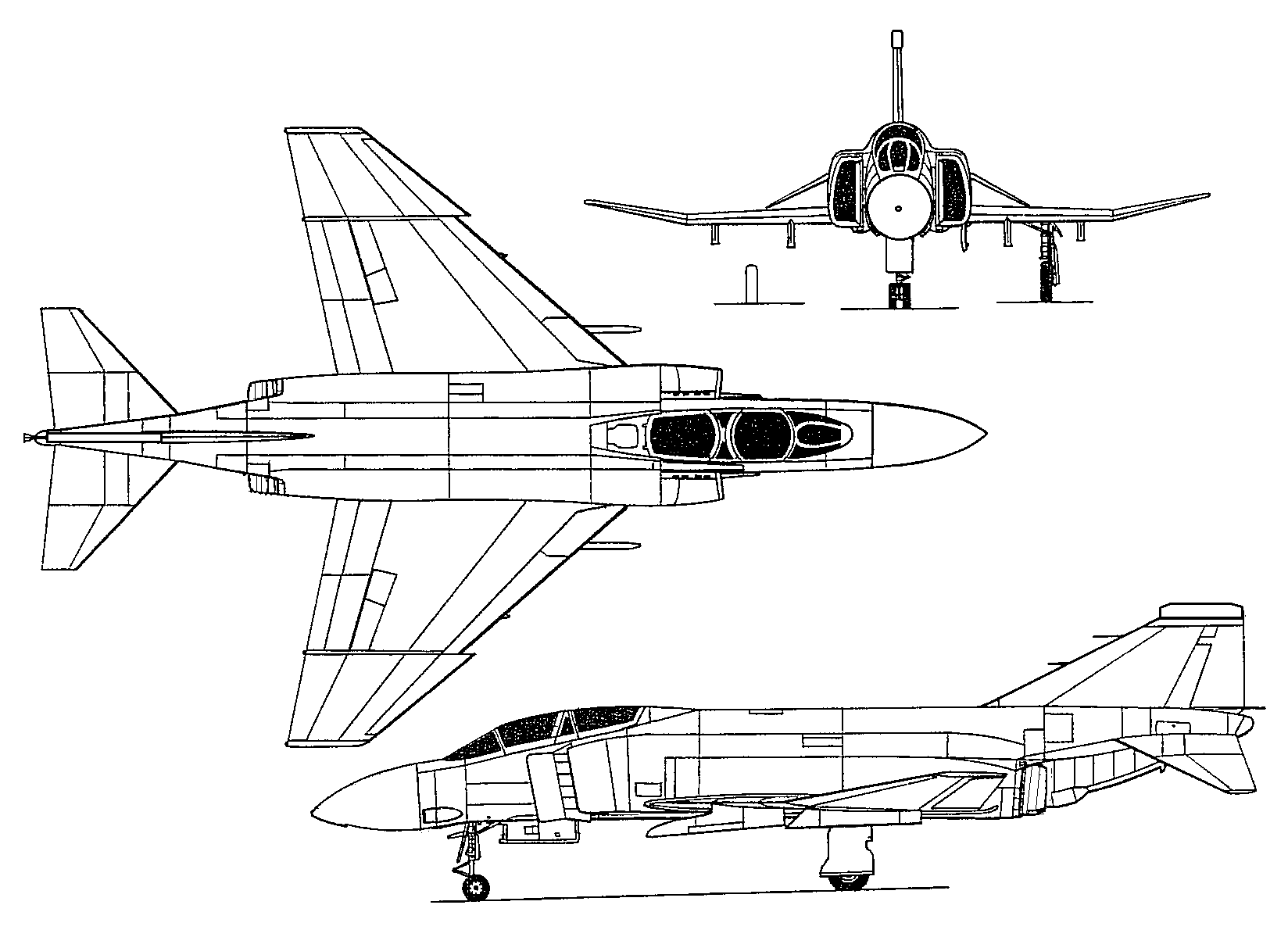
Design of the F-4 Phantom

He was head of the design team for the F-4 Phantom aircraft, and largely responsible for its entire development, being the chief engineer. The aircraft was first designed for two engine types - the Wright J65 or the General Electric J79. On 26 May 1955, he decided to make the Phantom a two-man aircraft. The outboard panels would have 12 degrees of dihedral.

The Phantom was first flown on 27 May 1958 by Bob Little. McDonnell Aircraft named its series of aircraft after mythical creatures.

The 1000th Phantom was produced in 1965, followed by the 2000th Phantom on 12 March 1967, the 3000th Phantom on 5 September 1968, the 4000th Phantom on 1 February 1971, and the 5000th Phantom on 24 May 1974 (inaugurated by George Graff). Peak production was in June 1967, and the last Phantom was made on 26 October 1979.

In 1973 he received an award from the American Institute of Aeronautics and Astronautics. He retired in 1974.

== Personal life ==
He married Nettie Arline Foglesong in 1937 in Indiana, daughter of Ralph Foglesong (1887–1965) and Polly Parcel; she died in September 2004. From 1996 he had lived in Town and Country, Missouri.

He died aged 96 in Missouri. His funeral was in Manchester, Missouri on Thursday 15 December 2005.

== See also ==
- Robert H. Widmer, designer of the F-111
