= General Dynamics F-111 Aardvark =

Family of strike aircraft developed in 1960s

F-111 Aardvark
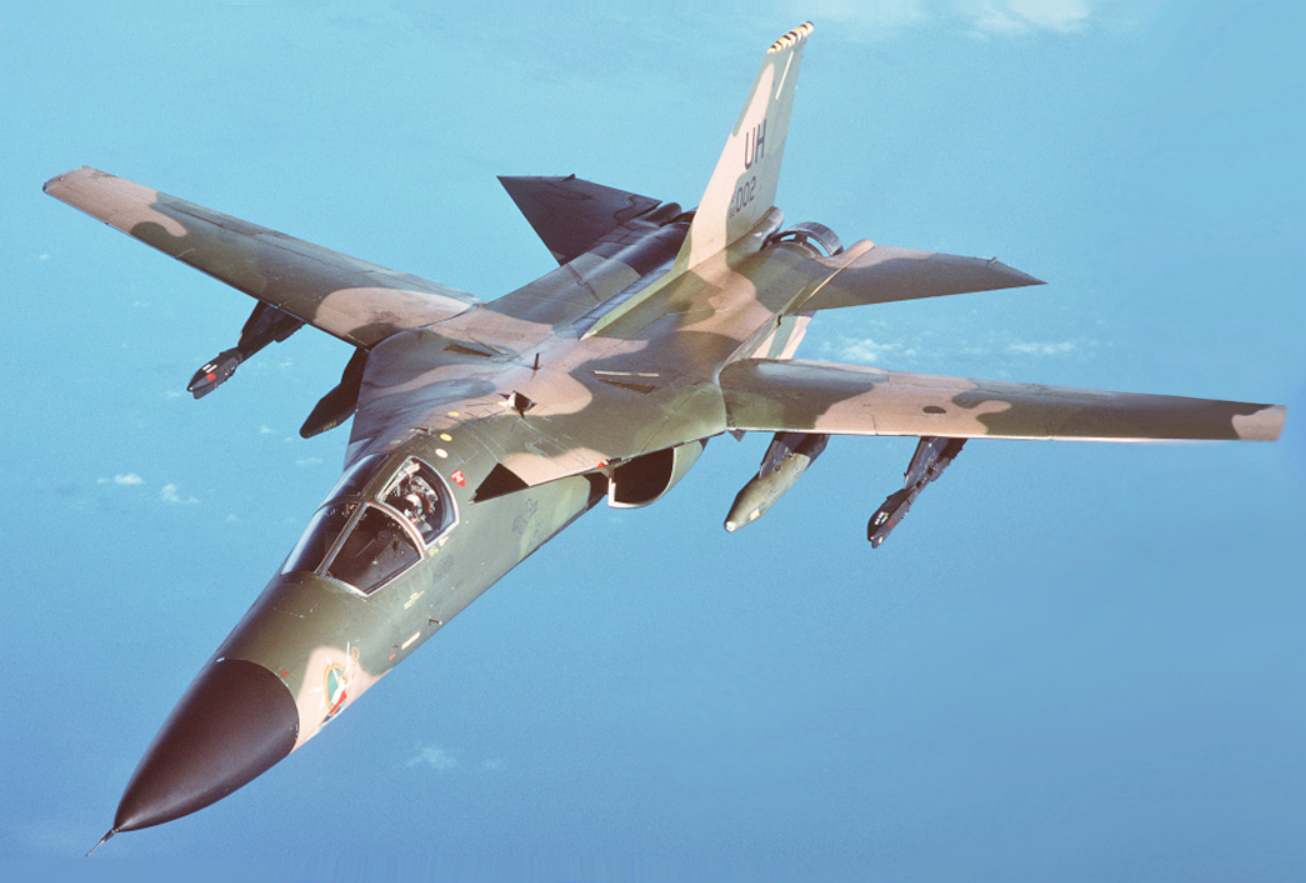
- An F-111 flying over the North Sea in 1989

General information
- Type: Attack aircraft, strategic bomber (FB-111), reconnaissance, electronic warfare (EF-111 Raven)
- National origin: United States
- Manufacturer: General Dynamics
- Status: Retired
- Primary users: United States Air Force (USAF) Royal Australian Air Force (RAAF)
- Number built: 563 (total); 76 (FB-111)

History
- Manufactured: 1964–1976
- Introduction date: 18 July 1967; 59 years ago
- First flight: 21 December 1964; 61 years ago
- Retired: USAF: F-111F, 1996; EF-111A, 1998; RAAF: F-111C, 2010
- Variants: General Dynamics–Grumman F-111B; General Dynamics F-111C; General Dynamics–Grumman EF-111A Raven; General Dynamics F-111K; General Dynamics–Boeing AFTI/F-111A Aardvark

The General Dynamics F-111 Aardvark is a retired, supersonic, medium-range fighter-bomber. Production models of the F-111 had roles that included attack (e.g., interdiction), strategic bombing (including nuclear weapons capabilities), reconnaissance, and electronic warfare. Its name "Aardvark" comes from the long-nosed, insect-eating African animal.

Developed in the 1960s by General Dynamics under Robert McNamara's TFX Program, the F-111 pioneered variable-sweep wings, afterburning turbofan engines, and automated terrain-following radar for low-level, high-speed flight. Its design influenced later variable-sweep wing aircraft, and some of its advanced features have become commonplace. The F-111 suffered problems during initial development, largely related to the engines. A multirole carrier-based fighter/long-range interception variant intended for the United States Navy, the F-111B, was canceled before production. Several specialized models, such as the FB-111 strategic bomber and the EF-111 electronic warfare aircraft, were also developed.

The F-111 entered service in 1967 with the United States Air Force (USAF). In the meantime, the Australian government had ordered the F-111C, to replace the English Electric Canberra then used by the Royal Australian Air Force (RAAF). The F-111C entered service with the RAAF in 1973.

As early as March 1968, the USAF was deploying F-111s into active combat situations; the type saw heavy use during the latter half of the Vietnam War to conduct low-level, ground-attack missions, flying in excess of 4,000 combat missions while incurring only six combat losses in the theater. The F-111s also participated in the Gulf War (Operation Desert Storm) in 1991; the F-111Fs completed 3.2 successful strike missions for every unsuccessful one, better than any other US strike aircraft used in the operation. RAAF F-111s never saw offensive action, but were deployed periodically as a deterrent, such as for the Australian-led International Force East Timor.

Being relatively expensive to maintain amid post-Cold War budget cuts, the USAF elected to retire its F-111 fleet during the 1990s; the last F-111Fs were withdrawn in 1996, while the remaining EF-111s also departed in 1998. The F-111 was replaced in USAF service by the F-15E Strike Eagle for medium-range, precision strike missions, while the supersonic bomber role has been assumed by the B-1B Lancer. The RAAF continued to operate the type until December 2010, when the last F-111C was retired; its role was transitioned to the Boeing F/A-18E/F Super Hornet as an interim measure until the Lockheed Martin F-35 Lightning II became available.

== Development ==
=== Early requirements ===
The May 1960 U-2 incident, in which an American CIA U-2 reconnaissance plane was shot down over the USSR, stunned the United States government. Besides greatly damaging US–Soviet relations, the incident showed that the Soviet Union had developed a surface-to-air missile that could reach aircraft above 60,000 ft (18,000 m). Consequently, the USAF Strategic Air Command (SAC) and the RAF Bomber Command's plans to send subsonic, high-altitude Boeing B-47 Stratojet and V bomber formations into the USSR were realized to be much less viable.

By 1960, SAC had begun moving to low-level penetration, which greatly reduced radar detection distances. At the time, SAMs were ineffective against low-flying aircraft, while interceptor aircraft had less of a speed advantage at low altitudes. The USAF's Tactical Air Command (TAC) was largely concerned with the fighter-bomber and deep strike/interdiction roles. TAC was in the process of receiving its latest design, the Republic F-105 Thunderchief, which was designed to deliver nuclear weapons fast and far, but required long runways. A simpler variable-geometry wing configuration with the pivot points farther out from the aircraft's centerline was reported by NASA in 1958, which made swing-wings viable. This led USAF leaders to encourage its use.

In June 1960, the USAF issued specification SOR 183 for a long-range, interdiction/strike aircraft able to penetrate Soviet air defenses at very low altitudes and high speeds. Specifically, it was to be capable of at least 800 mi (1,300 km) of low-level flight, half of which was to be at a speed of no less than Mach 1.2. Furthermore, the specification also called for the aircraft to possess short takeoff-and-landing (STOL) capabilities to permit operations from short, unprepared airstrips that had a length of no more than 3,000 ft (900 m). An internal payload of 1,000 lb (450 kg) was to be carried in the primary mission role. A variant suitable for aerial reconnaissance flights was also included in the specification.

Around this time, the United States Navy had been seeking a long-range, high-endurance, fleet air defense fighter to protect its carrier battle groups against long-range antiship missiles launched from Soviet jet bombers and submarines. It would need a more powerful radar and longer-range missiles than the F-4 Phantom II it would replace. The Navy had proposed a subsonic, straight-winged aircraft, the Douglas F6D Missileer in the late 1950s. The Missileer could carry six long-range missiles and loiter for five hours, but would be defenseless after firing its missiles. The program was formally canceled in 1961. The Navy had tried variable-geometry wings with the XF10F Jaguar, but abandoned it in the early 1950s. NASA's simplification made the variable-geometry wings practical. By 1960, increases in aircraft weights required improved high-lift devices, such as variable-geometry wings. Variable geometry offered high speeds, and maneuverability with heavier payloads, long range, and STOL capability.

=== Tactical Fighter Experimental ===
The USAF and Navy were both seeking new aircraft when Robert McNamara was appointed secretary of defense in January 1961. Both sought high-supersonic, twin-engined, two-seat aircraft that could carry heavy armament and fuel loads and probably use variable-geometry wings. On 14 February 1961, McNamara formally directed the services to study the development of a single aircraft that would satisfy both requirements. Early studies indicated that the best option was to base the design on the USAF requirement, and use a modified version for the Navy. In June 1961, Secretary McNamara ordered the go-ahead of Tactical Fighter Experimental (TFX), despite USAF and Navy efforts to keep their programs separate. According to aviation author Peter E. Davis, military officials were disconcerted by McNamara's focus on compromised requirements for financial reasons.

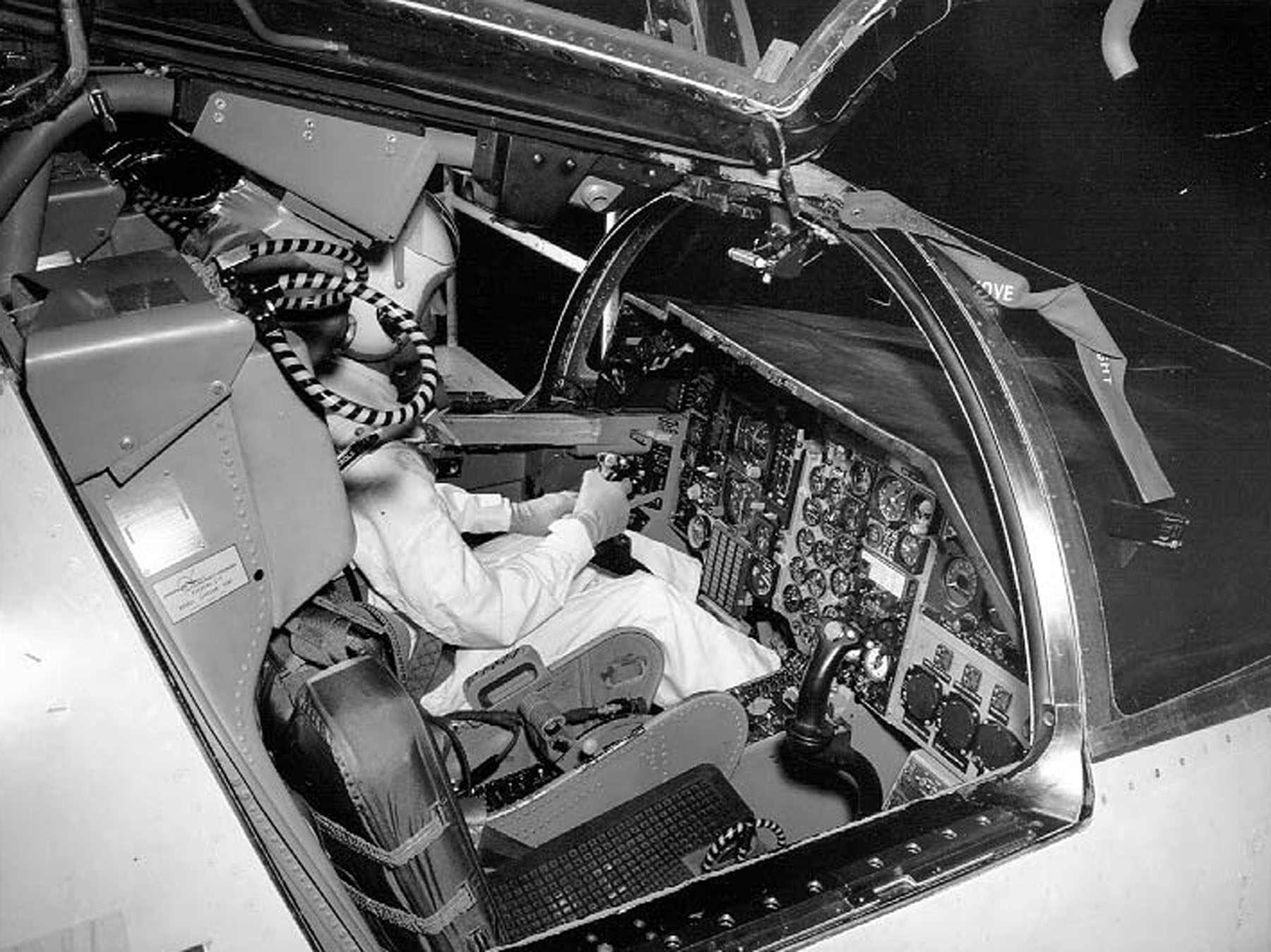
The side-by-side seating adopted in the F-111

The two services could agree only on swing-wing, two-seat, twin-engined design features. The USAF wanted a tandem-seat aircraft for low-level penetration ground attack, while the Navy wanted a shorter, high-altitude interceptor with side-by-side seating to allow the pilot and radar operator to share the radar display. Also, the USAF wanted the aircraft designed for 7.33 g with Mach 2.5 speed at altitude and Mach 1.2 speed at low level with an approximate length of 70 ft (21.3 m). The Navy had less strenuous requirements: 6 g with Mach 2 speed at altitude and high subsonic speed (about Mach 0.9) at low level with a length of 56 ft (17.1 m). The Navy also wanted the aircraft with a nose large enough for a 48 in (1.2 m) diameter radar dish.

McNamara developed a basic set of requirements for TFX based largely on the USAF's requirements, and on 1 September 1961, ordered the USAF to develop it. Nevertheless, a request for proposals for the TFX was provided to industry in October 1961. In December, proposals were received from Boeing, General Dynamics, Lockheed, McDonnell, North American, and Republic. The evaluation group found all the proposals lacking, but Boeing and General Dynamics were selected to submit enhanced designs. Boeing's proposal was recommended by the selection board in January 1962, with the exception of the engine, which was not considered acceptable. The board also directed alterations to radar and missile storage and a switch from ejection seats to a crew-escape capsule. Both companies provided updated proposals in April 1962. USAF reviewers favored Boeing's offering, while the Navy found both submissions unacceptable for its operations. Two more rounds of updates to the proposals were conducted, and the board eventually recommended the Boeing design.

But in November 1962, McNamara selected General Dynamics' proposal due to its greater commonality between USAF and Navy versions. The Boeing aircraft shared less than half of the major structural components. On 21 December 1962, General Dynamics signed the TFX contract. A congressional investigation into the procurement process was conducted, but did not change the selection. On 1 May 1964, the definitized contract was issued for the program, including flight testing, spares, ground equipment, training devices, static and fatigue test data, and the production of an initial 23 F-111 aircraft; it was structured as a fixed-price incentive-fee (FPIF) contract with a ceiling price of $529 million, along with provisions for deficiency correction among other operational clauses and performance criteria.

=== Design phase ===
General Dynamics' design team was led by Robert H. Widmer. Recognizing its lack of experience with carrier-based fighters, General Dynamics teamed with Grumman in November 1963 for the assembly and testing of the F-111B. In addition, Grumman would also build the aft fuselage and the landing gear of the F-111A. The General Dynamics and Grumman team faced ambitious requirements for range, weapons load, and aircraft weight. Thus, the F-111 was designed to incorporate numerous features that were new to production military aircraft, such as variable-geometry wings and afterburning turbofan engines. This use of unfamiliar features has been attributed as a major cause of the aircraft's protracted development and weight increases.

The F-111A and F-111B shared the same airframe structural components and Pratt & Whitney TF30-P-1 turbofan engines. They featured side-by-side crew seating in an escape capsule as required by the Navy. The F-111B's nose was 8.5 ft (2.59 m) shorter as the aircraft could fit on existing carrier elevator decks, and had 3.5-foot-longer (1.07 m) wingtips to improve on-station endurance time; it also carried an AN/AWG-9 pulse-Doppler radar to guide its AIM-54 Phoenix missiles. The USAF's F-111A would be equipped with the AN/APQ-113 attack radar and the AN/APQ-110 terrain-following radar and air-to-ground armament.

During September 1963, the F-111A mockup was inspected. On 15 October 1964, the first test F-111A was rolled out of Plant 4 of General Dynamics' facility in Fort Worth, Texas; it was powered by YTF30-P-1 turbofans and used a set of ejector seats, as the escape capsule was not yet available. On 21 December 1964, the F-111A made its first flight from Carswell Air Force Base, Texas. Lasting for 22 minutes, less than planned due to a flap malfunction, this initial flight was considered to be satisfactory overall; category I testing commenced immediately thereafter. Early flights of the F-111, which included supersonic flights, demonstrated favorably simplistic maintenance requirements, among other qualities.

Various changes to the program were enacted throughout 1965; this was chiefly in response to a steep climb in unit costs from $4.5 million to $6 million. The cause of the cost increases had been attributed, at least partially, to a directive issued to General Dynamics to incorporate improved avionics, as well as to work on strategic bomber and aerial reconnaissance variants of the aircraft, the latter of which was eventually cancelled. During April 1965, General Dynamics was authorized to produce 431 F-111s, less than half the number of aircraft that had originally been forecast. On 10 May 1967, a new, multiyear FPIP contract replaced the prior procurement process, increasing the total aircraft on order to 493 F-111s of multiple models, including 23 F-111Bs intended for the US Navy, 24 F-111Cs for the Royal Australian Air Force, and 50 F-111Ks intended for the Royal Air Force.

Early flights of the F-111 were troubled by compressor surges and stalls across certain portions of the flight regimen. General Dynamics had elected to use an uncommon, spike-shaped, variable intake for the engine for the performance. Studies performed by NASA, the USAF, and General Dynamics led to the engine inlet being redesigned; modifications were implemented between 1965 and 1966, culminating with the "Triple Plow I" and "Triple Plow II" designs. During February 1965, the F-111A achieved a speed of Mach 1.3 while flying with an interim intake design. On 18 May 1965, the F-111B made its first flight; it was also equipped with ejector seats initially.

Separately, cracks in the F-111's wing attachment points were first discovered in 1968 during ground fatigue testing; during the following year, the crash of an F-111 was attributed to a cracked wingbox. On 22 December 1969, the USAF opted to ground the fleet due to this issue, save for those involved in flight testing. The resolution involved the redesigning of the attachment structure and necessitated testing to ensure adequate design and workmanship. On 31 July 1970, the grounding was lifted. Category I flight testing of the F-111A, which had started in 1964, continued through to 31 March 1972. Category II tests started in January 1966, while Category III testing was repeatedly postponed before being cancelled, having been deemed to be unnecessary.

During 1968, the F-111B was cancelled by the Navy on account of weight and performance issues together with revised tactical requirements. Australia would procure its own model, the F-111C. Subsequently, the improved F-111E, F-111D, and F-111F models were developed for the USAF. The strategic bomber FB-111A and the EF-111 electronic-warfare versions were later developed for the USAF. Production of the F-111 ended in 1976, following the completion of 563 aircraft.

== Design ==
=== Overview ===
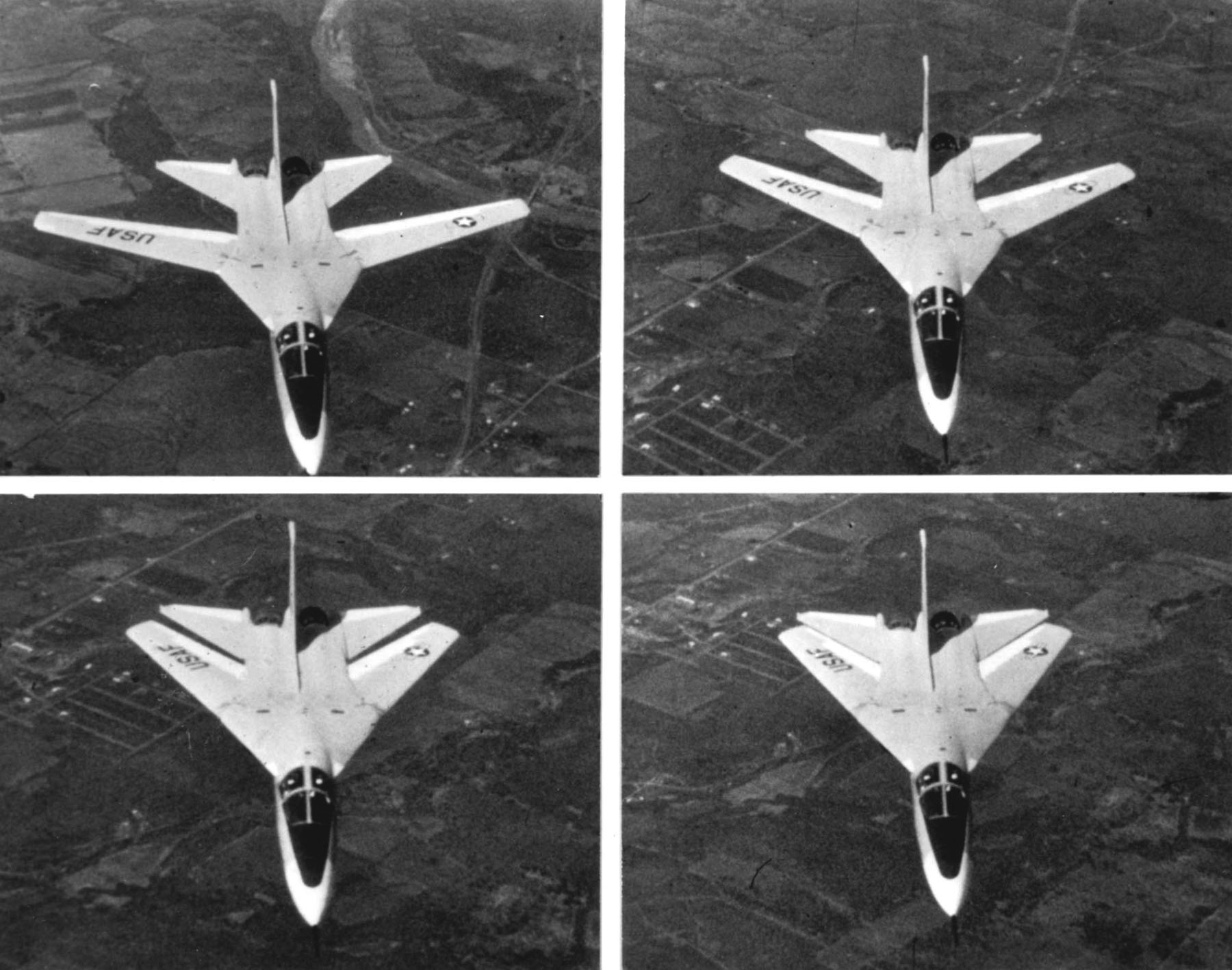
Four-photo series showing the F-111A wing sweep sequence

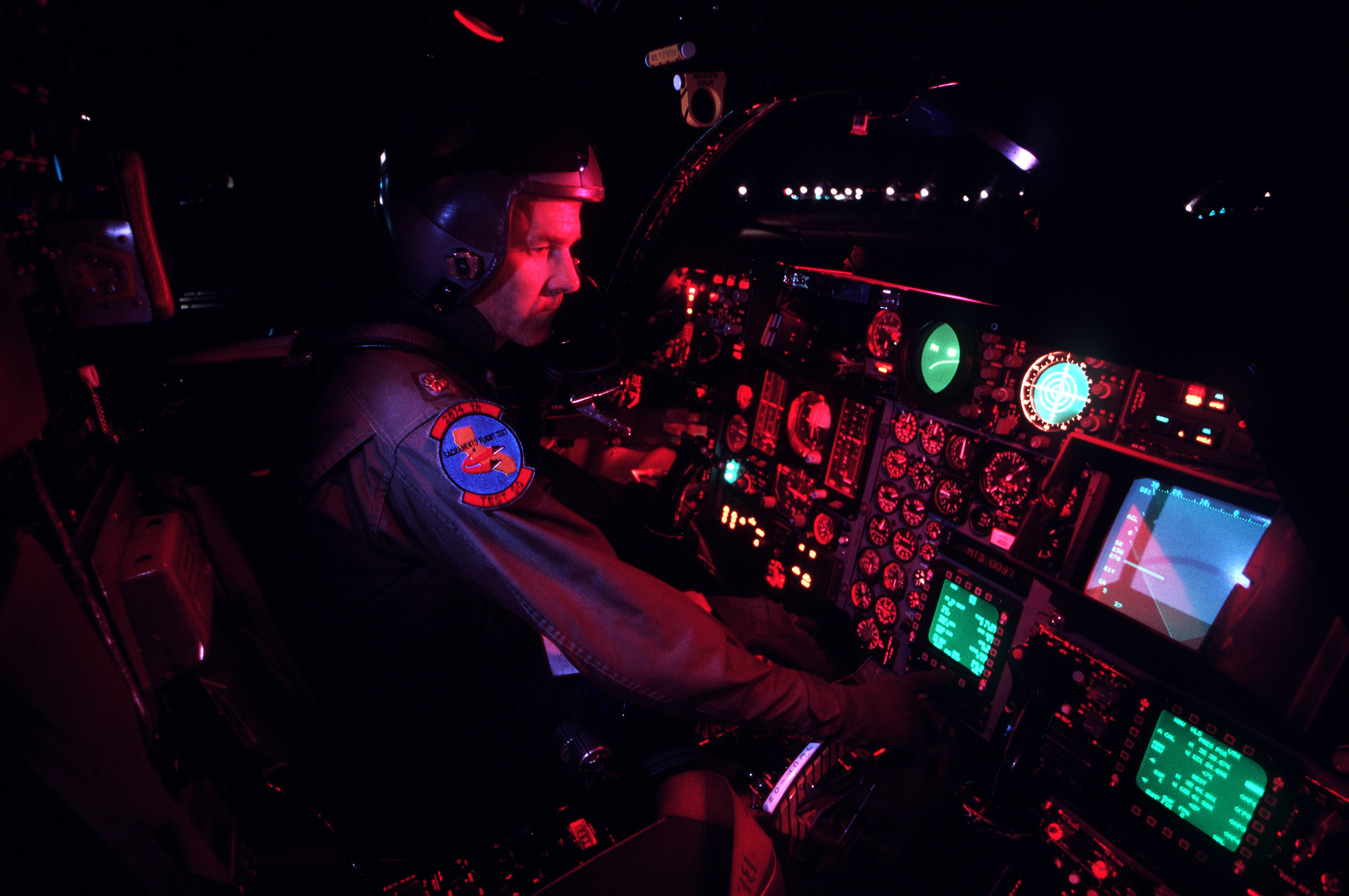
F-111 cockpit before a night flight

The F-111 was an all-weather attack aircraft, capable of low-level penetration of enemy defenses to deliver ordnance on the target. The F-111 featured variable-geometry wings, an internal weapons bay, and a cockpit with side-by-side seating. The cockpit was part of an escape crew capsule. The wing sweep varied between 16 and 72.5° (full forward to full sweep). The wing included leading-edge slats and double-slotted flaps over its full length. The airframe was made up mostly of aluminum alloys with steel, titanium, and other materials used in places. The fuselage was made of a semimonocoque structure with stiffened panels and honeycomb structure panels for skin. The horizontal stabilizer was an all-moving stabilator.

The F-111 used a three-point landing-gear arrangement, with a two-wheel nose gear and two single-wheel main landing-gear units. The landing-gear door for the main gear, which was positioned in the center of the fuselage, also served as a speed brake in flight. Most F-111 variants included a terrain-following radar system connected to the autopilot. The aircraft was powered by two Pratt and Whitney TF30 afterburning turbofan engines. The F-111's variable-geometry wings, escape capsule, terrain-following radar, and afterburning turbofans were new technologies for production aircraft.

=== Armament ===
The armament included a 20 mm cannon and 5,000 lb of bombs internal; added pylons could carry up to 25,000 lb of bombs or two nuclear weapons internal and four AGM-69 SRAM nuclear weapons external.

==== Weapons bay ====
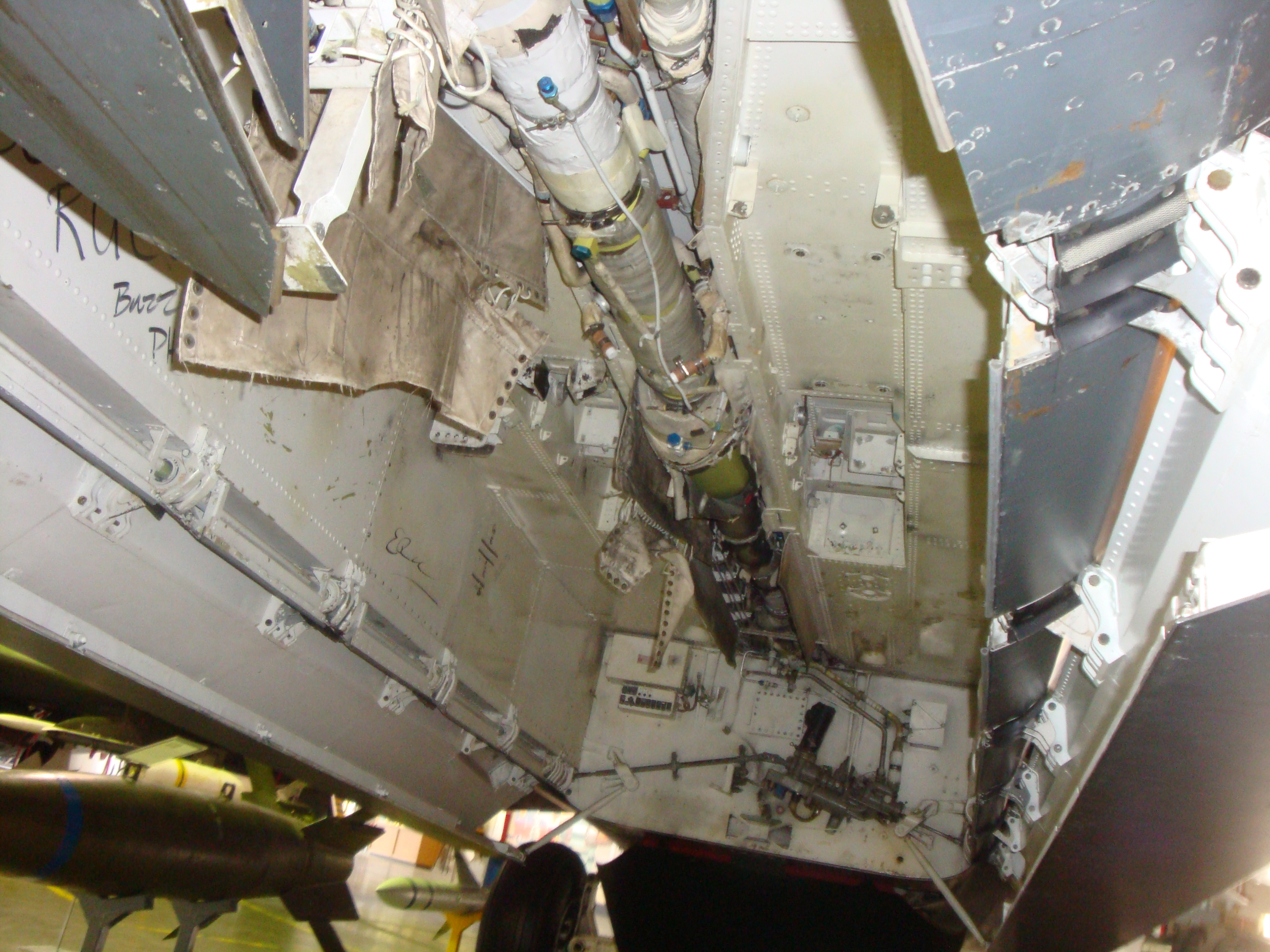
FB-111A Weapons bay

The F-111 featured an internal weapons bay that could carry bombs, a removable 20 mm M61 cannon, or auxiliary fuel tanks. For bombs, the bay could hold two 750 lb (340 kg) M117 conventional bombs, one nuclear bomb, or practice bombs. The F-111B for the US Navy was to carry two AIM-54 Phoenix long-range air-to-air missiles in the bay. The cannon had a large, 2,084-round ammunition tank, and its muzzle was covered by a fairing; however, it was rarely fitted on F-111s.

The F-111C and F-111F were equipped to carry the AN/AVQ-26 Pave Tack targeting system on a rotating carriage that kept the pod protected within the weapons bay when not in use. Pave Tack featured a forward-looking infrared sensor, optical camera, and laser rangefinder/designator. The Pave Tack pod allowed the F-111 to designate targets and drop laser-guided bombs on them. Australian RF-111Cs carried a pallet of sensors and cameras for aerial reconnaissance use.

The FB-111 could carry two AGM-69 SRAM air-to-surface, nuclear missiles in its weapons bay. General Dynamics tested an arrangement with two AIM-9 Sidewinder air-to-air missiles carried on rails in a trapeze arrangement from the bay, but this was not adopted. Early F-111 models had radars equipped to guide the AIM-7 Sparrow medium-range, air-to-air missile, but it was never fitted.

==== External ordnance ====
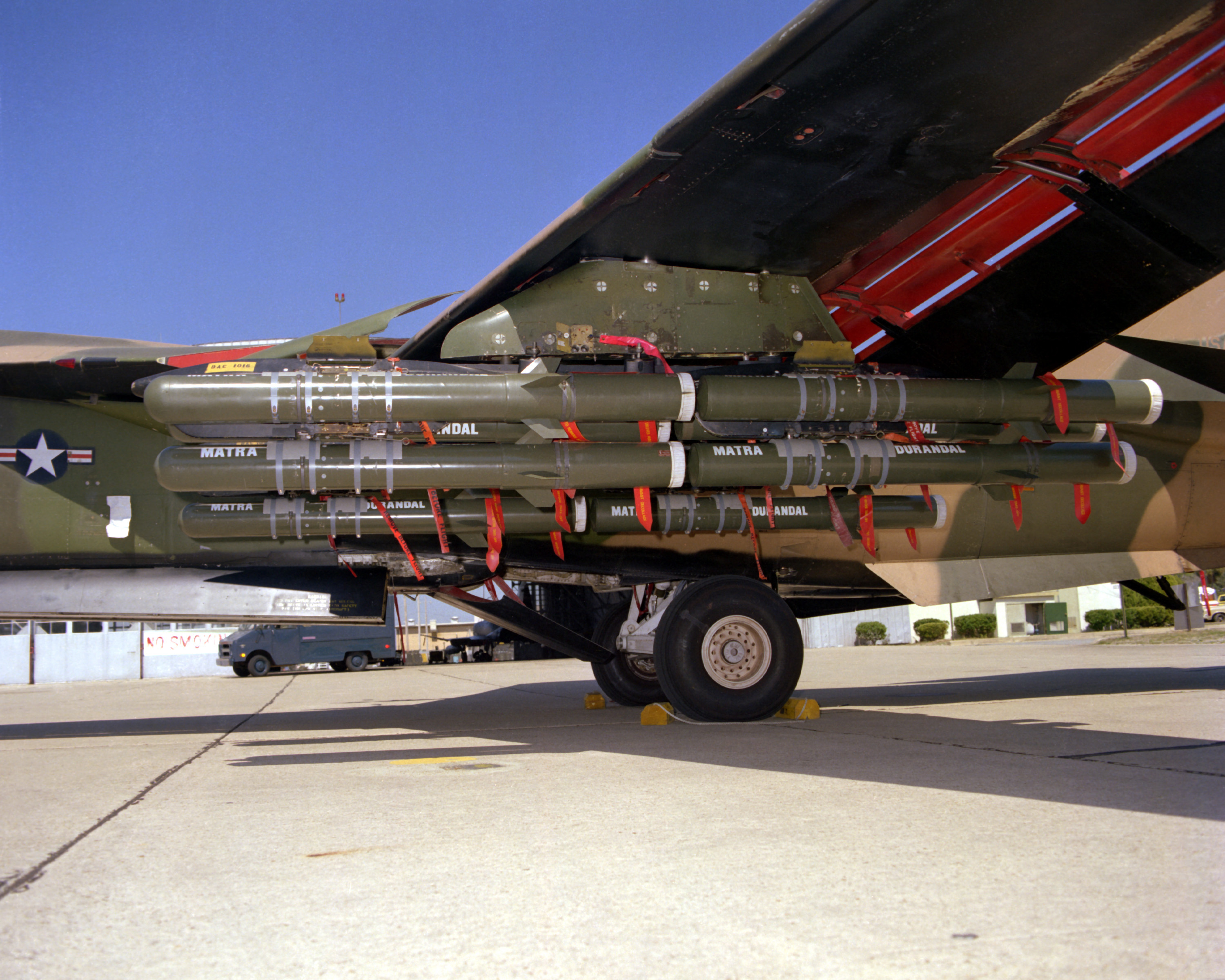
F-111 external payload of Matra Durandal concrete-penetration bombs

Each wing was equipped with four underwing pylons. The inner two pylons on each wing rotated to align with the fuselage, while the outer two were fixed. Each pylon had a capacity of 5,000 lb (2,300 kg). Various bombs and missiles could be carried on the pylons. Auxiliary fuel drop tanks with 600 US gal (2,300 L) capacity each could be fitted.

The design of the F-111's fuselage prevented the carriage of external weapons under the fuselage, but two stations were available on the underside for electronic countermeasures pods or datalink pods; one station was on the weapons bay, and the other was on the rear fuselage between the engines. The F-111's maximum practical weapons load was limited, since the fixed pylons could not be used with the wings fully swept.

Tactical F-111s were fitted with shoulder rails on the four inner swiveling pylons to mount AIM-9 Sidewinder air-to-air missiles for self-defense. Australian F-111Cs were equipped to launch the Harpoon antiship missile, and the Popeye stand-off missile. FB-111As could carry the same conventional ordnance as the tactical variants, but their wing pylons were more commonly used for either fuel tanks or strategic nuclear gravity bombs. They could carry up to four AGM-69 SRAM nuclear missiles on the pylons.

=== Historical significance ===
The F-111 was the first production variable-geometry wing aircraft. Several other types have followed with similar swing-wing configuration, including the Soviet Sukhoi Su-17 "Fitter" (1965), Mikoyan-Gurevich MiG-23 "Flogger" (1967), Tupolev Tu-22M "Backfire" (1969), Sukhoi Su-24 "Fencer" (1970), and Tupolev Tu-160 "Blackjack" (1981); the US Rockwell B-1 Lancer bomber (1974); and the European Panavia Tornado (1974). The Sukhoi Su-24 was very similar to the F-111. The US Navy's role intended for the F-111B was instead filled by another variable-geometry design, the Grumman F-14 Tomcat.

== Operational history ==
=== US Air Force ===
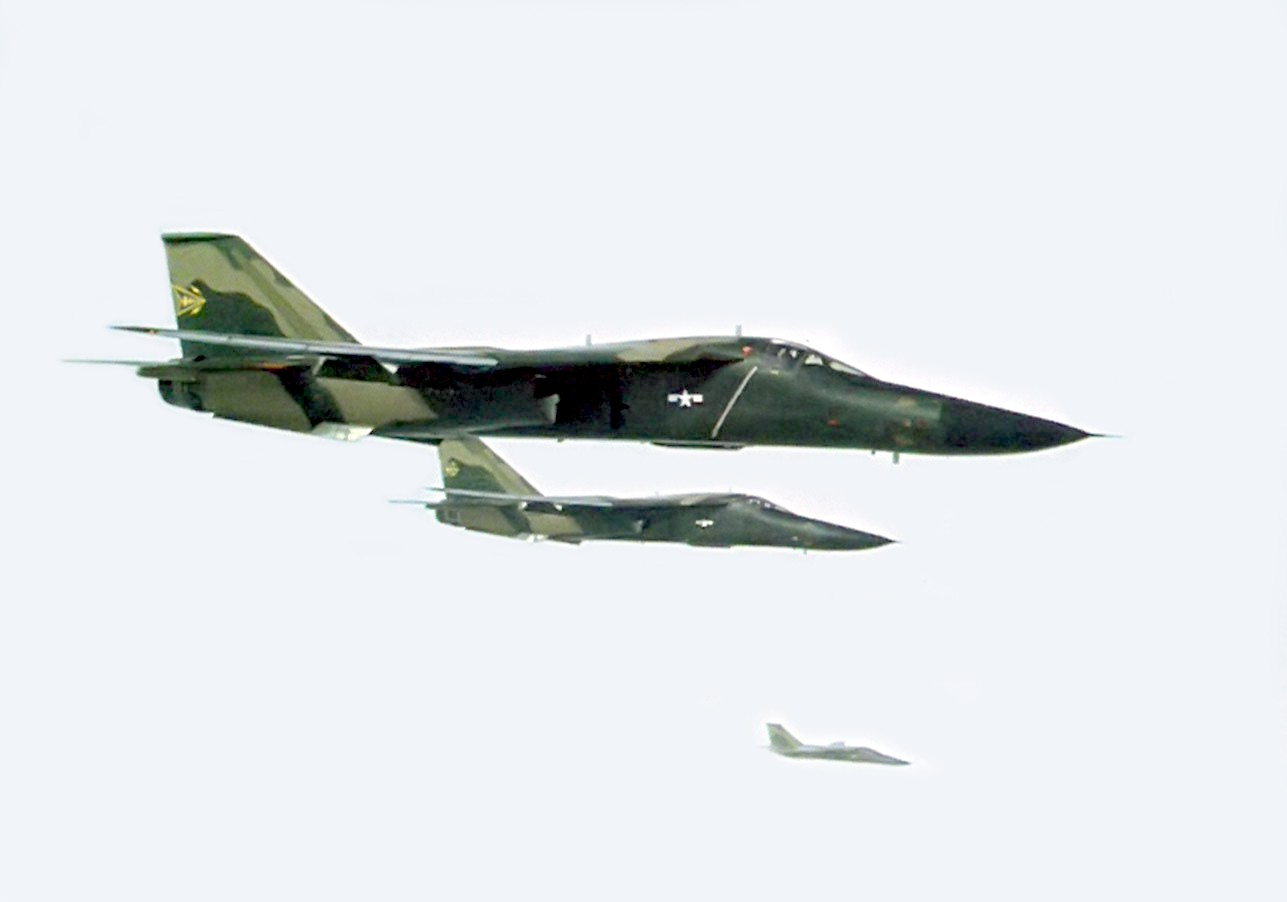
Combat Lancer F-111As over Southeast Asia in 1968

The first of six initial-production F-111s was delivered on 17 July 1967 to fighter squadrons at Nellis Air Force Base. These aircraft were used for crew training. The 428th Tactical Fighter Squadron achieved initial operational capability on 28 April 1968.

After early testing, a detachment of six aircraft from the 474th Tactical Fighter Wing (Roadrunners) were sent in March 1968 to Southeast Asia for Combat Lancer testing in real combat conditions in the Vietnam War. During the deployment, 55 night missions were flown against targets in North Vietnam, but two aircraft had been lost; 66–0022 was lost on 28 March, and 66-0017 on 30 March. Replacement aircraft left Nellis, but the loss of a third F-111A (66-0024) on 22 April halted F-111A combat operations. The squadron returned to the United States in November. The cause of the first two losses is unknown, as the wreckages were never recovered. The third loss was traced to a failure of a hydraulic control-valve rod for the horizontal stabilizer, which caused the aircraft to pitch up uncontrollably. Further inspection of the remaining fleet of F-111As revealed 42 aircraft with the same potential failures. This failure could also have contributed to the two earlier losses had the failure caused a pitch down while at low altitude. The 474 TFW was not fully operational until 1971.

The word aardvark is Afrikaans for "earthpig" and reflects the look of the long nose of the aircraft that might remind one of the nose of the aardvark. The origin of the name has been attributed to F-111A Instructor Pilot Al Mateczun in 1969, as the aircraft had not received an official USAF name.

During September 1972, the F-111 returned to Southeast Asia, stationed at Takhli Air Base, Thailand. F-111As from Nellis AFB participated in the final month of Operation Linebacker and later flew 154 low-level missions in the Operation Linebacker II aerial offensive against the North Vietnamese, who called the aircraft "Whispering Death". They also supported regional aerial operations against other communist forces such as Operation Phou Phiang III during the Laotian Civil War. Crews described their flying in Vietnam as "speed is life", "one pass, haul ass", and "you do more than one pass in a target area you die". The F-111's ability with terrain-following radar ("the best in the fighter world", according to F-111 pilot Richard Crandall) to fly as low as 200 ft (60 m) above ground level at 480 knots (890 km/h) or faster in most weather conditions made it very effective; missions did not require tankers or ECM support, and they could operate in weather that grounded most other aircraft. One F-111 could carry the bomb load of four McDonnell Douglas F-4 Phantom IIs. The worth of the new aircraft was beginning to show: F-111s flew more than 4,000 combat missions in Vietnam with only six combat losses.

From 30 July 1973, F-111As of the 347th Tactical Fighter Wing (347th TFW) were stationed at Takhli Air Base. The 347th TFW conducted bombing missions in Cambodia in support of Khmer Republic forces until 15 August 1973, when US combat support ceased in accordance with the Case–Church Amendment. The 347th TFW was stationed at Korat Royal Thai Air Force Base from 12 July 1974 until 30 June 1975. In May 1975, 347th TFW F-111s provided air support during the Mayaguez incident.

One of the most unusual missions occurred on 14 February 1986, when two FB-111s of the 509th Bombardment Wing were dispatched from then Pease Air Force Base, New Hampshire, to Tinker Air Force Base, Oklahoma, to pick up a heart for transplant. The aircraft landed at Bradley International Airport to deliver the organ to a waiting helicopter.

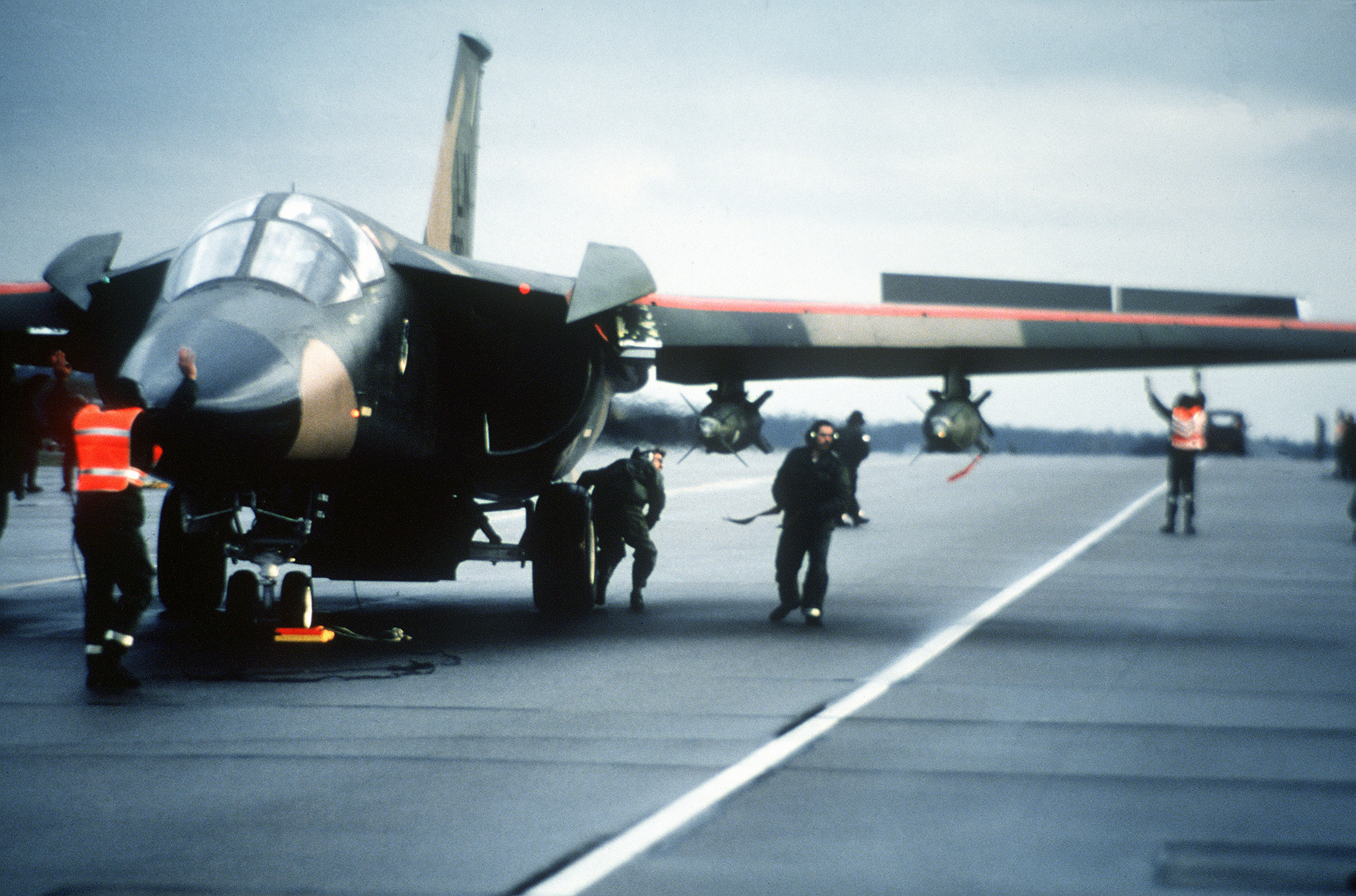
Ground crew prepares an F-111F of the 48th Tactical Fighter Wing for a retaliatory air strike on Libya

On 14 April 1986, 18 F-111s and about 25 Navy aircraft conducted air strikes against Libya under Operation El Dorado Canyon. The 18 F-111s of the 48th Tactical Fighter Wing and four EF-111As from the 20th Tactical Fighter Wing flew what turned out to be the longest fighter combat mission in history. The round-trip flight between RAF Lakenheath/RAF Upper Heyford, United Kingdom, and Libya of 6,400 mi (10,300 km) spanned 13 hours. One F-111 was lost over Libya and crashed into the Mediterranean Sea, probably shot down.

F-111s participated in the Gulf War (Operation Desert Storm) in 1991. During Desert Storm, F-111Fs completed 3.2 successful strike missions for every unsuccessful one, better than any other US strike aircraft used in the operation. The group of 66 F-111Fs dropped almost 80% of the war's laser-guided bombs, including the penetrating bunker-buster GBU-28. Eighteen F-111Es were also deployed during the operation. The US Air Force credited F-111s with destroying more than 1,500 Iraqi tanks and armored vehicles. Their use in the anti-armor role was dubbed "tank plinking".

Though expensive to operate (Crandall said that the aircraft "was nine percent of Tactical Air Command's fleet, but ate up a whopping 25 percent of the maintenance budget"), the F-111 (Note: The F-111 was the only aircraft in USAF history to never have an official name while in service.) was in service with the USAF from 1967 through 1998. The FB-111s were operated by SAC from 1969 before conversion to F-111G and transferred to Air Combat Command until their retirement in 1993. At a ceremony marking the F-111's USAF retirement, on 27 July 1996, it was officially named Aardvark, its long-standing unofficial name. The USAF retired the EF-111 electronic-warfare variant in 1998.

=== Royal Australian Air Force ===
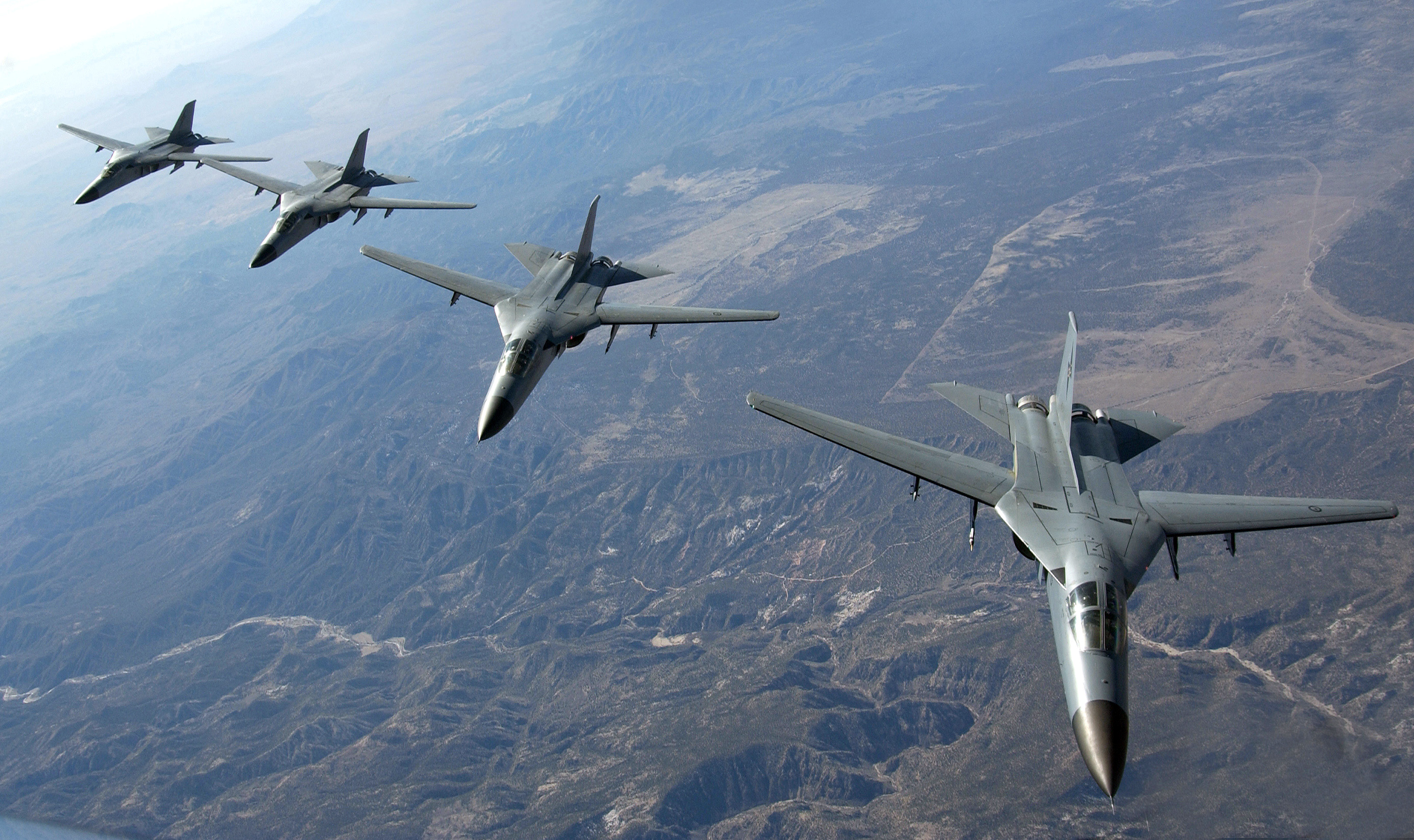
Four Australian F-111s flying towards Nellis Air Force Base after a refueling exercise during Exercise Red Flag 2006

The Australian government ordered 24 F-111C aircraft to replace the RAAF's English Electric Canberras in the bombing and tactical-strike role. While the first aircraft was officially handed over in September 1968, structural issues delayed the entry into service. The first F-111C was accepted at Nellis Air Force Base on 15 March 1973. The RAAF's first six F-111Cs arrived at RAAF Base Amberley on 1 July 1973, and three subsequent flights of six F-111s arrived on 27 July, 28 September, and 4 December. F-111Cs were allocated to No. 1 Squadron and No. 6 Squadron, under the control of No. 82 Wing. In Australia, the F-111 was affectionately known as the "Pig" from the translation of the Afrikaans word for aardvark, "earth pig".

The purchase proved to be highly successful for the RAAF. Although it never saw combat, the F-111C was the fastest, longest-ranged combat aircraft in Southeast Asia, providing Australia with independent strike capability. Benny Murdani told Kim Beazley that when others became upset with Australia during Indonesian cabinet meetings, Murdani told them, "Do you realise the Australians have a bomber that can put a bomb through that window on to the table here in front of us?"

Australian F-111s were ready to attack Indonesian forces during the establishment of East Timor's independence and the deployment of the Australian-led International Force for East Timor. In 2006, an RAAF F-111 scuttled the North Korean ship Pong Su with two GBU-10 bombs.

Because of the high maintenance time required for every flight hour, the F-111's retirement began with the F-111G models operated by No. 6 Squadron in late 2007. Twenty-four Boeing F/A-18E/F Super Hornets were procured as an interim replacement as the Lockheed Martin F-35 Lightning II program was delayed. The last F-111s were retired on 3 December 2010.

== Variants ==
=== F-111A ===
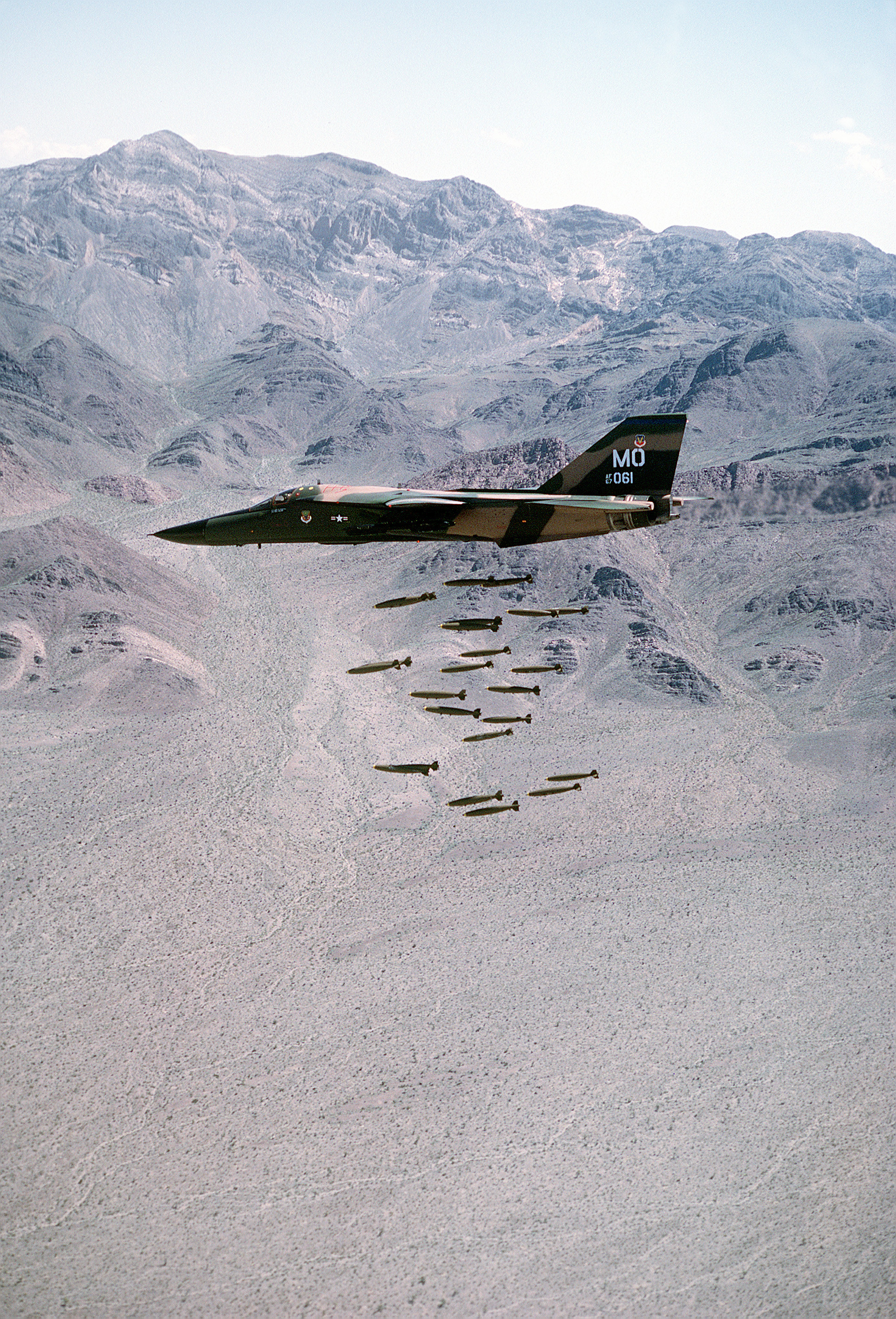
An F-111A drops 24 Mark 82 low-drag bombs in-flight over a bombing range.

The F-111A was the initial production version of the F-111. Early A-models used the TF30-P-1 engine. Most A-models used the TF30-P-3 engine with 12,000 lbf (53 kN) dry and 18,500 lbf (82 kN) afterburning thrust and "Triple Plow I" variable intakes, providing a maximum speed of Mach 2.3 (1,450 mph, 2,300 km/h) at altitude. The variant had a maximum takeoff weight of 92,500 lb (42,000 kg) and an empty weight of 45,200 lb (20,500 kg).

The F-111A's Mark I avionics suite included the General Electric AN/APQ-113 attack radar mated to a separate Texas Instruments AN/APQ-110 terrain-following radar lower in the nose and a Litton AJQ-20 inertial navigation and nav/attack system. The terrain-following radar (TFR) was integrated into the automatic flight control system, allowing for "hands-off" flight at high speeds and low levels (down to 200 ft or 61 m).

A total of 159 F-111As was produced, including 30 preproduction aircraft that were rebuilt to production standards. Forty-two F-111As were converted to EF-111 Ravens for an electronic warfare tactical electronic-jamming role. In 1982, four surviving F-111As were provided to Australia as attrition replacements and modified to F-111C standard, including its longer-span wings and reinforced landing gear. Three preproduction F-111As were used by NASA for various tests. The 13th F-111A received new wing designs for the Transonic Aircraft Technology and Advanced Fighter Technology Integration programs in the 1970s and 1980s. It retired to the United States Air Force Museum at Wright-Patterson Air Force Base in 1989. Unconverted F-111As were mothballed at Aerospace Maintenance and Regeneration Center at Davis-Monthan Air Force Base in June 1991.

=== F-111B ===
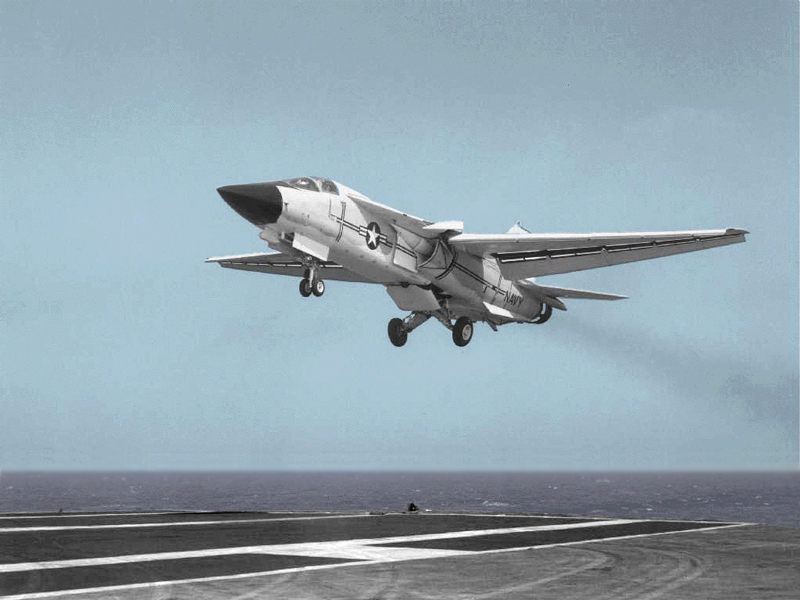
A US Navy F-111B approaching the aircraft carrier USS Coral Sea during trials in 1968

The F-111B was to be a fleet air defense (FAD) fighter for the US Navy, fulfilling a requirement for a carrier-based fighter aircraft armed with heavy, long-range missiles to defend aircraft carriers and their battle groups from Soviet bombers and fighter-bombers equipped with antiship missiles. General Dynamics, lacking experience with carrier-based aircraft, partnered with Grumman for this version. Seven F-111Bs were completed for testing, but they never entered fleet service. This version had a troubled development, and Navy requirements changed to a maneuverable aircraft for dogfighting. The swing-wing configuration, TF-30 engines, AIM-54 Phoenix air-to-air missiles, and AWG-9 radar developed for the F-111B were used on its replacement, the Grumman F-14 Tomcat. The Tomcat was large enough to carry the AWG-9 and Phoenix missiles while exceeding both the F-111's and the F-4's maneuverability.

=== F-111C ===
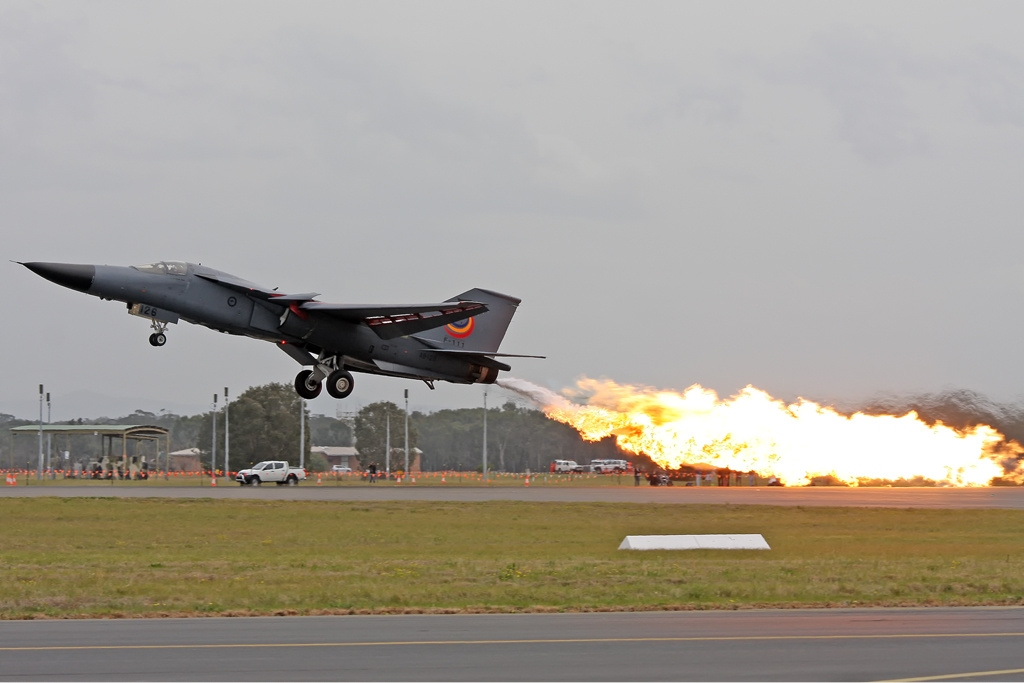
A Royal Australian Air Force F-111C performing a dump-and-burn, a procedure where fuel is intentionally ignited using the aircraft's afterburner

The F-111C is the export version for Australia, combining the F-111A with longer F-111B wings and strengthened FB-111A landing gear. Australia ordered 24 F-111s, and following delays, the Royal Australian Air Force accepted the aircraft in 1973. Four were converted to the RF-111C reconnaissance variant in 1979–80. Australia also purchased four ex-USAF F-111As and converted them into F-111Cs.

In the 1990s, the F-111C underwent a comprehensive digital avionics upgrade program (AUP) which introduced new nav/attack systems (PAVE TACK Laser/infrared targeting system) and digital flight control computers. Later, the C model was upgraded with a unique version of the TF-30 engine known as the P-108. This local version mated the P-109 engine to a P-107 afterburner, delivering 20,840 lbf (92.7 kN) of thrust and significantly increased reliability. The RAAF retired its last F-111Cs in December 2010 after 37 years of service.

=== F-111D ===
The F-111D was an upgraded F-111A equipped with newer Mark II avionics, more powerful engines, improved intake geometry, and an early glass cockpit. It was to integrate a longer range air-to-air missile in the form of the AIM-7G, but it was canceled in 1970. F-111D was first ordered in 1967 and delivered from 1970–73 after delays due to avionics issues. The D-model reached initial operational capability in 1972; the sole operator was the 27th TFW stationed at Cannon AFB, New Mexico. 96 were built.

The F-111D used the new Triple Plow II intakes, which were located four inches (100 mm) further away from the airframe to prevent engine ingestion of the sluggish boundary layer air that was known to cause stalls in the TF30 turbofans. It had more powerful TF30-P-9 engines with 12,000 lbf (53 kN) dry and 18,500 lbf (82 kN) afterburning thrust.

The Mark II avionics used digitally integrated microprocessors, some of the first used by the USAF, offering new capability but substantial problems. The Rockwell Autonetics digital bombing-navigation system included an inertial navigation system, AN/APQ-130 attack radar system, Doppler radar, digital computer set, and multi-function displays (MFDs). The terrain-following radar was the Sperry AN/APQ-128. The attack radar featured a Doppler beam-sharpening, moving target indication (MTI), and Continuous-wave radar for guiding semi-active radar homing missiles. Avionics reliability improved but some issues were never fully resolved; according to Crandall, "The truth is that the D model didn't work. They parked every single one of them in Fort Worth for several years as they worked to fix the bugs". The F-111D was withdrawn from service in 1991 and 1992.

=== F-111E ===
A simplified, interim variant ordered after the F-111D was delayed, the F-111E used the Triple Plow II intakes, but retained the F-111A's TF30-P-3 engines and Mark I avionics. The weapon stores management system was improved and other small changes made. Crandall described the F-111E as "all analog, just like the A model, but It worked".

The F-111E was first ordered in 1968. Its first flight occurred on 20 August 1969 and achieved initial operational capability late that year. 94 F-111Es were delivered between 1969 and 1971. Many F-111Es were assigned to the 20th TFW at Upper Heyford, UK until 1991. It saw action during the Gulf War. Some F-111Es received an Avionics Modernization Program and improved TF30-P-109 engines in the early 1990s. All were retired to AMARC by 1995.

=== F-111F ===
The F-111F was the final variant produced for Tactical Air Command, with a modern, but less expensive, Mark IIB avionics system, more powerful TF30-P-100 engine, and strengthened wing carry-through box. Crandall described it as "the Cadillac of the F-111 force". The USAF approved its development in 1969. 106 F-111Fs were produced between 1970 and 1976.

The F-111F could reach Mach 1.2 at sea level on full afterburner. It had the Triple Plow II intakes along with the substantially more powerful TF30-P-100 turbofan with 25,100 lbf (112 kN) afterburning thrust, 35% more thrust than the F-111A and E. An adjustable engine nozzle was added to decrease drag. The P-100 engine greatly improved performance. The engines were upgraded to the TF30-P-109 version between 1985 and 1986.

The F-111F's Mark IIB avionics suite used a simplified version of the FB-111A's AN/APQ-144 radar, which lacked some operating modes but added a new 2.5 mi (4.0 km) display ring. Although tested with digital moving-target indicator (MTI) capacity, it was not used in production sets. The Mark IIB avionics combined some Mark II components with FB-111A components, such as the AN/APQ-146 terrain-following radar. The F-111E's weapon management system was also included. In the early 1980s, the F-111F began to be equipped with the AVQ-26 Pave Tack forward looking infrared (FLIR) and laser designator system, which enabled the use of precision laser-guided munitions and was mounted in the internal weapons bay. The Pacer Strike avionics update program replaced analog equipment with new digital equipment and multi-function displays. The last USAF F-111s were withdrawn from service in 1996, replaced by the McDonnell Douglas F-15E Strike Eagle.

=== F-111K ===
The British government canceled the BAC TSR-2 strike aircraft in 1965, citing the lower costs for the TFX and ordered 50 F-111K aircraft in February 1967 for the Royal Air Force. The F-111K was to be supplemented later by the Anglo-French Variable Geometry Aircraft then under development. The F-111K was based on the F-111A with FB-111 landing gear, Mark II navigation/fire control system, and British supplied mission systems. There is confusion around whether the F-111K was to have longer wings but more recent sources have cleared up this and confirmed it was to have standard F-111A wings. Other changes included weapons bay modifications, addition of a centerline pylon, a retractable refueling probe, provisions for a reconnaissance pallet, and a higher gross weight with the use of FB-111A landing gear.

In January 1968, the United Kingdom terminated its F-111K order, citing higher cost; increased costs along with devaluation of the pound had raised the cost to around £3 million each. The first two F-111Ks (one strike/recon F-111K and one trainer/strike TF-111K) were in the final stages of assembly when the order was canceled. All of the components that had been assembled for the production of the main F-111K fleet that shared commonality were diverted to the FB-111A program, while the two aircraft under construction were re-designated as YF-111As with the intention that they be used as test aircraft in the F-111A program. Ultimately however, the two F-111Ks were never operated as test aircraft – in July 1968, almost exactly a year after the first airframe began construction, the USAF decided not to take them over, and General Dynamics were ordered to use them for component recovery.

=== FB-111A / F-111G ===
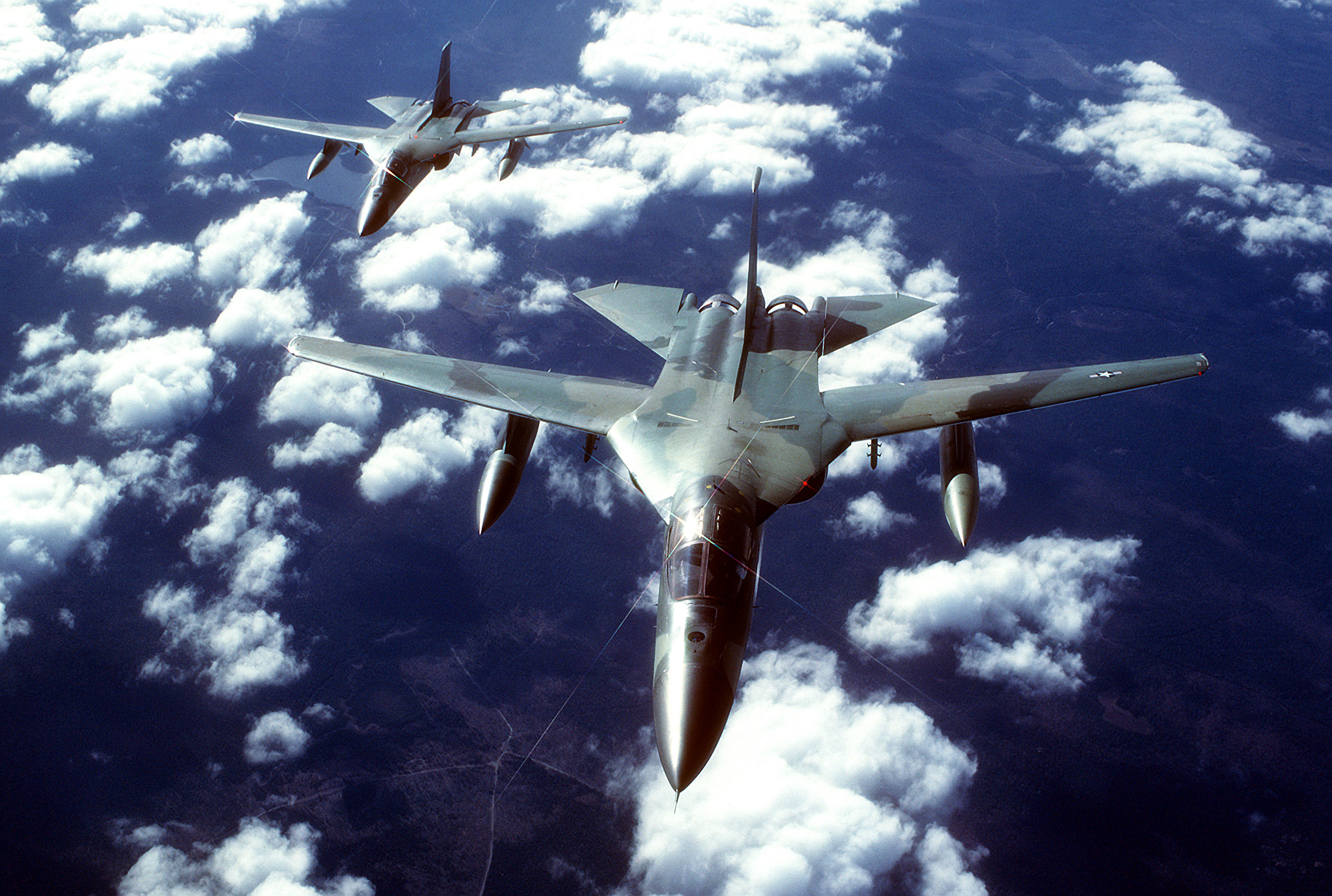
An overhead view of two FB-111s in formation

The FB-111A was a strategic bomber version of the F-111. The USAF's Strategic Air Command needed an interim bomber due to the Advanced Manned Strategic Aircraft program proceeding slowly and the B-52 fleet's fatigue. The FB-111A was selected in 1965 and ordered in 1966 to replace the supersonic Convair B-58 Hustler and early B-52s. In 1968, plans called for 263 FB-111s, but the total was reduced to 76 aircraft in 1969. The first production aircraft flew in 1968. After the UK canceled its order for the F-111K in 1968, components for the 48 F-111Ks in production were reused on the FB-111A. Deliveries began in 1969 and ended in 1971.

The FB-111A had a redesigned aft fuselage, longer F-111B wings for greater range and load-carrying ability, and a maximum speed of Mach 2. Fuel capacity was increased by 585 gallons (2,214 L) and strengthened landing gear permitted a higher maximum takeoff weight of 119,250 lb (54,105 kg). All but the first FB-111A had the Triple Plow II intakes and the TF30-P-7 with 12,500 lbf (56 kN) dry and 20,350 lbf (90 kN) afterburning thrust.

The FB-111A was fitted with the SAC Mark IIB avionics suite. It had an attack radar improved from the F-111A's radar, along with kit later used on the F-111D, such as the inertial navigation system, digital computers, and multi-function displays. The suite also had custom items to support the strategic mission, such as a star tracker navigation system mounted forward of the cockpit, a satellite communications receiver, and an automatic stores release system that replaced the manual arrangement on other F-111 models. Armament for the strategic bombing role was the Boeing AGM-69 SRAM (short-range attack missile); two could be carried in the internal weapons bay and four more on the inner underwing pylons; nuclear gravity bombs were also usable. Fuel tanks were often carried on the third non-swivelling pylon of each wing. The FB-111A had a total weapon load of 35,500 lb (16,100 kg).

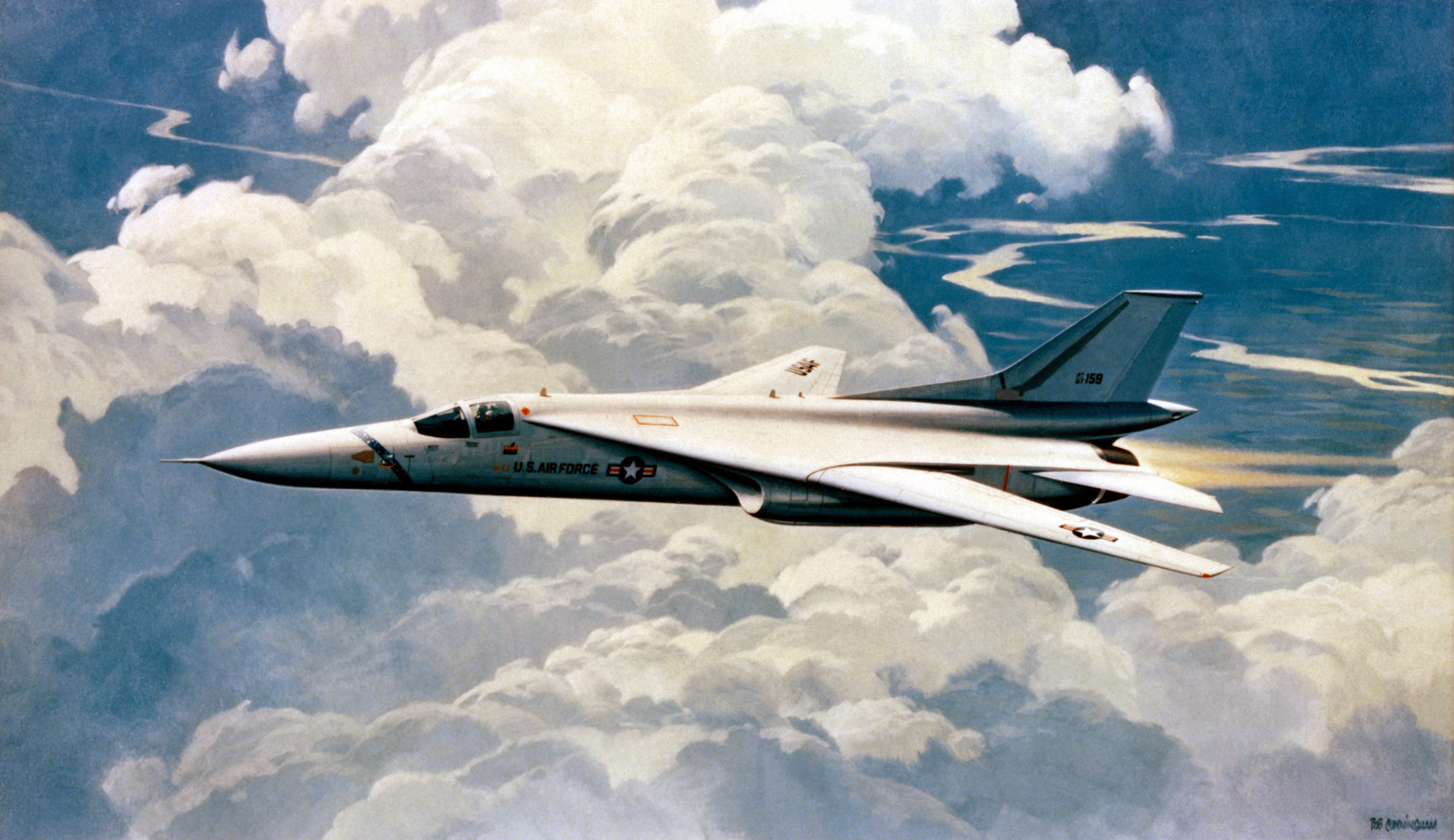
Artist concept of a lengthened FB-111H

Multiple advanced FB-111 strategic bomber proposals were made in the 1970s. The first, referred to as "FB-111G" by General Dynamics, was a larger aircraft with more powerful engines, greater payload and range. The next was a lengthened "FB-111H" fitted with more powerful General Electric F101 turbofan engines (the same as on the Rockwell B-1 Lancer), a 12 ft 8.5 in (3.874 m) longer fuselage and redesigned fixed intakes. The rear landing gear were moved outward so armament could be carried on the fuselage there. The FB-111H was offered as an alternative to the B-1A in 1975. The similar FB-111B/C was offered in 1979 without success.

The FB-111A became surplus to SAC's needs after the B-1B Lancer entered service; they were subsequently reconfigured for tactical use and redesignated F-111G. The conversions began in 1989 and ended after 34 F-111Gs were produced. After SAC's disestablishment, the FB-111As and F-111Gs were transferred to the newly established Air Combat Command (ACC) and used primarily for training. The remaining FB-111As were retired in 1991 and the F-111Gs were retired in 1993. Australia bought 15 F-111Gs in 1993 to supplement its F-111Cs. They were retired in 2007.

=== EF-111A Raven ===
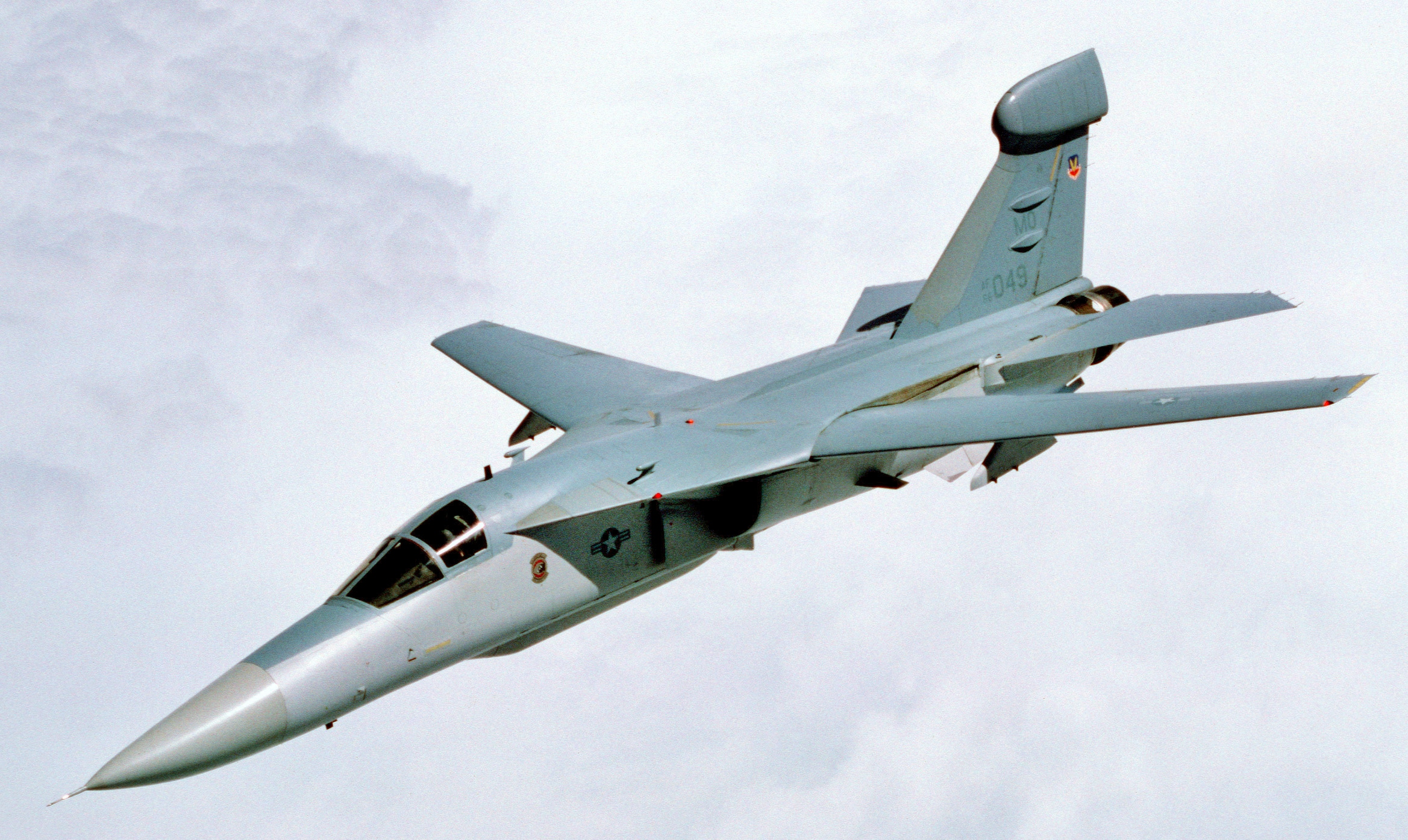
An EF-111A Raven electronic warfare aircraft

To replace the aging Douglas EB-66, the USAF contracted Grumman in 1972 to convert 42 existing F-111As into electronic warfare aircraft. The EF-111A can be distinguished from the F-111A by the equipment bulge atop their tails. In May 1998, the USAF withdrew the final EF-111As from service, placing them in storage at Aerospace Maintenance and Regeneration Center (AMARC) at Davis–Monthan Air Force Base.

== Operators ==
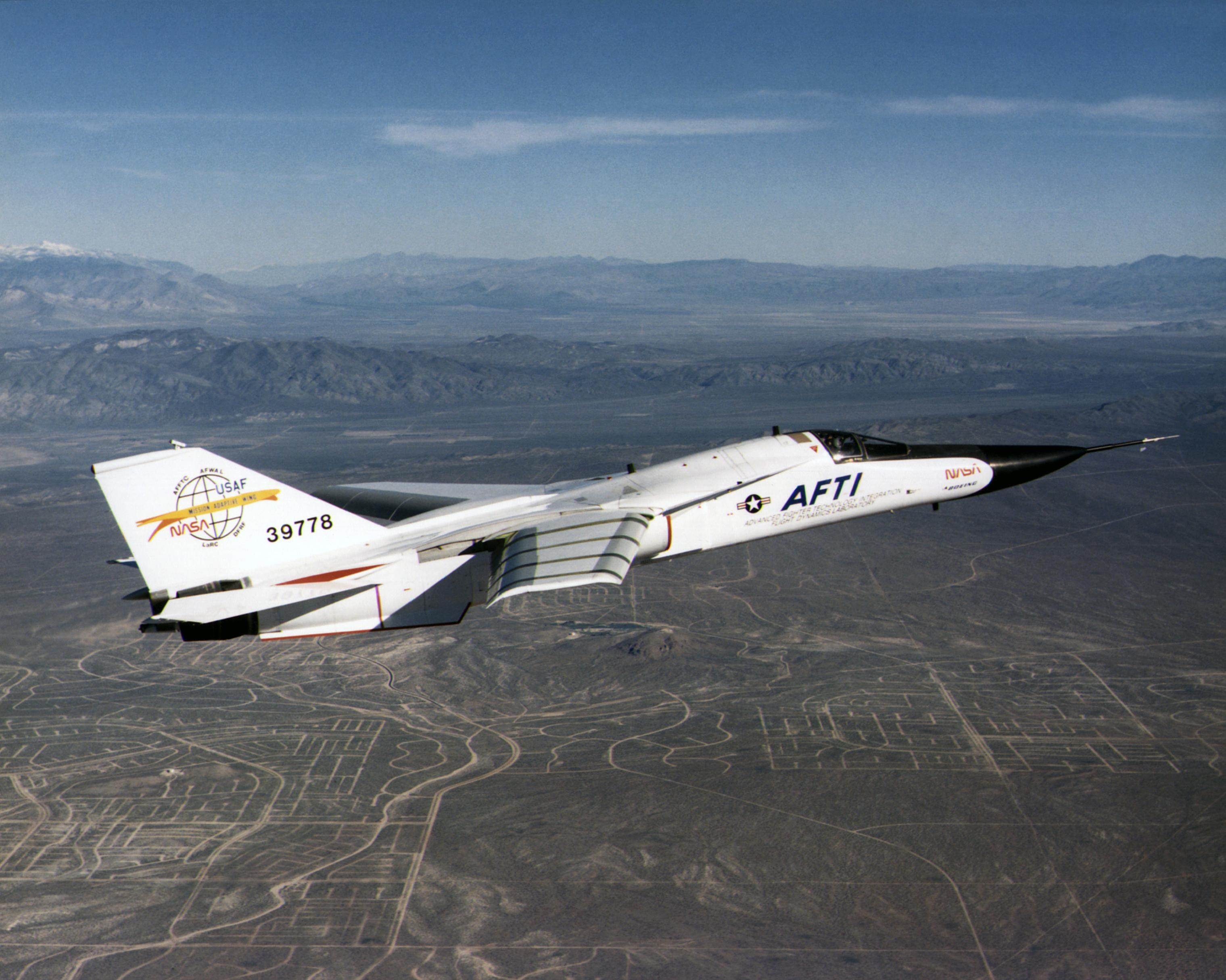
An F-111 operated by NASA

Australia

- Royal Australian Air Force
- No. 82 Wing – RAAF Base Amberley
  - No. 1 Squadron F-111C (1973–2009)
  - No. 6 Squadron F-111C (1973–2010), F-111G (1993–2007)

United States

United States Air Force operated F-111A/D/E/F/G, FB-111A and EF-111A. Officially retired its F-111s in 1996 and the EF-111A in 1998.

Tactical Air Command 1968–1992
Air Combat Command 1992–1998

- 27th Tactical Fighter Wing – Cannon AFB

428th Tactical Fighter Training Squadron F-111G (1990–1993), F-111E (1993–1995)
481st Tactical Fighter Squadron F-111A/E (1969–1973), F-111D (1973–1980)
522d Tactical Fighter Squadron F-111A/E (1971–1972), F-111D (1973–1992), F-111F (1992–1995)
523d Tactical Fighter Squadron F-111A/E (1971–1972), F-111D (1973–1992), F-111F (1992–1995)
524th Tactical Fighter Squadron F-111A/E (1971–1972), F-111D (1973–1992), F-111F (1992–1995)

- 366th Tactical Fighter Wing – Mountain Home AFB

389th Tactical Fighter Squadron F-111F (1971–1977), F-111A (1977–1991)
390th Tactical Fighter Squadron F-111F (1971–1977), F-111A (1977–1982)
391st Tactical Fighter Squadron F-111F (1971–1977), F-111A (1977–1990)

- 474th Tactical Fighter Wing – Nellis AFB

428th Tactical Fighter Squadron F-111A (1968–1977)
429th Tactical Fighter Squadron F-111A (1969–1977)
430th Tactical Fighter Squadron F-111A (1969–1977)
442nd Tactical Fighter Training Squadron F-111A (1969–1977)

United States Air Forces in Europe

- 20th Tactical Fighter Wing – RAF Upper Heyford

55th Tactical Fighter Squadron F-111E (1971–1993)
77th Tactical Fighter Squadron F-111E (1971–1993)
79th Tactical Fighter Squadron F-111E (1971–1993)

- 48th Tactical Fighter Wing – RAF Lakenheath

492d Tactical Fighter Squadron F-111F (1977–1992)
493d Tactical Fighter Squadron F-111F (1977–1992)
494th Tactical Fighter Squadron F-111F (1977–1992)
495th Tactical Fighter Squadron F-111F (1977–1991)

Strategic Air Command

- 340th Bombardment Group (Medium) – Carswell AFB

4007th Combat Crew Training Squadron FB-111 (1968–1971)

- 380th Bombardment Wing (Medium) – Plattsburgh AFB

528th Bombardment Squadron (Medium) FB-111 (1971–1991)
529th Bombardment Squadron (Medium) FB-111 (1971–1991)
530th Combat Crew Training Squadron FB-111 (1986–1991)
4007th Combat Crew Training Squadron FB-111 (1971–1986)

- 509th Bombardment Wing (Medium) – Pease AFB

393d Bombardment Squadron (Medium) FB-111 (1970–1990)
715th Bombardment Squadron (Medium) FB-111 (1971–1990)

- NASA

== Aircraft on display ==
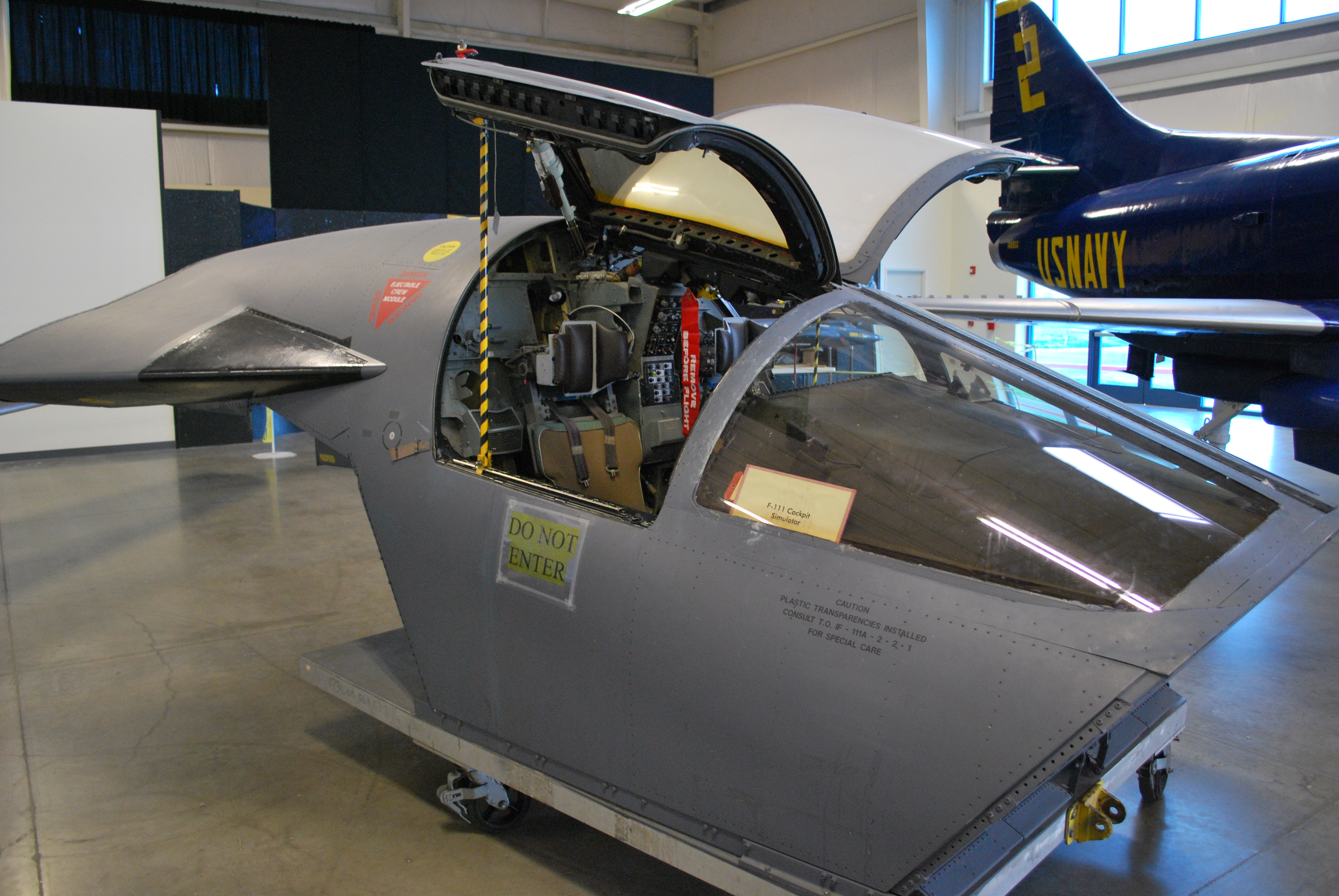
An F-111 escape capsule on display as a cockpit simulator

=== Australia ===
F-111G

- A8-272 – RAAF Museum, Point Cook, Victoria.

=== Russia ===
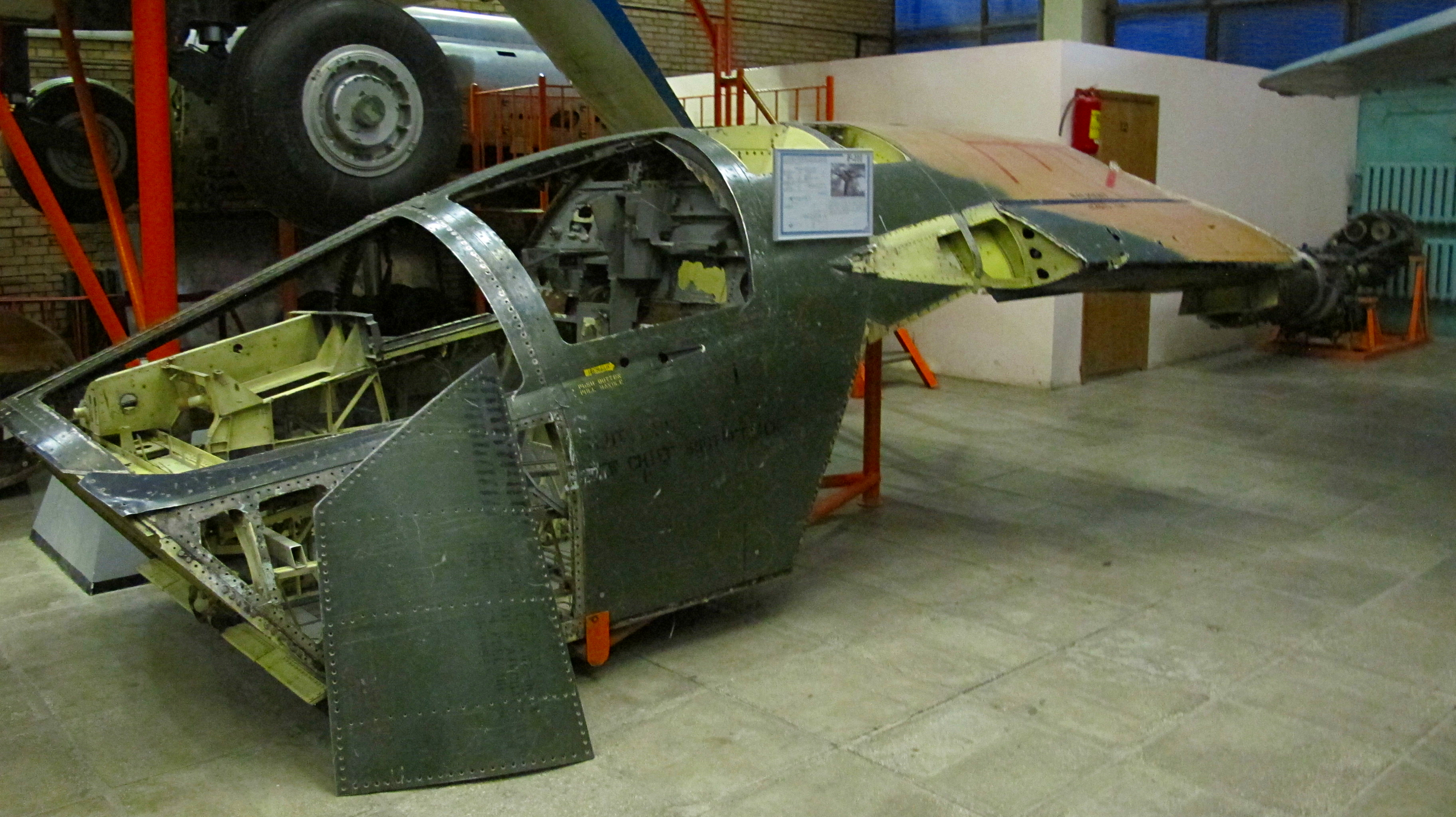
F-111 escape capsule at Museum of Moscow Aviation Institute

F-111A

- 67-0068 – Museum of Moscow Aviation Institute, Moscow (cockpit module only).

=== United Kingdom ===
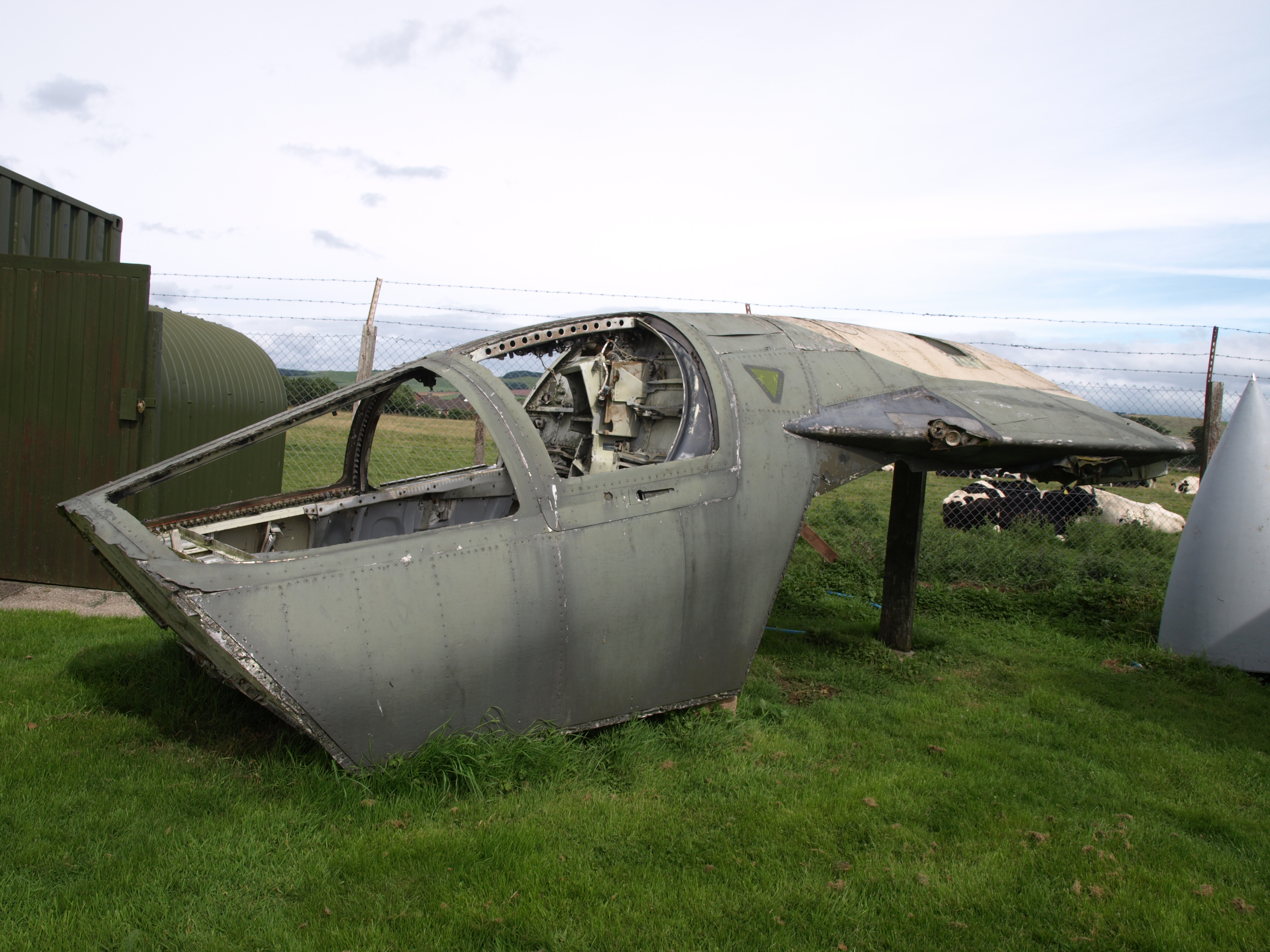
General Dynamics F-111 Aardvark Escape Pod at Dumfries

F-111E

- 67-0120 – American Air Museum, Imperial War Museum Duxford, Duxford, England. The last F-111E from 20th Tactical Fighter Wing in the UK. It was directly transferred from USAF service at RAF Upper Heyford to the museum in late 1993, prior to the base closure in 1994.
- 68-0011 – RAF Lakenheath, England (in front of base post office, marked as 48th TFW F-111F)

F-111F

- 74-0177 – National Cold War Exhibition, Royal Air Force Museum Cosford, England.

=== United States ===
F-111A

- 63-9766 – Air Force Flight Test Center Museum, Edwards AFB, Palmdale, California (first F-111)
- 63-9767 – Waukegan National Airport, Waukegan, Illinois. To be put on display at the Lake County Veterans Memorial at the airport. Formerly on display at Octave Chanute Aerospace Museum (former Chanute AFB), Rantoul, Illinois. Although it is a monument, it is possible to take it down because the wheels are unfolded.
- 63-9771 – Cannon AFB, Clovis, New Mexico. It is a monument fixed to a pedestal.
- 63-9773 – Sheppard AFB Air Park, Sheppard AFB, Wichita Falls, Texas. It is fixed to a pedestal and has become a monument.
- 63-9775 – United States Space and Rocket Center, Huntsville, Alabama.
- 63-9776 – Mountain Home AFB, Idaho (the only RF-111A, marked as 66-0022). It is fixed to a pedestal and has become a monument.
- 63-9778 – Air Force Flight Test Center Museum, Edwards AFB, Palmdale, California (TACT/AFTI F-111)
- 66-0012 – Battle Mountain Air Museum, Battle Mountain, Nevada.
- 66-0016 – Cannon AFB, Clovis, New Mexico. It is a monument fixed to a pedestal.
- 67-0012 – Henderson Park, Brenham, Texas
- 67-0046 – Brownwood Regional Airport, Brownwood, Texas.
- 67-0047 – American Airpower Museum, Long Island, New York
- 67-0051 – Historic Aviation Memorial Museum, Tyler Pounds Regional Airport, Tyler, Texas (marked as 67-0050).
- 67-0057 – Dyess Air Force Base Linear Air Park, Abilene, Texas.
- 67-0058 – Carl Miller Park, Mountain Home, Idaho. It is fixed to a pedestal and serves as a monument.
- 67-0067 – National Museum of the United States Air Force, Wright-Patterson AFB, Dayton, Ohio
- 67-0069 – The Southern Museum of Flight, Birmingham, Alabama.
- 67-0100 – Nellis Air Force Base, North Las Vegas, Nevada (aircraft display park). It is fixed to a pedestal and serves as a monument.

F-111D

- 68-0140 – Clovis, New Mexico (F-111 "Vark" Memorial Park). It is fixed to a pedestal and serves as a monument.

F-111E

- 68-0009 – Fort Worth Aviation Museum Fort Worth, Texas
- 68-0020 – Hill Aerospace Museum, Hill AFB, Utah (nicknamed "My Lucky Blonde")
- 68-0027 – Commemorative Air Force, Midland, Texas.
- 68-0033 – Pima Air and Space Museum (adjacent to Davis-Monthan AFB), Tucson, Arizona
- 68-0039 – Shaw AFB, Sumter, South Carolina.

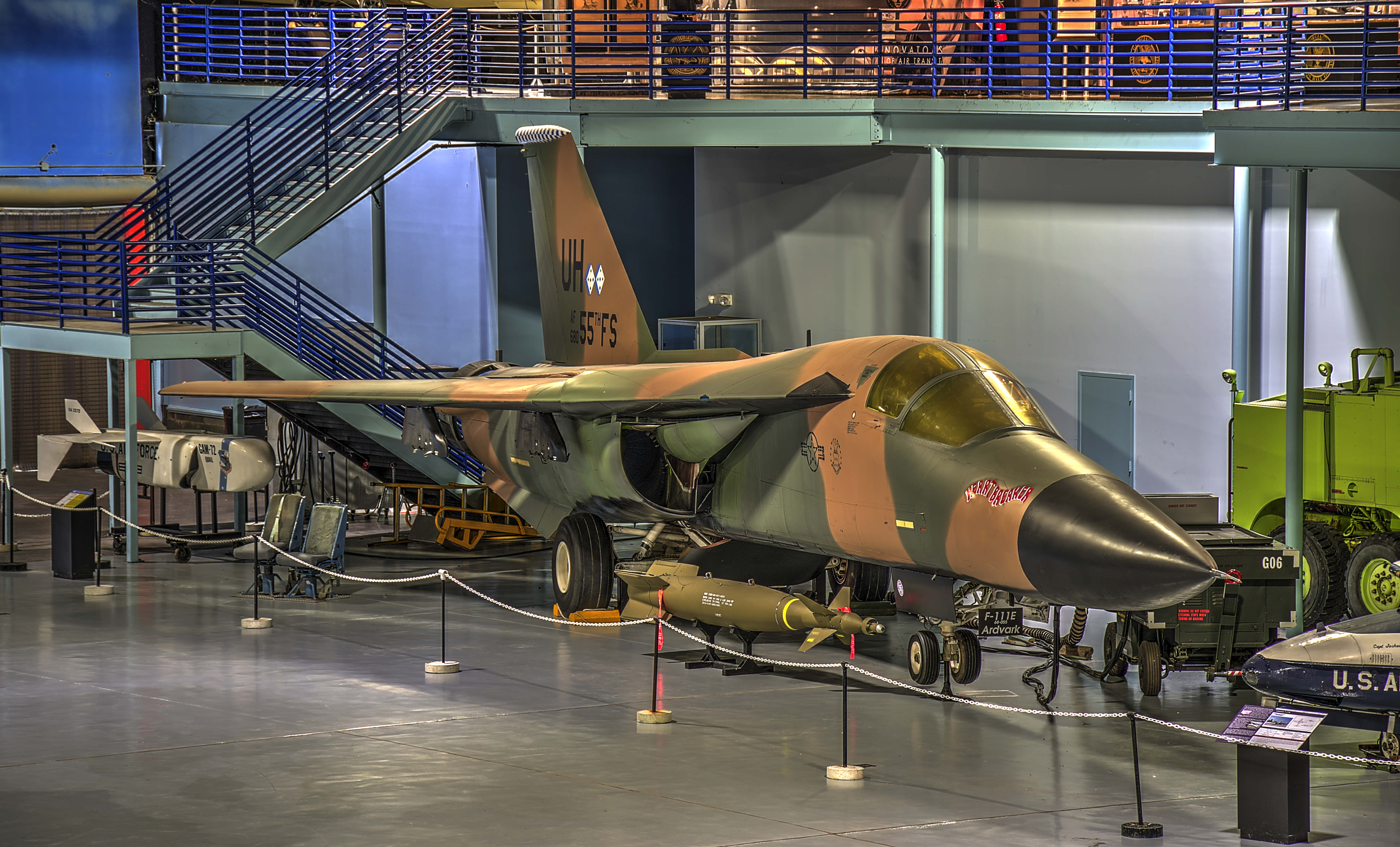
F-111E on display at the Museum of Aviation, Robins AFB

- 68-0055 – Museum of Aviation, Robins AFB, Warner Robins, Georgia (nicknamed "Heartbreaker")
- 68-0058 – Air Force Armament Museum, Eglin AFB, Valparaiso, Florida

F-111F

- 70-2364 – In the median strip of US Highway 70, in Portales, New Mexico. It is fixed to a pedestal and serves as a monument.
- 70-2390 – National Museum of the United States Air Force, Wright-Patterson AFB, Dayton, Ohio
- 70-2408 – Santa Fe County Municipal, Santa Fe, New Mexico.
- 74-0178 – Aviation Heritage Park, Bowling Green, Kentucky

F-111G

- 67-0159 – Aerospace Museum of California, McClellan AFB (formerly), Sacramento, California (FB-111A development aircraft, converted to F-111G)
- 68-0239 – K. I. Sawyer Heritage Air Museum, formerly K.I. Sawyer AFB, Marquette, Michigan (nicknamed the "Rough Night"); converted to F-111G
- 68-0284 – Barksdale Global Power Museum, Barksdale AFB, Bossier City, Louisiana.
- 68-0287 – Wings Over the Rockies Air and Space Museum (former Lowry AFB), Denver, Colorado

FB-111A

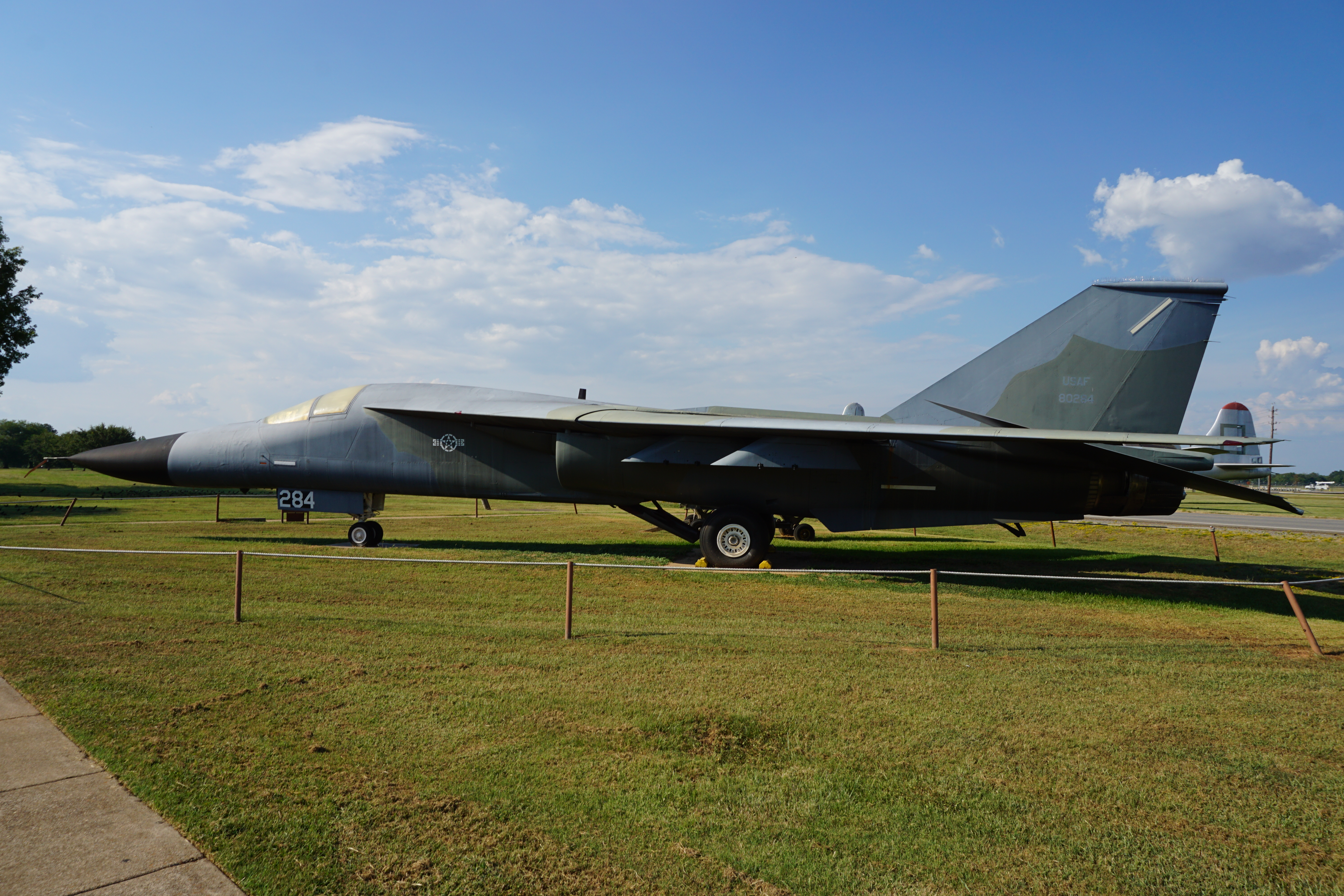
FB-111A at the Barksdale Global Power Museum

- 68-0245 – March Field Air Museum, March ARB, Riverside, California (nicknamed "Ready Teddy")
- 68-0248 – South Dakota Air and Space Museum, Ellsworth AFB, South Dakota (nicknamed "Free For All").
- 68-0267 – Strategic Air Command & Aerospace Museum in Ashland, Nebraska (nicknamed "Black Widow")
- 68-0275 – Kelly Field Heritage Museum, Lackland AFB / Kelly Field San Antonio, Texas (painted in tactical scheme). It is fixed to a pedestal and serves as a monument.
- 68-0286 – Clyde Lewis Airpark (adjacent to former Plattsburgh AFB), Plattsburgh, New York (nicknamed "SAC Time"). It is fixed to a pedestal and serves as a monument.
- 69-6507 – Castle Air Museum (former Castle AFB), Atwater, California (nicknamed "Madam Queen")
- 69-6509 – Whiteman AFB, Knob Noster, Missouri (gate guard) (nicknamed "The Spirit of the Seacoast").

== Specifications (F-111F) ==
An orthographically projected diagram of the F-111

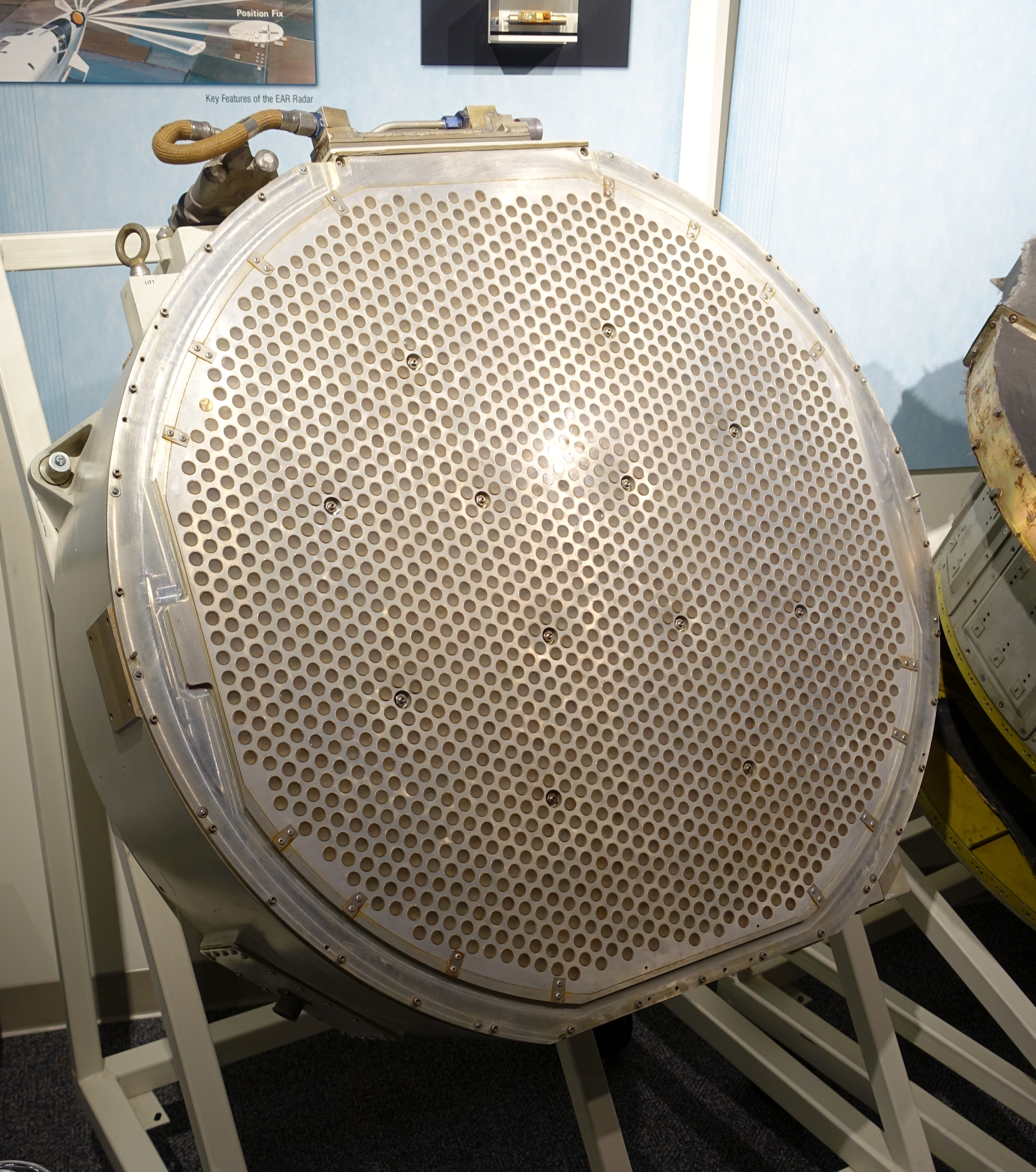
Electronically Agile Radar (PESA, precursor of the AN/APQ-164 for B-1 Lancer), specifically designed for the FB-111

Data from General Dynamics F-111 "Aardvark", The Complete Encyclopedia of World Aircraft, RAND

General characteristics

- Crew: 2
- Length: 73 ft 6 in (22.40 m)
- Wingspan: 63 ft (19 m)
- Swept wingspan: 32 ft (9.8 m) swept
- Height: 17 ft 1.5 in (5.220 m)
- Wing area: 657.4 sq ft (61.07 m^{2}) spread, 525 sq ft (48.8 m^{2}) swept
- Aspect ratio: 7.56 spread

1.95 swept

- Airfoil: root: NACA 64-210.68; tip: NACA 64-209.80
- Empty weight: 47,200 lb (21,410 kg)
- Gross weight: 82,800 lb (37,557 kg)
- Max takeoff weight: 100,000 lb (45,359 kg)
- Zero-lift drag coefficient: 0.0186
- Zero-lift drag coefficient area: 9.36 sq ft (0.87 m^{2})
- Powerplant: 2 × Pratt & Whitney TF30-P-100 afterburning turbofan engines, 14,560 lbf (64.8 kN) thrust each dry, 25,100 lbf (112 kN) with afterburner

Performance

- Maximum speed: 1,434 kn (1,650 mph, 2,656 km/h) at altitude

795 kn (915 mph; 1,472 km/h) / Mach 1.2 at sea level

- Maximum speed: Mach 2.5
- Range: 3,210 nmi (3,690 mi, 5,940 km)
- Ferry range: 3,210 nmi (3,690 mi, 5,940 km) with external drop tanks
- Service ceiling: 66,000 ft (20,000 m)
- g limits: +7.33
- Rate of climb: 25,890 ft/min (131.5 m/s)
- Wing loading: 126 lb/sq ft (620 kg/m^{2}) spread

158 lb/sq ft (771 kg/m^{2}) wings swept

- Thrust/weight: 0.61

Armament

- Guns: 1× 20 mm (0.787 in) M61A1 Vulcan 6-barreled Gatling cannon in weapons bay (seldom fitted)
- Hardpoints: 9 in total (8× under-wing, 1× under-fuselage between engines) plus 2 attach points in weapons bay with a capacity of 31,500 lb (14,300 kg), with provisions to carry combinations of:
  - Missiles:
    - AGM-69 SRAM thermonuclear air-to-surface missile (FB-111A only)
    - AGM-130 stand-off bomb
    - AIM-9 short range infrared air-to-air missile
  - Bombs:
    - Free-fall general-purpose bombs including Mk 82 (500 lb/227 kg), Mk 83 (1,000 lb/454 kg), Mk 84 (2,000 lb/907 kg), and Mk 117 (750 lb/340 kg)
    - Cluster bombs
    - BLU-109 (2,000 lb/907 kg) hardened penetration bomb
    - Paveway laser-guided bombs, including 2,000 lb (907 kg) GBU-10, 500 lb (227 kg) GBU-12, and 4,800 lb (2,200 kg) GBU-28 penetration bomb
    - BLU-107 Durandal runway-cratering bomb
    - GBU-15 electro-optical bomb
    - B61 or B43 nuclear bombs

== Notable appearances in media ==
The sound of an F-111 flyby is on the Voyager Golden Record.

The RAAF F-111 aircraft appeared during the Sydney 2000 Olympics closing ceremony in a low flyover.

== See also ==
- ASALM

Related development

- General Dynamics–Grumman F-111B
- General Dynamics–Grumman EF-111A Raven
- General Dynamics–Boeing AFTI/F-111A Aardvark
- General Dynamics F-111C
- General Dynamics F-111K

Aircraft of comparable role, configuration, and era

- BAC TSR-2 – (United Kingdom)
- Dassault Mirage IV – (France)
- Panavia Tornado – (United Kingdom, West Germany, Italy)
- Sukhoi Su-24 – (Soviet Union, Russia)

Related lists

- List of bomber aircraft
- List of military aircraft of the United States
- List of military electronics of the United States
