= 1972 in the Vietnam War =

← 1971 1973 →
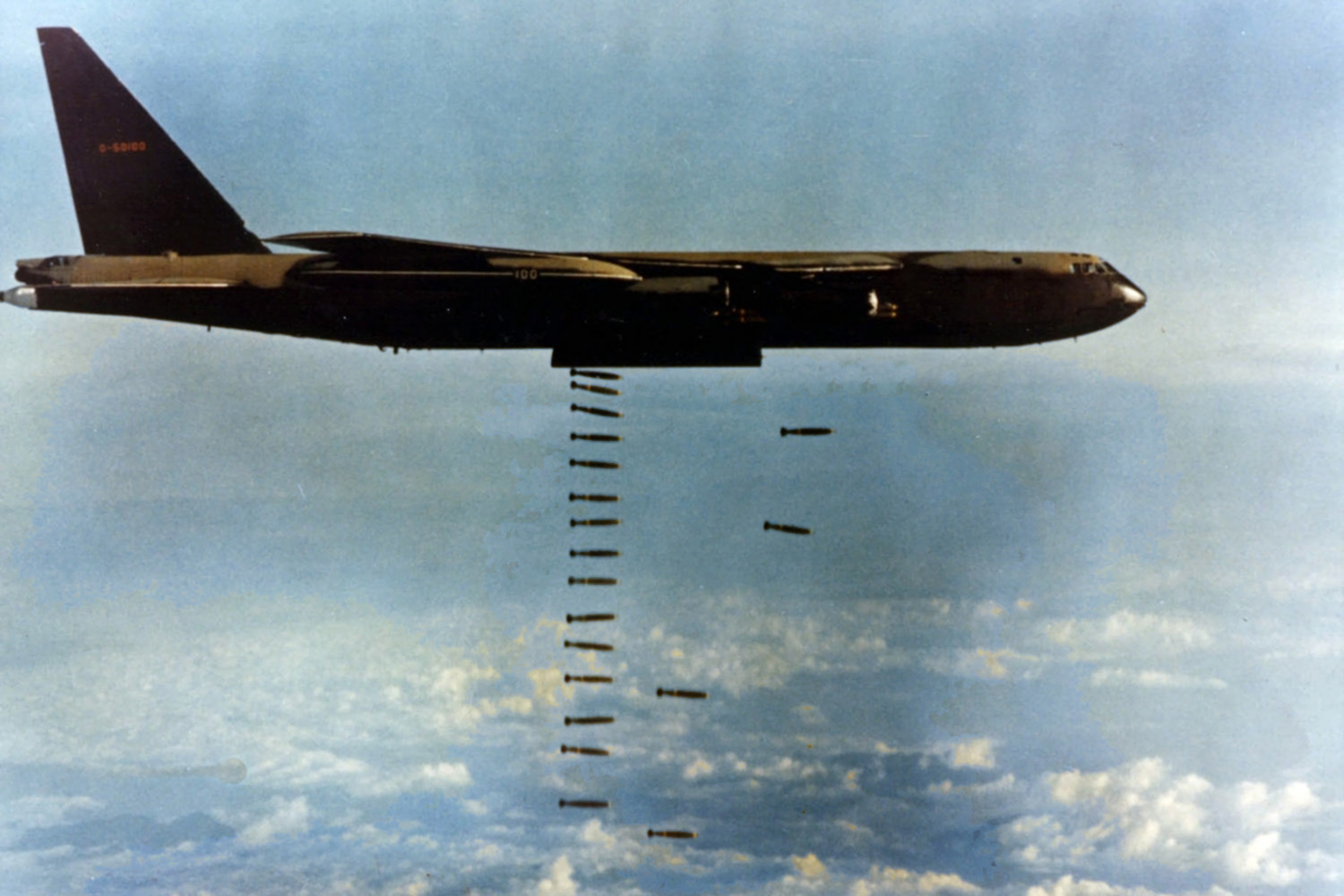
- B-52 bombing run
Location	Vietnam

Belligerents
Anti-Communist forces: South Vietnam; United States; South Korea; Australia; New Zealand (Cambodia) Khmer Republic; Thailand; Kingdom of Laos; Republic of China	Communist forces: North Vietnam (Provisional Revolutionary Government of the Republic of South Vietnam) Viet Cong (Cambodia) Khmer Rouge (Laos) Pathet Lao; Soviet Union

Strength
South Vietnam: 1,048,000; United States: 24,000 (end of the year); South Korea: 36,790; Thailand : 40; Australia : 630; Philippines: 50 New Zealand: 50	~200,000

Casualties and losses
US: 759 killed South Vietnam: 39,587 killed	U.S. estimate: 50,000 - 75,000 killed PAVN claim: 100,000+ casualties (including ~40,000 killed/missing)

1972 in the Vietnam War saw foreign involvement in South Vietnam slowly declining. Three allies, Australia, New Zealand and Thailand, which had each contributed military contingents, left South Vietnam this year. The United States continued to participate in combat, primarily with air power to assist the South Vietnamese, while negotiators in Paris tried to hammer out a peace agreement and withdrawal strategy for the United States.

On 30 March North Vietnam launched the Nguyễn Huệ or Easter Offensive, a massive conventional invasion of South Vietnam. This led to a large increase in U.S. airpower and airstrikes to defend South Vietnam and a resumption of bombing of North Vietnam. By September the South Vietnamese had regained most of the territory lost in the offensive and the North Vietnamese returned to negotiations. Operation Linebacker II in mid to late December saw intensive bombing around Hanoi and Haiphong.

== January ==
1 January

U.S. military personnel in South Vietnam numbered 156,800 while Free World Military Assistance Forces (largely Republic of Korea Army) numbered 53,900.

The South Vietnamese government announced that there had been 20 breaches of the New Year's ceasefire resulting in nine South Vietnamese and 16 People's Army of Vietnam (PAVN)/Vietcong VC killed.

U.S. aircraft flew more than 200 sorties to attack PAVN supply lines in Cambodia and Laos.

The U.S. Army reported that between 1969 and 1971 over 700 Fraggings occurred resulting in 82 dead and 631 wounded.

2 January

President Richard Nixon announced that unilateral U.S. troop withdrawals from South Vietnam would continue, but a residual force of 25–35,000 would remain until all U.S. prisoners of war (POWs) were released.

South Vietnam withdrew more than 10,000 soldiers from operations in Cambodia to bolster defenses around Saigon in preparation for an expected PAVN/VC during Tết.

3 January

Democratic Senator George McGovern accused Nixon of deceiving the public by suggesting that the North Vietnamese had rejected a release of POWs in return for a firm date for withdrawal of U.S. forces, saying that Nixon was using the issue to justify bombing the North and propping up the government of President of South Vietnam Nguyễn Văn Thiệu.

Max Frankel writing in The New York Times stated that Nixon was buying time to build up South Vietnam through Vietnamization and improve the position of anti-communist forces in Cambodia and Laos.

PAVN ambushed a U.S. infantry patrol 40 miles (64 km) northeast of Saigon and then shot down three Medevac helicopters, resulting in one U.S. killed.

4 January

A Royal Lao Army (RLA) spokesman said that a PAVN force, supported by two Vietnam People's Air Force (VPAF) MiG jets, had destroyed a bridge on Route 13, 20 miles (32 km) from the besieged RLA base at Long Tieng. Seven RLA and 14 PAVN were killed in the attack.

5 January

A United States Air Force (USAF) F-105G escorting B-52 Stratofortresses on a bombing mission over Laos attacked a PAVN radar-guided antiaircraft gun 10 miles (16 km) north of the Ban Karai Pass in the first "protective reaction" strike of the year. B-52s also bombed PAVN positions near Khe Sanh.

The South Vietnamese Joint General Staff (JGS) announced that they were withdrawing from fixed bases in Cambodia and would in future rely on a 15,000 man airmobile and armored cavalry task force assigned to Military Region 3 to undertake operations there.

North Vietnam announced that in order for the U.S. to secure the release of its POWs it must "completely end the war of aggression in Vietnam and remove all its troops from Vietnam" and "completely end the Vietnamization policy of continuing the war" which it denounced as a "plot to withdraw United States forces but still continue the war of American aggression by puppet forces under United States direction and with United States support and supplies."

6 January

At the Paris Peace Talks the North Vietnamese reiterated their position that U.S. POWs would only be released once the U.S. withdrew all its forces and the U.S. "give up aggression, stop the "Vietnamization" of the war, pull out from South Vietnam all the troops... stop backing the Nguyễn Văn Thiệu bellicose puppet group."

Democratic Senator Edmund Muskie called for the U.S. to withdraw from South Vietnam regardless of the consequences saying that 55,000 American lives and $130 billion spent on the war had been "wasted."

8 January

In response to India's decision to upgrade its diplomatic relations with North Vietnam to ambassadorial level, South Vietnam announced that India could no longer be regarded as an impartial member of the International Control Commission and barred the new Indian chair of the commission from entering South Vietnam.

9 January

A VC threw a grenade into a youth rally in Quy Nhon in an attempt to kill the Bình Định province chief, the grenade killed two teachers and seven students and wounded 110 others.

RLA forces held off PAVN attacks on Ban Nhik, the last government position on the Boloven Plateau, 20 miles (32 km) east of Pakse. In three days of fighting the RLA claimed to have killed more than 75 PAVN around Ban Nhik with a further 200 killed in airstrikes and reports of more than 200 wounded being taken to Paksong.

10 January

The Cambodian Khmer National Army (ANK) withdrew from the town of Ponhea Kraek (Krek) near the Fishhook abandoning the last remaining road link between Cambodia and South Vietnam. Further south in the Parrot's Beak the South Vietnamese Army of the Republic of Vietnam (ARVN) began Operation Prek Ta against the PAVN in that area of Cambodia. The objective of the offensive was to disrupt the preparations of the North Vietnamese for an anticipated offensive on Tết, 15 February.

Former Vice President Hubert Humphrey announced his candidacy for the Democratic presidential nomination and criticized the slow pace of withdrawal from South Vietnam, saying that if he had been elected in 1968 all U.S. forces would have been withdrawn already.

The New York Times reported on the growing expectation of a PAVN offensive in the Central Highlands timed to coincide with Nixon's visit to China.

Three Communist Party of Thailand sappers attempted to destroy B-52s at U-Tapao Royal Thai Navy Airfield, Thailand using grenades and satchel charges. One attacker was apparently killed in the attack, while the other two managed to cause minor damage to three B-52s before fleeing the base.

11 January

The South Vietnamese military acknowledged that it was withdrawing its forces from Krek and other locations in Cambodia in preparation for an expected PAVN offensive during Tết.

The PAVN fired two SA-2 Surface-to-air missiles (SAMs) at a USAF F-4 Phantom near Tchepone, showing the continuous improvement of PAVN air defences in Laos. A USAF F-4 fired two missiles at a radar site in North Vietnam in a "protective reaction" strike while escorting B-52s in a bombing raid on the Ban Karai Pass.

RLA forces abandoned Ban Nhik after four days of heavy fighting.

12 January

Le Duc Tho, Politburo member and secret negotiator for North Vietnam in the Paris Peace Talks, cabled the head of Central Office for South Vietnam (COSVN) in South Vietnam that "we and the enemy are preparing for a ferocious confrontation... during the upcoming spring and summer." In addition to supporting the PAVN troops in South Vietnam, Tho instructed COSVN to devote attention to attacking the Civil Operations and Revolutionary Development Support (CORDS) pacification program] and to the political struggle in the cities of South Vietnam.

The 2,400-man ANK 22nd Brigade deployed near Krek dissolved itself with officers and soldiers shedding their uniforms and fleeing into South Vietnam.

More than 34 PAVN/VC shelling and ground attacks were reported in the most intensive attacks in three months. A VC unit attacked a 30-man ARVN patrol in the Mekong Delta killing three, with eleven missing. The PAVN/VC shot down a U.S. UH-1 helicopter in the Mekong Delta killing all four crewmen.

Cambodian and South Vietnamese forces began a joint operation near Ang Tassom 42 miles (68 km) south of Phnom Penh.

13 January

Nixon announced that 70,000 American troops would be pulled out of South Vietnam by 1 May, cutting the existing force of 139,000 by half.

PAVN/VC attacks continued throughout South Vietnam conducting 26 attacks resulting in 33 PAVN/VC killed and 15 ARVN killed. Two USAF F-105Gs fired missiles at a SAM site on the Laos-North Vietnam border, while escorting B-52s.

14 January

A USAF F-105G destroyed a SAM site 3 miles (4.8 km) north of the Vietnamese Demilitarized Zone (DMZ) while escorting United States Navy fighter-bombers attacking the Ho Chi Minh Trail.

15 January

Military Assistance Command, Vietnam (MACV) reported that the North Vietnamese were moving more SAMs closer to the DMZ with an F-105G destroying a SAM site in the eastern DMZ and two SA-2s being fired on an F-105 flying 15 miles (24 km) north of the DMZ near the Laos-North Vietnam border. In ongoing attacks throughout South Vietnam 89 PAVN/VC, 15 ARVN and 15 civilians were reported killed.

RLA forces were flown into Long Tieng and were reported to have broken the siege of the base, recapturing Skyline Ridge 2 miles (3.2 km) north of the base.

16 January

Leaders of 46 Protestant, Catholic, and Jewish organizations met in Kansas City and asked for the withdrawal of American military personnel from South Vietnam and a cut-off in aid to the South Vietnamese government.

USAF jets engaged a VPAF MiG-21 jet over northern Laos for the first time in a year. A PAVN/VC mortar attack on Cam Ranh Base killed seven ARVN.

17 January

In a secret letter to Thiệu, Nixon warned that his refusal to sign a peace agreement to end the war would make it impossible for the U.S. to continue support for South Vietnam.

U.S. aircraft flew more than 200 airstrikes against PAVN supply lines in Laos to disrupt preparations for a PAVN offensive and returned fire against PAVN SAM sites near the Ban Karai Pass.

18 January

Seymour Hersh who wrote the first detailed account of the My Lai massacre reported that a U.S. Army investigation showed that more than 347 civilians had been killed at My Lai, rather than less than 200 as previously reported and that more than 90 civilians had been killed in the nearby village of My Khe 4 on the same day.

Two VPAF MiGs conducted an unsuccessful hit and run attack on USAF F-4s over northern Laos, firing three air-to-air missiles before fleeing back across the border. USAF aircraft conducted more than 250 airstrikes over Laos.

19 January

A U.S. Navy F-4B piloted by Lieutenant Duke Cunningham and Lieutenant j.g. William P. Driscoll engaged and shot down a VPAF MiG-21 near Quang Lang Air Base scoring the first U.S. aerial victory in 22 months.

Reporters were flown into Long Tieng for the first time ever to view operations at the previously secret base.

A U.S. UH-1 helicopter was shot down 1 mile (1.6 km) southwest of Khe Sanh while attempting to rescue the crew of a shot-down F-4. Two crewmembers were killed and a further six injured.

20 January

The head of MACV, General Creighton Abrams cabled Washington that "the enemy [North Vietnam] is preparing and positioning his forces for a major offensive.... There is no doubt this is to be a major campaign." Abrams requested additional authority to use U.S. American air power to mount an effective defense.

More than 10,000 ARVN began a sweep of PAVN/VC base areas in a plantation 45 miles (72 km) northwest of Saigon as part of ongoing efforts to disrupt an anticipated Tết offensive.

More than 12,000 Royal Thai Army and other paramilitary forces began an offensive against an estimated 150-200 communists in the mountainous Lom Sak District of northeast Thailand.

22 January

Heavy fighting continued on Skyline Ridge in Laos and the RLA abandoned Phou Khoun northwest of Long Tieng, however Laotian Premier Souvanna Phouma said that further U.S. aid would not be required unless the situation deteriorated further.

The JGS reported that 35 PAVN/VC had been killed for the loss of four ARVN, mostly in fighting in Bình Định province, while South Korean forces reported killing 38 PAVN/VC.

23 January

U.S. jets attacked two antiaircraft gun sites in the DMZ and one east of the Ban Karai Pass. The JGS reported killing 38 PAVN/VC and capturing two for the loss of two ARVN.

24 January

U.S. jets carried out a further three "protective reaction" strikes against PAVN antiaircraft sites, two near the Ban Karai Pass and one near Đồng Hới.

United States Army Vietnam acknowledged that a regulation had been passed two weeks previously allowing "local national guests" onto U.S. bases, effectively sanctioning prostitution since local towns were declared off limits except to soldiers on official duties.

25 January

Nixon revealed that National Security Adviser Henry Kissinger had been meeting secretly with North Vietnamese representatives for more than 2 years. He also revealed the U.S. peace plan that had been proposed to Hanoi. Nixon proposed that, within six months of an agreement, all U.S. military be withdrawn from South Vietnam, POWs exchanged, an internationally supervised ceasefire implemented and a presidential election held in South Vietnam. Nixon did not demand the withdrawal of North Vietnamese military forces from South Vietnam. In a radio address, Thiệu endorsed the proposal, including the provision that he and the Vice President would resign one month before the presidential election.

25-6 January

The Republic of Vietnam Air Force (RVNAF) reported sighting six PAVN T-54 tanks 7 miles (11 km) south of Ben Het Camp. RVNAF aircraft attacked PAVN convoys 9 miles (14 km) west of Ben Het Camp and 7 miles southwest of Firebase 5 in the Central Highlands.

26 January

North Vietnam rejected the U.S. peace proposal and submitted a counterproposal at the same time as publishing bellicose messages alluding to a coming offensive.

A USAF F-4 carried out a "protective reaction" strike on a SAM site near Đồng Hới. The JGS reported that 31 PAVN/VC had been killed in operations in the Mekong Delta.

27 January

North Vietnam criticized the U.S. for making public the details of secret peace talks and repeated its demand for the immediate and unconditional withdrawal of U.S. military personnel from South Vietnam and the removal of the Thiệu government.

The Nixon administration acknowledged that an offer of up to $2.5 billion of U.S. aid had been offered to North Vietnam as part of a $7.5 billion reconstruction aid package for Indochina.

28 January

The JGS reported that 116 PAVN/VC had been killed in two battles in the Central Highlands.

MACV and the JGS released casualty figures for the war to date, reporting 45,639 U.S., 138,803 South Vietnamese and 792,437 PAVN/VC killed.

In a performance at a White House gala dinner by the Ray Conniff Singers, one of the singers, Carole Feraci, held up a banner reading "Stop the Killing" and said "President Nixon, stop bombing human beings, animals and vegetation. You go to church on Sundays and pray to Jesus Christ, if Jesus Christ were here tonight, you would not dare to drop another bomb."

29 January

The New York Times reported on the widespread corruption throughout South Vietnam and also on the confusion within the South Vietnamese government in reporting on the war with frequent retractions and denials.

30 January

U.S. intelligence sources stated that PAVN political officers had instructed PAVN/VC soldiers that decisive blows would be made while Nixon visited China in February and U.S. Army Chief of Staff General William Westmoreland on a visit to Saigon said that an offensive was expected in February.

31 January

North Vietnam released a peace proposal it had made to the U.S. in June 1971 together with other correspondence relating to the secret talks conducted with Kissinger, in an apparent attempt to counter any propaganda gains the U.S. had made earlier in the month by revealing such talks.

The JGS reported that three PAVN tanks had been destroyed by RVNAF aircraft in the Central Highlands and that 54 PAVN and nine ARVN had been killed in fighting along the DMZ over the weekend with more than 200 rockets and mortar rounds hitting ARVN bases on 29 January.

The Cambodian government was reported to have approached the Soviet Embassy to initiate peace talks with North Vietnam that would provide for an internationally supervised withdrawal of PAVN forces to the east of the Mekong River and north of Route 7.

David Morrell's novel First Blood about a troubled homeless Vietnam veteran named Rambo is published. In October 1982 the film adaptation First Blood was released.

== February ==
1 February

U.S. aircraft conducted seven "protective reaction" strikes against PAVN antiaircraft sites near the Ban Karai and Ban Ravieng Passes.

2 February

After observation aircraft saw a PAVN force west of Tây Ninh, airstrikes were conducted on them and then more than 3,000 ARVN Rangers and armored cavalry pursued approximately 400 PAVN across the border into Cambodia.

PAVN forces captured Muong Kassy 90 miles (140 km) north of Vientiane.

3 February

The VC delegation at the Paris Peace Talks formally rejected Nixon's peace proposal of 25 January and reissued their 1971 peace proposal calling for the resignation of Thiệu, a cessation of South Vietnam's "warlike policies", a firm date for U.S. withdrawal and release of all military and political prisoners. The plan was immediately rejected by the South Vietnamese delegation.

The New York Times reported that U.S. officials in South Vietnam "appear to be going to extraordinary lengths to spread bad news about the war in Vietnam" in discussing the PAVN offensive expected in February, apparently in an attempt to prevent any repeat of the shock to the American public caused by the 1968 Tet Offensive.

The JGS reported that RVNAF A-37 Dragonfly jets had destroyed four PAVN tanks 3 miles (4.8 km) inside Cambodia, near the tri-border area in the Central Highlands.

The ARVN 9th Division killed 14 PAVN/VC in the U Minh Forest for the loss of nine ARVN killed.

4 February

Nixon approved additional authority to Abrams in South Vietnam to use American power to counter the anticipated North Vietnamese offensive. Specifically, the President acknowledged the growing threat from North Vietnamese SAMs and authorized the USAF to strike against SAM sites in the southern part of North Vietnam and neighboring Laos.

The last 824 Thai soldiers departed South Vietnam.

China condemned Nixon's 25 January peace proposal, endorsed the VC peace proposal and pledged ongoing support for North Vietnam and the VC.

5 February

North Vietnam formally rejected Nixon's 25 January peace proposal.

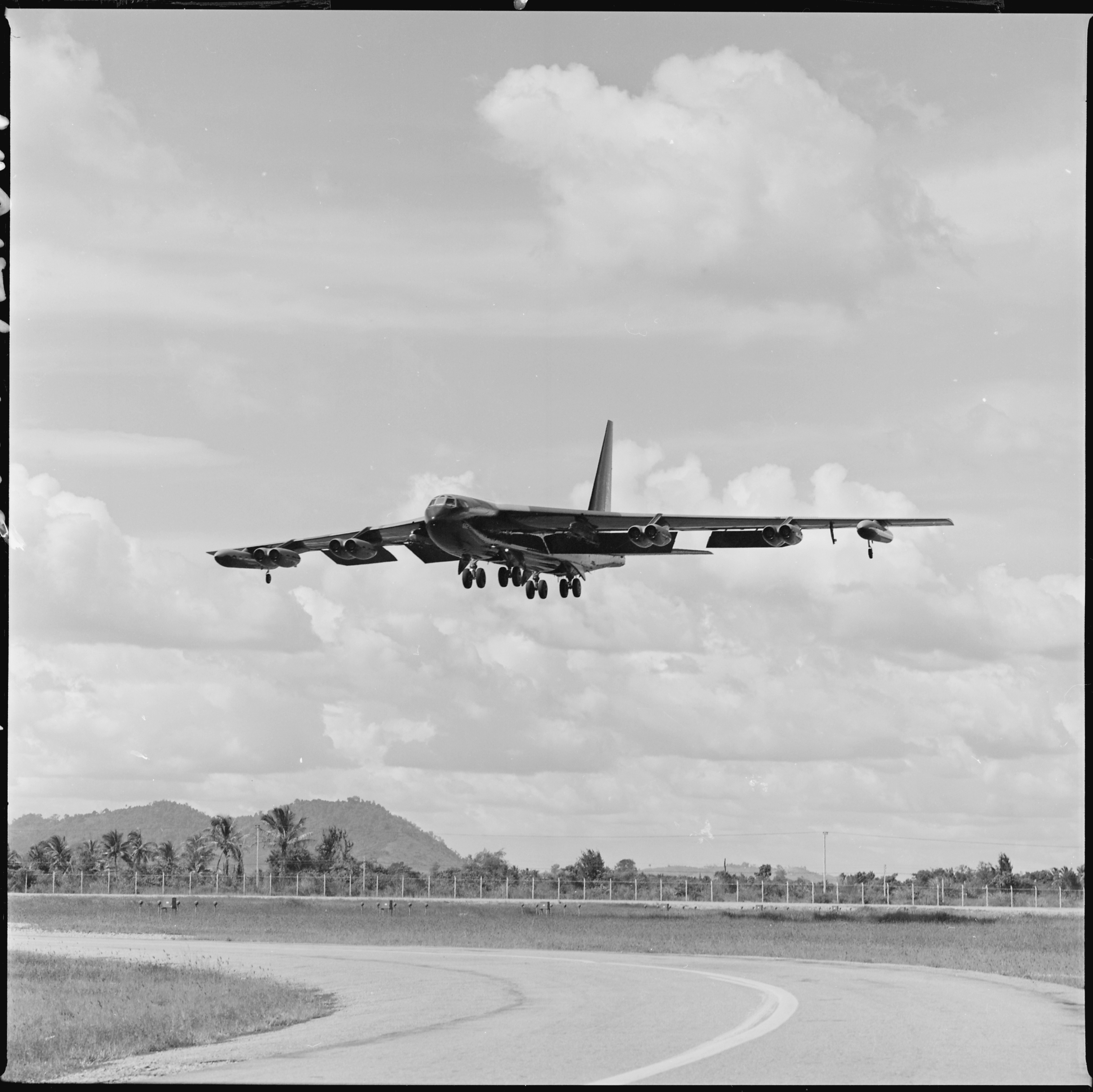
A B-52 lands at U-Tapao Royal Thai Navy Airfield

Nixon ordered the draw down of USAF assets halted and the reassignment (Operation Bullet Shot) of 150 B-52s to Andersen Air Force Base in Guam and U-Tapao Royal Thai Navy Airfield in Thailand in anticipation of the PAVN offensive in South Vietnam.

Cambodia executed three men for terrorist attacks including the attempted assassination of U.S. Ambassador to Cambodia Emory C. Swank on 7 September 1970.

ARVN generals in I Corps expressed doubts about a PAVN offensive in February, stating that they believed no major action would take place until March at the earliest due to the need for the PAVN to build up their logistics.

The JGS reported that 82 PAVN/VC had been killed for the loss of two ARVN in ten clashes, many in ambushes in the Central Highlands.

6 February

In a televised interview recorded in Paris, the North Vietnamese negotiator Xuân Thủy stated that U.S. POWs would not be freed until the U.S. withdrew its support for the Thiệu government and the war was ended, reversing their earlier position that a fixed date for withdrawal of all U.S. forces would secure the release of the POWs.

The JGS reported that 59 PAVN/VC had been killed in five separate clashes, including 41 in the U Minh Forest for ARVN losses of 12 killed.

6 February - 17 March

Operation Strength was an RLA offensive against PAVN forces in northern Laos to drawn forces away from besieging Long Tieng.

7 February

Nixon aide H. R. Haldeman in a television interview said that domestic opponents to Nixon's 25 January peace proposal were "consciously aiding and abetting the enemy of the United States."

PAVN forces overran Dong Hene on Route 9 in Laos forcing the two RLA battalions defending the outpost to withdraw.

8 February

In Operation Bullet Shot I 29 B-52s were sent to Andersen Air Force Base and ten KC-135s were sent to Kadena.

9 February

A PAVN rocket attack on Da Nang Air Base killed three South Vietnamese civilians. A PAVN/VC sapper attack on Firebase 97 near An Khê killed six ARVN, while ten PAVN/VC were killed and two captured.

10 February

Thiệu rejected any further concessions beyond those in Nixon's 25 January peace proposal and criticized U.S. Secretary of State William P. Rogers' statement that the U.S. would be flexible.

PAVN/VC forces conducted 41 attacks across South Vietnam. In an attack on An Bao 40 PAVN/VC and ten ARVN were killed. In response U.S. and RVNAF aircraft completed a 24-hour period of bombing strikes across South Vietnam, with almost 400 airstrikes carried out.

The USS Constellation arrived off the coast of Vietnam joining two other aircraft carriers in preparation for the expected PAVN offensive.

Pentagon officials stated that the expected PAVN offensive could last as long as three months.

11 February

G. McMurtrie Godley, U.S. Ambassador to Laos, responded negatively to a proposal by the White House, Defense Department, State Department and CIA that Laotian and Thai troops and American CIA operatives be withdrawn from Long Tieng, the headquarters of Laotian resistance to the communist Pathet Lao and PAVN. Godley argued that withdrawing from Long Tieng would plunge the United States into "an abyss" and be "a dramatic military setback and political disequilibrium at the time of the President's visit to Peking.

The "World Assembly of Paris for Peace and Independence of Indochinese Peoples" opened at the Versailles Congress Hall outside of Paris and accused the U.S. of escalating the war and sabotaging peace negotiations.

U.S. and RVNAF aircraft completed more than 200 airstrikes, largely against PAVN targets in I Corps, while the number of PAVN/VC attacks declined.

11 February - 31 March

Operation Sinsay was a planned RLA offensive that was pre-empted by a PAVN attack the reached Pakse, but RLA forces were then deployed to attack the PAVN lines of communications forcing their withdrawal.

12 February

Washington responded to Ambassador Godley in Laos conceding that it was "not in position to give you detailed tactical instructions from this distance." The Department of Defense maintained that Godley should be ordered to "thin out" the forces defending Long Tieng. The State Department, CIA, and White House disagreed and left the proposed thinning out to Godley's discretion. Godley chose to defend Long Tieng and the town was held for another three years until the final Communist victory in Laos.

The U.S. indefinitely postponed weekly meetings in Paris which it regarded as more for North Vietnamese propaganda purposes than negotiation.

Approximately 6,000 ANK troops began an operation to recapture the Angkor Wat temple complex, which was defended by more than 4,000 PAVN. Despite reinforcements the operation was ultimately unsuccessful.

13 February

The U.S. conducted its fifth day of airstrikes in the most intense bombing since 1970. Nineteen B-52 strikes were conducted in the 24 hour period ending at midday, the largest number since records began to be kept in June 1968.

An RLA armored task force recaptured Muong Kassy.

14 February

Heavy U.S. airstrikes continued, largely concentrated against PAVN supply lines and base areas 609 and 611 in the Central Highlands with 17 B-52 strikes conducted in the 24 hour period ending at midday. U.S. helicopter gunships killed 41 PAVN near Kon Tum. A unit of the 3rd Brigade, 1st Cavalry Division killed six PAVN 22 miles (35 km) southeast of Bien Hoa Air Base, with one U.S. killed and one helicopter destroyed.

The New York Times reported on the nervous mood in South Vietnam ahead of Tết due to the anticipated PAVN/VC offensive. A banner on the Saigon City Hall read "Enjoy Tết, but remember what happened to you in 1968."

The PAVN/VC began a four-day ceasefire at 01:00, while Allied forces began a 24-hour ceasefire at 18:00, limited only to South Vietnam.

15 February

The Tết holiday began in Vietnam. The JGS said that 35 ceasefire breaches had been made by PAVN/VC forces resulting in 24 PAVN/VC killed and two captured for the loss of eight ARVN killed, however the anticipated Tết offensive by the PAVN/VC did not occur. MACV reported that 61 PAVN/VC had been killed in U.S. airstrikes in the previous 24 hours. MACV also reported that three PAVN soldiers from the 304th Division were captured 30 miles (48 km) northwest of Kon Tum, indicating that elements of the division had moved south from their normal positions along the DMZ.

The Allied ceasefire concluded at 18:00 and U.S. aircraft immediately resumed bombing PAVN/VC base areas, particularly in the Central Highlands.

16 February

With no offensive commencing at Tết, some U.S. analysts discounted an offensive until after Nixon's visit to China, however they expected increased pressure on ARVN positions in the Central Highlands and this and increased infiltration from North Vietnam was the reason for increased U.S. airstrikes. However the senior American advisor in II Corps, John Paul Vann claimed that the offensive had already started and that he welcomed it.

The U.S. began a "limited duration" bombing campaign against PAVN artillery positions in southern Quảng Bình province and the DMZ. The raids destroyed five artillery pieces with one F-4 shot down and its crew missing.

A Gallup poll found that 52% of Americans approved of Nixon's handling of the war, while 39% disapproved.

17 February

The U.S. concluded its 29-hour "limited duration" campaign against PAVN artillery, having lost three USAF jets to SAMs. MACV claimed that seven 130mm artillery guns, five antiaircraft guns and two SAM sites were damaged or destroyed in the raids.

The JGS reported that 1,105 PAVN/VC and 360 ARVN had been killed in the preceding week. U.S. losses were two killed.

18 February

The PAVN/VC Tết ceasefire concluded at 01:00. U.S. aircraft conducted 148 airstrikes in the 24 hour period up to midday, while having one observation plane shot down 30 miles (48 km) north of Phnom Penh and three other aircraft lost in non-hostile incidents.

19 February

Five USAF airmen shot down in the "limited duration" campaign were displayed to the international press in Hanoi.

Four PAVN/VC attacks in the Mekong Delta killed 57 ARVN, while an attack on an ARVN outpost 25 miles (40 km) south of Huế killed six ARVN and destroyed a railroad bridge. ARVN Rangers fought approximately 150 PAVN 3 miles (4.8 km) south of Firebase 5 in the Central Highlands.

20 February

The PAVN/VC shelled Bien Hoa Air Base, Phan Rang Air Base and Phu Loi Base Camp and shot down two U.S. helicopters killing two crewmen. In the Mekong Delta a VC threw a grenade into a restaurant killing six civilians and wounding 110 others.

21 February

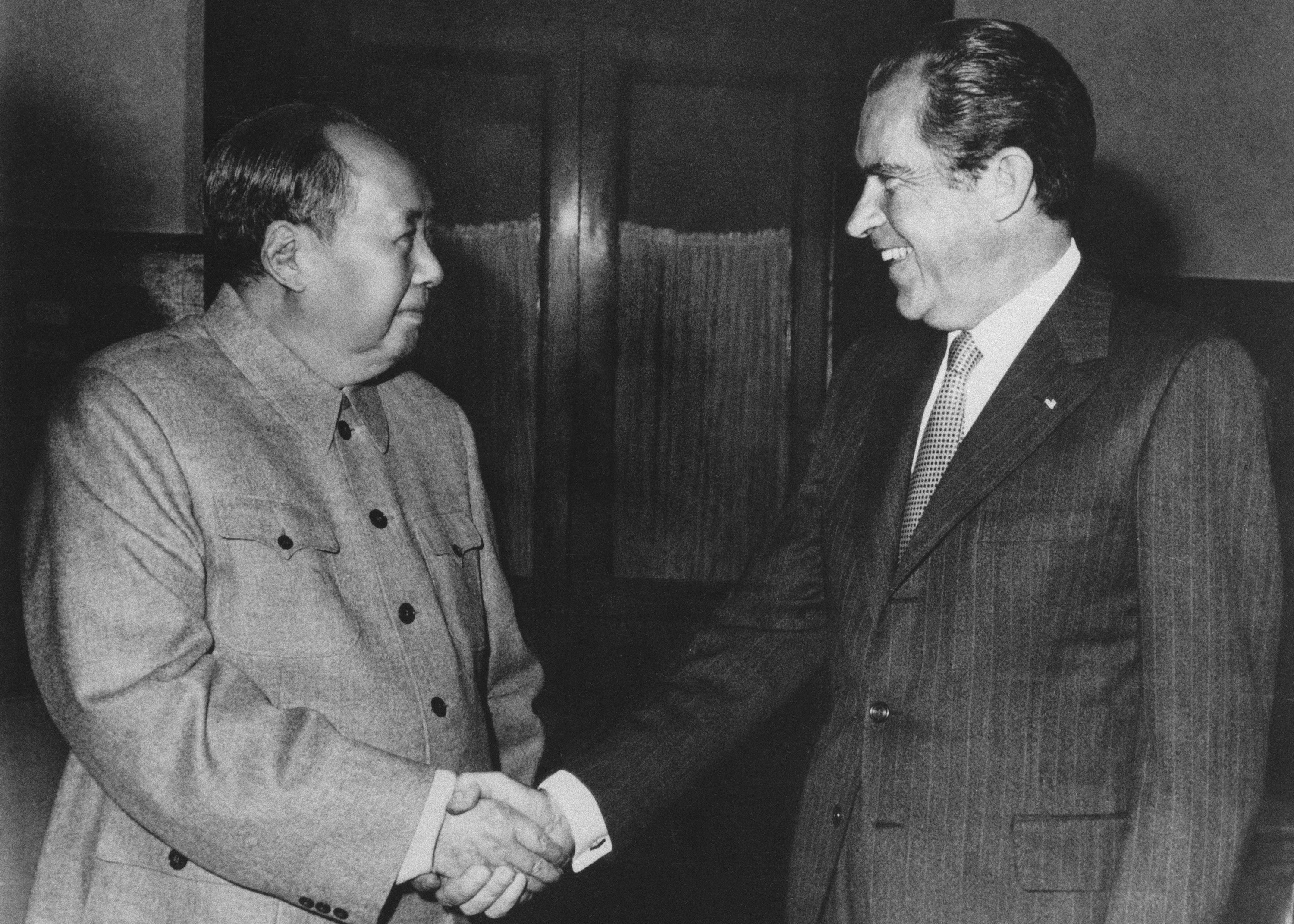
Chairman Mao Zedong and President Nixon

Nixon arrived in Beijing, China and met with Chinese Communist Party chairman Mao Zedong in the first direct face to face meeting between a Chinese Communist leader and an American President. North Vietnam feared that the Americans and Chinese would come up with a deal disadvantageous to North Vietnam. With the relationship of the United States improving with both the Soviet Union and China the Vietnam War "began to seem an irrelevant, troublesome historical leftover that might endanger the new relationships."

22 February

In a six-hour clash in the Quế Sơn Valley, six ARVN and 60 PAVN/VC were killed, including 28 killed by U.S. helicopter gunships. U.S. jets attacked a PAVN antiaircraft position 45 miles (72 km) north of the DMZ in another "protective reaction" strike.

23 February

Exiled ARVN General Nguyễn Chánh Thi was prevented from disembarking by Saigon police after arriving on a flight into Tan Son Nhat International Airport and the flight was ordered to depart with Thi as the only passenger.

Thiệu claimed that the Soviet Union had pushed North Vietnam to begin an offensive in order to undermine any peace discussions between the U.S. and China during Nixon's visit, but that U.S. and South Vietnamese air attacks had prevented such an attack.

Abrams said that the addiction rate among U.S. forces had declined and that morale had improved.

24 February

The North Vietnamese and VC delegations walked out of the Paris Peace Talks in protest at the recent upsurge in U.S. bombing. They would return to the negotiations the following week.

25 February

A U.S. UH-1 crashed into Danang harbor killing four Americans and three South Vietnamese, including Brigadier General Phan Đình Soạn, deputy commander of Military Region I and Colonel Albert Ward Smarr Jr, a senior adviser.

26 February

Twenty-one soldiers from the 3rd Brigade, 1st Cavalry Division were wounded and one killed attacking a PAVN/VC bunker complex 42 miles (68 km) east of Saigon, a BLU-82 bomb was later dropped on the bunkers. Six South Vietnamese militiamen were killed in a clash in Xuyên Mộc District. An ARVN reconnaissance unit killed eight PAVN/VC for the loss of two killed in Bình Dương province. Fourteen VC and two ARVN were killed in a clash in Bình Thuận province.

27 February

In a joint communique issued by Nixon and Zhou Enlai, the U.S. reiterated its 25 January peace proposal, while China reiterated its support for the VC position.

Saigon reported that 56 PAVN/VC and 19 ARVN had been killed in three clashes, one 7 miles (11 km) northwest of Svay Rieng, Cambodia, another at Đất Đỏ and third in the Quế Sơn Valley. Saigon also began another reconnaissance in force into Cambodia with a 1,500 armored task force crossing the border 150 miles (240 km) northeast of Saigon.

28 February

Units of the 3rd Brigade, 1st Cavalry Division killed nine PAVN/VC in two clashes 30 miles (48 km) northeast of Saigon.

29 February

South Korea completed the withdrawal of its 2nd Marine brigade from South Vietnam. Two Republic of Korea Army divisions totaling 36,000 men remained in South Vietnam.

== March ==
1 March

A USAF F-105G attacked a SAM site near Đồng Hới in the 67th "protective reaction" strike of the year.

Two VPAF MiG-21s attacked two USAF F-4s over the North Vietnam-Laos border and one of the F-4's piloted by Lieutenant Colonel Joseph Kittinger shot down one MiG-21.

2 March

MACV ended a special alert that had kept U.S. troops confined to their bases in preparation for an anticipated PAVN/VC offensive. B-52s conducted 13 sorties against PAVN troop concentrations in the tri-border area.

3 March

U.S. jets conducted three "protective reaction" strikes against antiaircraft sites in North Vietnam. The ARVN began a sweep in the Central Highlands killing five PAVN while finding 20 PAVN killed by airstrikes.

4 March

U.S. jets conducted another three "protective reaction" strikes against antiaircraft sites in North Vietnam. Radio Hanoi claimed that many civilians had been killed in the recent U.S. airstrikes.

5 March

The VC attacked an ammunition convoy on the Đồng Nai river sinking three barges carrying 300 tons of munitions.

6 March

Twenty U.S. jets attacked six antiaircraft positions in North Vietnam. One VPAF MiG-17 was shot down after five MiGs engaged three U.S. aircraft near Quang Lang Air Base.

6-31 March

Operation Strength II was an RLA offensive designed to draw PAVN forces away from besieging Long Tieng. The operation failed to divert PAVN forces.

7 March

U.S. bombing of anti-aircraft installations extended up to 120 miles (190 km) north of the DMZ. The 86 air raids carried out in North Vietnam so far in 1972 equaled the number of air raids against North Vietnam during all of 1971.

8 March

MACV announced that it would no longer provide details of the numbers of U.S. aircraft involved in raids on North Vietnam as such information could be useful to the North Vietnamese.

The PAVN conducted ten rocket and mortar attacks against ARVN bases along the DMZ. B-52s conducted 20 sorties in western Quảng Trị province and ARVN forces found ten PAVN killed by bombing in the A Sầu Valley.

U.S. aircraft struck North Vietnamese antiaircraft sites for the eighth successive day, hitting targets in the DMZ and 40 miles (64 km) to the North.

9 March

Prince Norodom Sihanouk stated that Zhou Enlai had met with North Vietnamese leaders after Nixon's visit and assured them of China's support "until total victory."

ARVN forces from the 1st Division engaged PAVN forces 12 miles (19 km) northwest of Huế killing seven for the loss of three killed. ARVN forces killed 12 PAVN for the loss of one ARVN in the Central Highlands near Tân Cảnh, while two tanks were seen near Ben Het Camp. ARVN forces killed six PAVN/VC in the U Minh Forst for the loss of three killed.

10 March

Prime Minister Lon Nol took power as head of state of Cambodia and nullified the constitution.

The U.S. 101st Airborne Division left South Vietnam, the last U.S. ground combat division to be withdrawn.

An ARVN armored task force comprising approximately 5,000 soldiers swept into the Parrot's Beak, Cambodia in an attempt to preempt a PAVN attack. The ARVN killed 23 PAVN from the 52nd Regiment, 320th Division in an ambush 1 mile (1.6 km) north of Ben Het Camp.

11 March

Approximately 2,000 ARVN Rangers launched an attack on PAVN bases near Takeo, Cambodia killing 17 PAVN for the loss of three ARVN. B-52 bombers supporting the assaults into Cambodia destroyed a PAVN/VC base containing 30-40 bunkers.

In Laos PAVN forces bombarded Long Tieng and Skyline Ridge and attacked Sam Thong, 6 miles (9.7 km) northwest of Long Tieng, in a new offensive to capture Long Tieng.

12 March

MACV reported that U.S. aircraft had destroyed several PAVN tanks on Route 9 in Laos in the preceding week.

The 1st Australian Task Force completed its withdrawal from South Vietnam.

13 March

PAVN forces captured Sam Thong after a 36-hour battle forcing the 4,000 T'ai defenders to withdraw.

ARVN forces killed 13 PAVN and captured one near Firebase 5 in the Central Highlands and killed a further four PAVN near Firebase 17 11 miles (18 km) south of Kontum. ARVN forces killed seven PAVN northwest of Firebase Gio Linh.

14 March

B-52s bombed a PAVN bunker complex in the Parrot's Beak, killing 34 PAVN. RVNAF aircraft destroyed three tanks and eight trucks in a PAVN convoy 6 miles (9.7 km) southwest of Ben Het. ARVN forces killed 64 PAVN in clashes near Firebase 5.

15 March

A PAVN rocket attack on Quảng Ngãi killed four civilians and wounded 27. The U.S. conducted "protective reaction" strikes on two antiaircraft sites in North Vietnam. The JGS reported that the bodies of 112 PAVN/VC had been found after U.S. bombing raids, including 75 in Cambodia where B-52s had destroyed more than 500 bunkers.

16 March

PAVN/VC attacks continued in Quảng Ngai province with numerous attacks aimed at militia units resulting in 13 ARVN and 18 civilians killed.

An explosion destroyed the main ammunition dump at Pochentong Airport, Phnom Penh.

Approximately 10,000 Royal Thai Army soldiers began an operation against communist insurgents 16 miles (26 km) northwest of Lom Sak District.

17 March

A UH-1 of the 3rd Brigade, 1st Cavalry Division crashed into the Đồng Nai river killing all 11 on board. In clashes west of Huế ARVN forces killed 55 PAVN for the loss of seven ARVN. RVNAF fighter-bombers destroyed ten PAVN trucks southwest of Ben Het.

Nearly half of Saigon's Vietnamese language newspapers were reported to have shut down after a Government ordered 120% increase in the price of newsprint paper in a step described as an attempt to silence opposition to the Government.

18 March

In clashes at Firebase Bastogne/Phu Xuan west of Huế, ARVN forces killed 127 PAVN and captured 43 weapons and later found the bodies of 53 PAVN killed by airstrikes. U.S. airstrikes on the Ho Chi Minh Trail caused 800 secondary explosions. Seventh Air Force spokesmen said that 15 PAVN tanks had been destroyed and 14 damaged between 3 and 8 March near Tchepone and Chavane, Laos. In operations in the Parrot's Beak, ARVN forces found two large supply caches including 1,000 fuel drums.

19 March

The PAVN launched a mortar barrage and assault on Firebase Bastogne wounding 42 ARVN. ARVN forces killed 19 PAVN for the loss of one killed 25 miles (40 km) south of Danang. In Cambodia ARVN forces killed 17 PAVN.

The New York Times reported on the improved PAVN antiaircraft defenses of the Ho Chi Minh Trail in Laos, noting that air defenses fired day and night and that U.S. attack aircraft were having to fly at higher altitudes and that some areas were too well defended to enter.

20 March

The PAVN continued their assault on Long Tieng with renewed attacks on RLA positions on Skyline Ridge.

The ARVN reported that in two weeks of fighting around Firebase Bastogne/Phu Xuan 513 PAVN and 42 ARVN had been killed, with 235 PAVN killed at Cu Mong/Hill 640. The PAVN were reported to be from the 6th Regiment who had withdrawn into base areas in the A Sầu Valley and Cambodia.

21 March

The Khmer Rouge bombarded Phnom Penh with artillery, killing more than 100 civilians with the main attack directed against Pochentong Airport. This was the heaviest attack on Phnom Penh since the Cambodian Civil War began in 1970. Following the bombardment, 500 Khmer Rouge attacked Takh Mau, 6 miles (9.7 km) southeast of the city and killed 25 civilians. The PAVN also lay siege to Prey Veng.

PAVN/VC sappers attacked Tây Ninh Combat Base killing 13 ARVN, while 16 of the attackers were killed. The base was the major support base for ARVN operations in southern Cambodia.

22 March

A PAVN rocket attack on Tây Ninh Combat Base killed two ARVN and five civilians and ignited more than 100,000 gallons of fuel.

PAVN forces were reported to have captured four of the nine RLA positions on Skyline Ridge. RLA sources said that U.S. and Royal Lao Air Force had caused more than 1,000 PAVN casualties and destroyed four tanks and ten trucks.

Thiệu dismissed five senior aides to Defense Minister Nguyễn Văn Vy due to a scandal relating to the Servicemen's Mutual Aid and Savings Fund (SMASF), a government-run and owned pension fund for South Vietnamese military personnel.

22 March - 30 April

The PAVN 101D Regiment attacked the ARVN 42nd Ranger Group at Kompong Trach in Cambodia. Each side reinforced and the fighting continued until the end of April when the ARVN withdrew having inflicted heavy losses on the PAVN 1st Division. The battle was the first phase of the Easter Offensive in southern Cambodia and the Mekong Delta.

23 March

The United States boycotted peace negotiations in Paris with the North Vietnamese, citing the failure of North Vietnam to negotiate seriously.

North Vietnamese sources described the POW issue as a smokescreen being used by Nixon to divert from peace talks and prolong the war.

23 March - 24 October

The Lavelle Affair began when USAF General John D. Lavelle, commander of Seventh Air Force, was accused of breaching the rules of engagement for reconnaissance patrols and "protective reaction" strikes over North Vietnam, allowing the falsifying of records to show that U.S. aircraft had been fired on and so allowing them to hit North Vietnamese targets. Lavelle would be forced to retire as a Major General and was replaced by General John W. Vogt, Jr. on 10 April.

24 March

PAVN/Khmer Rouge sappers blew up the Japanese Bridge in Phnom Penh, collapsing several spans of the only highway bridge across the Tonlé Sap River and killing three civilians. Sappers also sank two barges and a cargo ship moored 1 mile (1.6 km) south of the city.

25 March

PAVN forces captured Phou Phane, 19 miles (31 km) northeast of Luang Prabang.

26 March

ARVN forces killed 106 PAVN for the loss of four ARVN in three clashes near Huế. In the largest battle 15 miles (24 km) southwest of Huế, 85 PAVN were killed by infantry and airstrikes.

27 March

ANK high command claimed that 70 PAVN had been killed in fighting near Paing Kasey, 20 miles (32 km) southwest of Phnom Penh and that two ANK soldiers had been killed.

The PAVN/VC shot down one U.S. and one RVNAF helicopters in the Central Highlands killing one American, while another U.S. helicopter was shot down 22 miles (35 km) northeast of Saigon.

ARVN forces withdrew from the Parrot's Beak, Cambodia to prepare for a new operation.

A USAF HH-53C operated by the 40th Aerospace Rescue and Recovery Squadron crashed in Stoeng Treng Province, Cambodia, about 10 miles (16 km) southeast of Siem Pang District, all five crewmen were killed.

28 March

Six civilians were killed in a terrorist bombing in Phnom Penh.

The U.S. handed over Phan Rang Air Base to the RVNAF.

A USAF AC-130A gunship operated by the 16th Special Operations Squadron was shot down by an SA-2 on a night mission over the Ho Chi Minh Trail in Laos with all 14 crewmen killed.

29 March

Two soldiers from the 3rd Brigade, 1st Cavalry Division were killed by a booby-trap on patrol 31 miles (50 km) east of Saigon. ARVN forces engaged PAVN troops 18 miles (29 km) southwest of Huế, killing 53 PAVN.

30 March

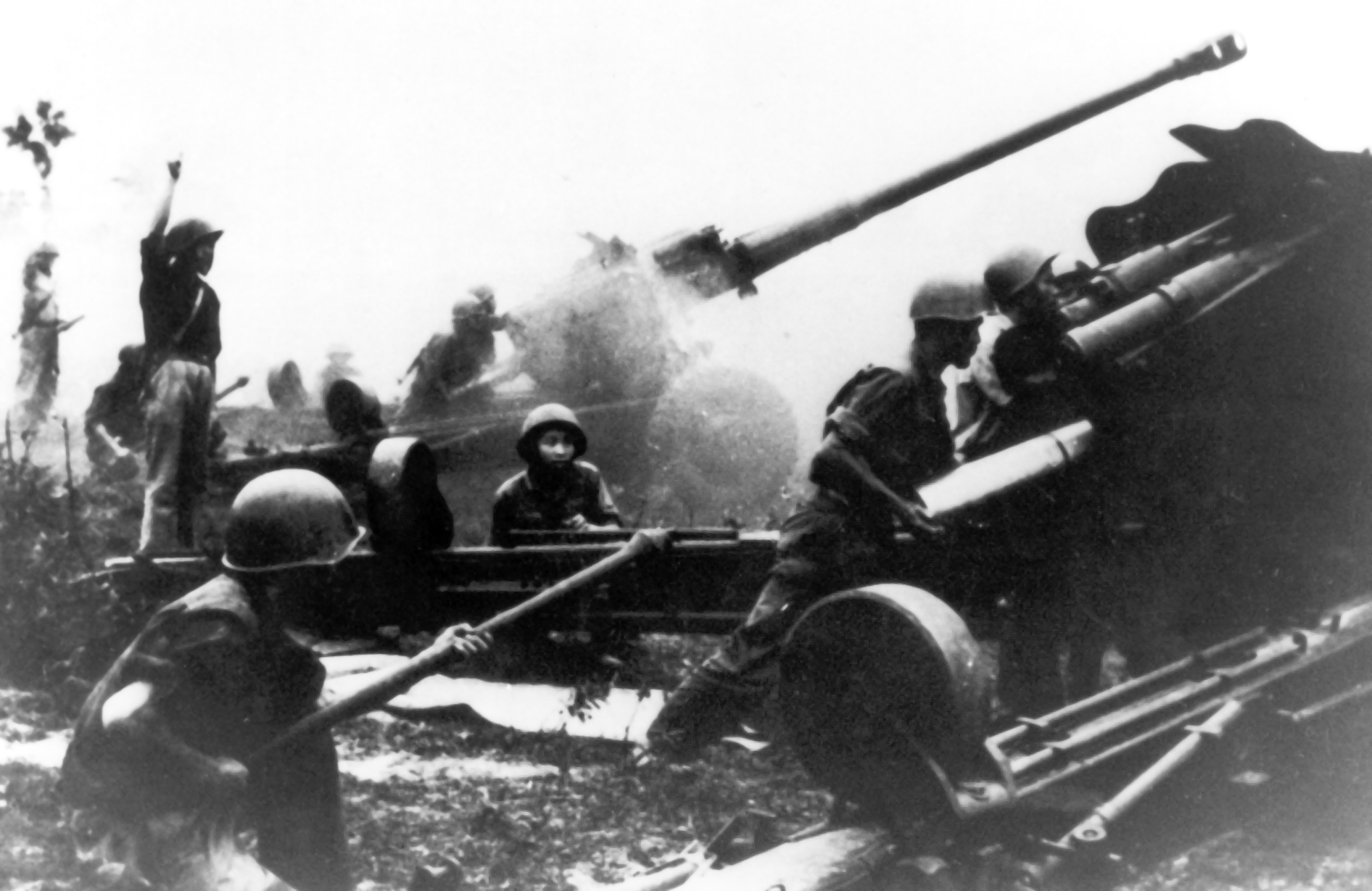
PAVN M46 130mm guns

The long anticipated offensive by the PAVN/VC began. Called the Nguyễn Huệ Offensive or Chiến dịch Xuân hè 1972 in Vietnamese and the Easter Offensive in English, three PAVN divisions (30,000–40,000 men) with support from tanks and artillery crossed the DMZ or came from Laos to the west to attack the ARVN 3rd Division in the First Battle of Quảng Trị. Although a PAVN offensive had been expected, the invasion across the DMZ was a surprise and the ARVN was ill-prepared. Several small firebases were overrun within hours. Storms and cloud cover hindered U.S. and RVNAF air support.

North Vietnam's military objectives in launching what would be a three-pronged offensive were the capture of the cities of Quang Tri in the northern part of South Vietnam, Kontum in the Central Highlands and An Loc in the south. Other objectives were believed to be to impress the North Vietnamese people and the Communist world with its determination, reinvigorate antiwar sentiment in the U.S. and undermine Nixon's reelection chances, disrupt Vietnamization and undermine the Thiệu government and seize territory ahead of any peace settlement.

A USAF AC-130E gunship operated by the 16th Special Operations Squadron was shot down by antiaircraft fire over Laos, but all 15 crewmen survived and were rescued.

31 March

VAL-4, the U.S. Navy's last combat unit in South Vietnam conducted its last mission and was disestablished on 10 April 1972.

== April ==
1-27 April

Operation Fa Ngum was an RLA operation to capture the villages of Ban Ngik and Laongam as bases for incursions onto the Ho Chi Minh Trail. The RLA captured Laongam, but were repulsed by the PAVN in their attacks on Ban Ngik.

2 April

The ARVN 56th Regiment, 3rd Division numbering about 1,500 soldiers at Camp Carroll surrendered to the PAVN. Camp Carroll was important to South Vietnam because of its M107 175 mm artillery with a range of up to 20 miles (32 km). The capture of Camp Carroll gave the PAVN control of western Quảng Trị Province.

With the city of Đông Hà near the DMZ threatened, Nixon authorized U.S. naval vessels offshore to strike at the PAVN with warplanes and naval gunfire.

Captain John Ripley an adviser to the Vietnamese Marines spent three hours under the road bridge at Đông Hà installing demolition charges to destroy the bridge.

2-14 April

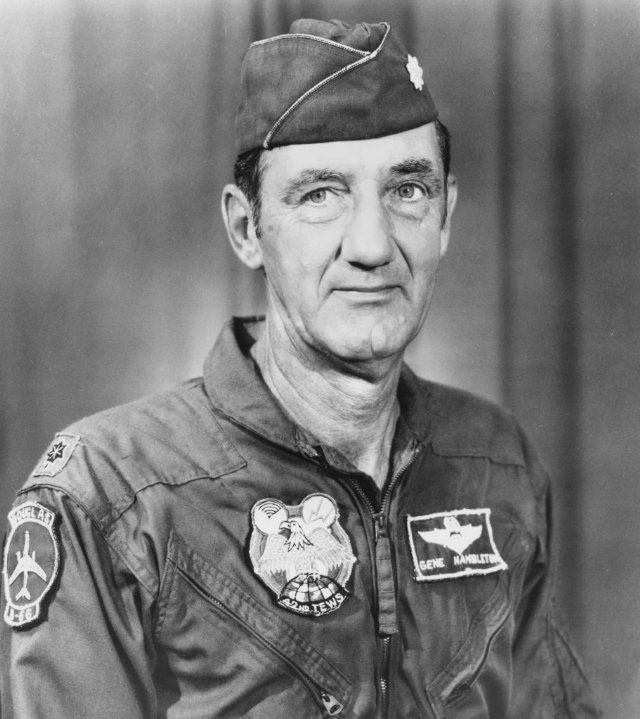
Iceal Hambleton

Lieutenant Colonel Iceal Hambleton was the sole survivor of an EB-66 shot down near Đông Hà. His rescue was the longest and most costly search and rescue mission during the war resulting in the loss of five aircraft, 11 U.S. killed and two captured. The rescue diverted U.S. aircraft from supporting the ARVN in the defense of Quảng Trị Province.

3 April

The U.S. accused North Vietnam of invading South Vietnam in "flagrant violation" of both the 1954 Geneva Accords and the November 1968 understanding that led to the end of Operation Rolling Thunder, the U.S. bombing of North Vietnam and warned that all retaliatory options were open.

Newspapers in Saigon were instructed by the National Press Center that they should only publish the Government's official reports on the fighting in Quảng Trị Province and threatened to take action against UPI for a "completely false" account of the surrender of Camp Carroll.

The RLA reported that it had recaptured three of the four positions on Skyline Ridge that had been lost earlier to the PAVN.

4 April

Nixon authorized increased bombing of PAVN troops in South Vietnam and B-52 strikes against North Vietnam. He said, "These bastards have never been bombed like they're going to be bombed this time."

The PAVN attacked South Vietnamese positions in northern Binh Dinh province from their stronghold in the An Lao Valley. PAVN/VC forces overran many ARVN positions.

The USS Kitty Hawk joined two U.S. Navy aircraft carriers already operating off the coast of Vietnam.

North Vietnam and the VC called for the resumption of the Paris Peace Talks, but this was rejected by the U.S. and South Vietnam with a South Vietnamese spokesman saying "It is ridiculous to talk about wanting to negotiate while carrying out an invasion."

5 April

In a televised address Thiệu stated that the decisive battle for the survival of South Vietnam was underway.

U.S. jets destroyed the Bến Hải River Bridge in the DMZ.

U.S. military sources criticized the defensive mentality of the South Vietnamese noting that ARVN units were retreating and relying on U.S. airpower rather than standing and fighting.

5–7 April

The second prong of the Easter Offensive was the movement across the border from Cambodia of the VC 5th Division and an attack on 4,000 ARVN defenders at the Battle of Loc Ninh. Lộc Ninh was a small district town in Bình Long Province, approximately 75 miles (121 km) north of Saigon. Nearly all of the ARVN defenders were killed or surrendered.

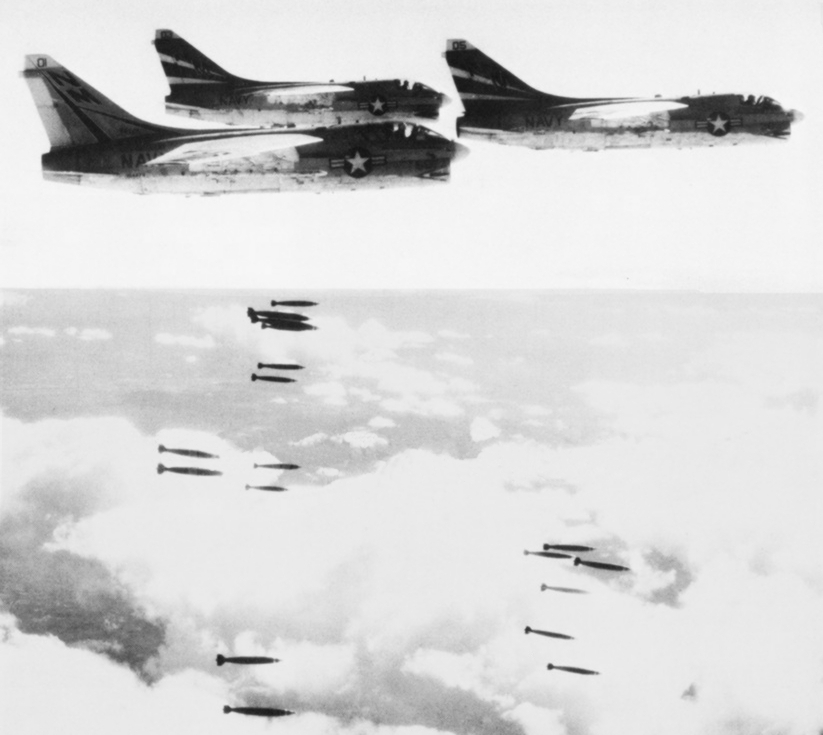
U.S. Navy A-7s bomb North Vietnam

6 April

U.S. aircraft and warships began Operation Freedom Train (later renamed Operation Linebacker) a sustained program of attacks against North Vietnam. The initial targets were SAM sites and troop concentrations in and north of the DMZ.

7 April

Secretary of Defense Melvin Laird stated that the U.S. would continue bombing North Vietnam until it withdrew its forces that had invaded South Vietnam and showed interest in "serious" peace negotiations.

North Vietnam appealed to the French government to use its influence with the U.S. to try to stop the bombing of North Vietnam.

The New York Times reported that the North Vietnamese invasion had stirred anger and patriotism among South Vietnamese.

8 April

After capturing Lộc Ninh, PAVN/VC soldiers succeeded in surrounding the city of An Lộc, the capital of Bình Long Province and the objective of the southern prong of the Easter Offensive. The city was defended by the ARVN 5th Division who would henceforth be supplied and reinforced by air in the Battle of An Lộc.

The USS Constellation joined three U.S. Navy aircraft carriers already operating off the coast of Vietnam.

Abrams and Bunker advised the White House and the Pentagon that the PAVN offensive was likely to last for months and would only end when their objectives, believed to be the capture of Quảng Trị and Thừa Thiên provinces had been achieved or they were defeated.

PAVN/VC units attacked Cam Ranh Base killing three Americans and Nui Ba Den killing two Americans.

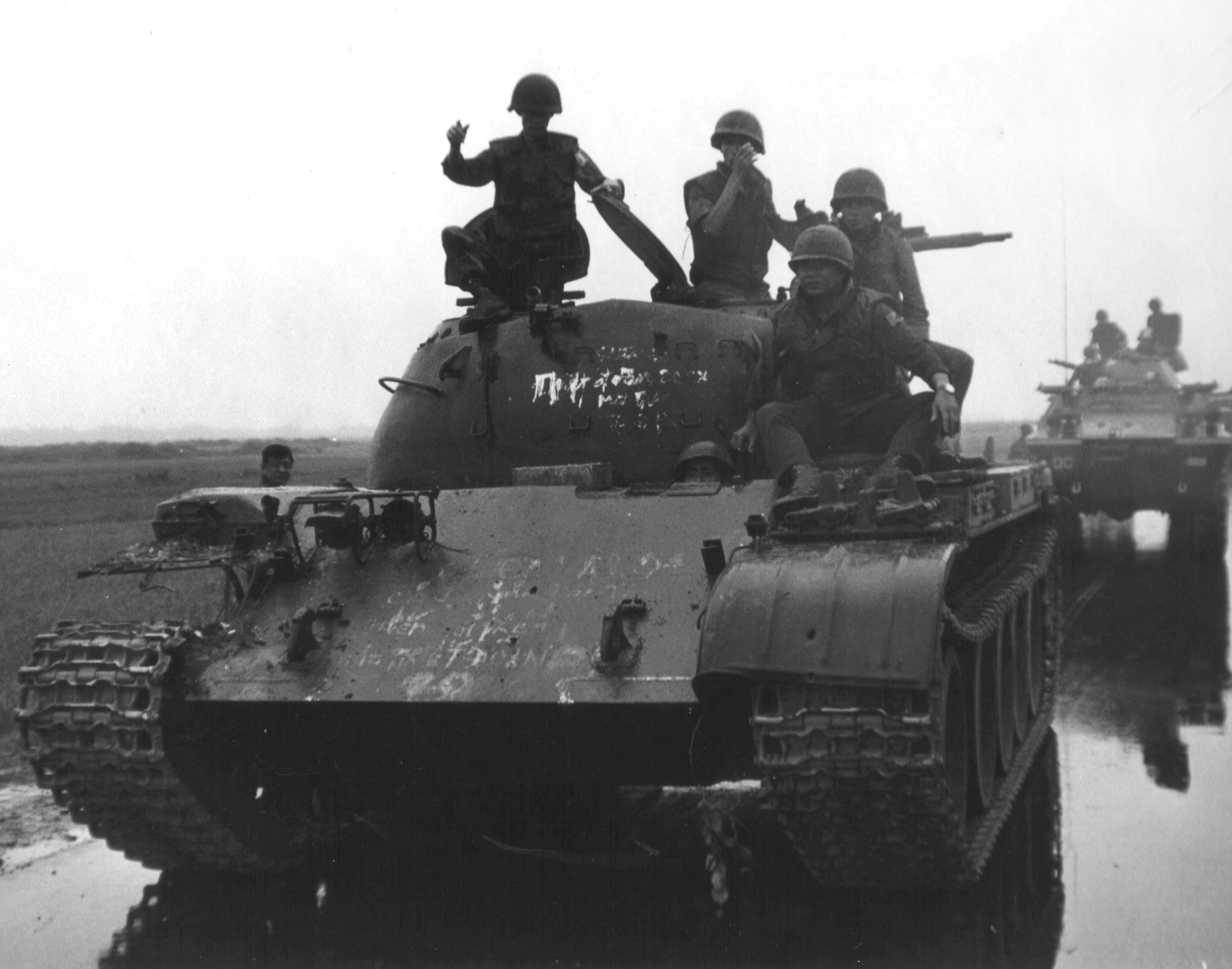
South Vietnamese troops with a captured Type 59 tank.

9 April

In Washington, Secretary of State Henry Kissinger warned Soviet Ambassador Anatoli Dobrynin that the U.S. might take "drastic measures to end the [Vietnam] war once and for all."

At dawn 2,000 PAVN launched an attack, led by tanks, against Firebase Pedro southwest of Quảng Trị. The PAVN tanks had outrun their infantry support and nine tanks were lost in a minefield around Pedro. An ARVN armored task force of eight M48s and 12 M113s from the ARVN 20th Tank Regiment were despatched from Ái Tử Combat Base to support the Marines at Pedro. At the same time a flight of RVNAF A-1 Skyraiders arrived overhead and destroyed five tanks. When the ARVN armor arrived they destroyed five T-54s for no losses and captured one tank.

The JGS ordered the 21st Division to move north to support the Battle of An Lộc as all of South Vietnam's reserve forces were already committed to containing the PAVN offensive.

U.S. intelligence analysts said that all but one PAVN division had been committed to the offensive.

Total PAVN losses during the attacks on Firebase Pedro, Đông Hà and Hải Lăng District were more than 1,000 killed and 30 tanks destroyed. A further 182 PAVN were killed in an attack on Firebase Bastogne/Phu Xuan for the loss of nine ARVN. I Corps commander General Hoàng Xuân Lãm stated "This was the big battle. We have defeated them." and claimed that the PAVN advance had been stopped.

The PAVN 12th Regiment, 3rd Division cut Route 19 8 miles (13 km) east of An Khê.

10 April

For the first time since 1967, U.S. B-52s bombed North Vietnam. Their priority targets were SAM sites described as "the most sophisticated air defenses in the history of air warfare.

Nixon said that big powers had a special responsibility to discourage countries from attacking neighbouring countries, while the State Department said the offensive would not be possible without the Soviet Union supplying North Vietnam with sophisticated weapons.

The aircraft carrier USS Midway was ordered to Vietnam.

11 April

The PAVN lay siege to Firebase Bastogne/Phu Xuan losing 102 killed as an ARVN armored column tried for the third day to relieve the base. In fighting at Kampong Trach, Cambodia the ARVN killed 251 PAVN for the loss of seven ARVN killed.

North Vietnam stated that "every Vietnamese citizen has the right and duty to fight the American aggressor anywhere on Vietnamese territory." while continuing to claim that no North Vietnamese forces were fighting in South Vietnam. North Vietnam again called for a resumption of the Paris Peace Talks and demanded that the U.S. stop bombing and other "acts of aggression."

Two more squadrons of B-52s were ordered to be deployed to Indochina, increasing the number to more than 130, the highest at any point of the war. In addition the United States Atlantic Fleet aircraft carrier USS Saratoga was ordered to deploy to Vietnam.

11-26 April

South Korean soldiers won their bloodiest battle of the war at An Khe Pass, dislodging PAVN forces to reopen a key supply route. Officially, 75 ROK were killed and another 222 wounded, but this number was disputed by veterans and CNN, with the latter alleging that actual casualties were double the official figures.

12 April

A PAVN rocket attack on Da Nang Air Base killed 14 civilians and destroyed a USAF EC-47.

Approximately 50 men from Company C, 2nd Battalion 1st Infantry Regiment which had been flown into Phu Bai Combat Base from Danang to provide base security the previous day, refused to go on a combat patrol in the hills west of Phu Bai, but eventually undertook the patrol. The 2nd Battalion commander Lieutenant colonel Frederick P. Mitchell blamed television newsmen and journalists for inciting the combat refusal.

13 April

The United States Senate voted 68–16 to approve the War Powers Act, which would limit the power of the President to commit American forces to hostilities without Congressional approval. The legislation then moved on to the House.

After two B-52 strikes around Firebase Bastogne/Phu Xuan, the ARVN relief force reported finding 210 PAVN dead.

In fighting in Kampong Trach the ARVN reported killing 127 PAVN for the loss of 13 ARVN.

13 April – 20 July

After several days of artillery strikes, the PAVN 9th Division attacked An Lộc supported by 40 tanks. They captured the northern half of the city but the ARVN defenders held the rest supported by heavy U.S. air attacks. The Battle of An Lộc became a siege that lasted for 66 days and culminated in a victory for South Vietnam. North Vietnam devoted 35,000 soldiers to the battle and siege. The victory at An Lộc halted the PAVN advance towards Saigon.

14 April

South Vietnam reported more than 107 individual attacks across the county in the preceding 24 hours, the highest level since the 1968 Tet Offensive. A rocket attack on Tan Son Nhut International Airport killed 15 civilians while a rocket attack on Danang killed 13 civilians.

The U.S. expanded B-52 strikes across the North Vietnam up to 200 miles (320 km) north of the DMZ.

The ARVN abandoned Firebase Charlie (14.576°N 107.778°E) 10 km from Dak To after it was attacked by the PAVN 320th Division.

15 April

ARVN 3rd Division troops began some limited counterattacks in Quảng Trị province. Rocket and artillery attacks on Danang killed 39 civilians and destroyed one U.S. helicopter at Marble Mountain Air Facility.

Democratic senators Hubert Humphrey, Edward Kennedy and Edmund Muskie criticized the expanded U.S. bombing, saying it jeopardized the U.S. exiting the war.

The USS Worden operating in the Gulf of Tonkin was accidentally hit by two AGM-45 Shrike anti-radiation missiles fired by U.S. aircraft, killing one crewmember.

15–17 April

The U.S. carried out heavy B-52 and fighter bomber strikes against Hanoi and Haiphong in Operation Freedom Porch. Nixon said, "we really left them our calling card this weekend."

15–20 April

Anti-war demonstrators protested the bombing of North Vietnam throughout the United States. Hundreds of protesters were arrested.

16 April

The Soviet Union formally protested the U.S. bombing of North Vietnam, warning that it would aggravate the situation in Indochina and internationally. The Soviet's claimed that four of their ships had been hit in the raids on Haiphong, the U.S. rejected the protest and denied responsibility saying that nations that provided offensive weapons to North Vietnam shared responsibility for Hanoi's actions.

Zhou Enlai condemned the U.S. bombing saying that the U.S. had "embarked again on the old track of war escalation."

USAF jets shot down three VPAF MiG-21s southwest of Hanoi while escorting U.S. bombing missions.

17 April

Testifying before the Senate Foreign Relations Committee, Secretary of State Rogers defended the bombing of Hanoi and Haiphong stating that the Nixon Administration would take "whatever military action is necessary" to stop the North's "massive invasion" of the South.

The USS Buchanan was hit by PAVN coastal artillery on Hon Mat Island near Vinh, killing one crewman.

18 April

Testifying before the Senate Foreign Relations Committee, Secretary of Defense Laird said that bombing of North Vietnam would continue as long as the invasion lasted and didn't rule out blockading or mining Haiphong harbor.

ARVN relief forces approaching Firebase Bastogne/Phu Xuan reported approximately 400 PAVN and 21 ARVN killed in fighting 4 miles (6.4 km) east of the base.

The South Vietnamese reported that more than 200 PAVN/VC had been killed in attacks on outposts south of Danang in the previous four days.

Hanoi reported that 47 civilians had been killed in Haiphong and 13 in Hanoi in the recent U.S. bombing raids.

19 April

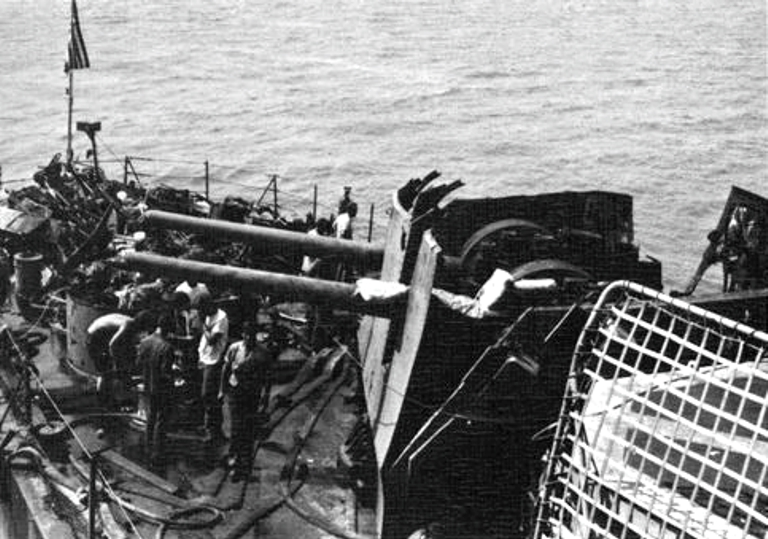
Gun mount of USS Higbee destroyed in the Battle of Đồng Hới

Several VPAF MiG-17Fs attacked U.S. Navy warships in the Battle of Đồng Hới. This was the first air attack on U.S. warships of the war. A gun mount on the USS Higbee was destroyed. The U.S. Navy sunk two P 4/6 class motor torpedo boats and shot down one MiG-17 and also engaged shore batteries in North Vietnam.

PAVN force overran Hoài Ân District in Bình Định province after the ARVN defenders fled.

PAVN forces captured most of Kompong Trabek, Cambodia, on Route 1 50 miles (80 km) east of Phnom Penh.

The presidents of the eight Ivy League colleges and Massachusetts Institute of Technology issued a joint statement criticizing the renewed U.S. bombing and supporting peaceful antiwar demonstrations.

20 April

South Vietnam announced its highest weekly casualties since the Tet Offensive, losing 1002 killed and 408 while claiming 7,117 PAVN/VC killed and 71 captured.

The PAVN captured a 50 miles (80 km) stretch of Route 1 in Svay Rieng province, Cambodia. At Kompong Trabek more than 450 soldiers of the ANK 58th Brigade were reported to have been killed or captured with only 50 soldiers from the unit escaping.

The PAVN 325C Division, North Vietnam's last combat division, was reported to be moving through the DMZ into South Vietnam, leaving only two training divisions in North Vietnam.

North Vietnam and the VC again called for the U.S. to resume the Paris Peace Talks with no precondition of a bombing halt.

The U.S. State Department claimed that North Vietnam was trying to rewrite history by denying the existence of an understanding that North Vietnam would show restraint in return for the November 1968 U.S. bombing halt.

21–25 April

Kissinger visited Moscow and met with General Secretary of the Communist Party of the Soviet Union Leonid Brezhnev to prepare for an upcoming summit meeting between Nixon and Brezhnev. Nixon instructed Kissinger that his top priority was to get Soviet cooperation in seeking an agreement to end hostilities in South Vietnam. Brezhnev said he would use Soviet influence but he could not dictate to North Vietnam.

22 April

South Vietnam reported the heaviest fighting in 18 months in the Mekong Delta where PAVN/VC had attacked numerous government outposts and overrun up to half of Chương Thiện province.

100,000 people in various cities around the U.S. protested the increased bombing of North Vietnam.

23 April

The PAVN used AT-3 Sagger anti-tank guided missiles for the first time in combat, attacking the ARVN 20th Tank Regiment west of Đông Hà, destroying one M48A3 and one M113 armored cavalry assault vehicle (ACAV) and damaging a second ACAV.

Military sources in Saigon said that the South Vietnamese had suffered approximately 10,000 casualties in the offensive so far, including about 3,000 killed while the PAVN/VC were estimated to have lost more than 13,000 killed.

Reports from the "liberated" town of Lộc Ninh said that the PAVN/VC had imprisoned all South Vietnamese government officials and ARVN officers and non-commissioned officers and executed three of them. All private vehicles were confiscated and a rubber plantation's rice stores were trucked to Snuol, Cambodia.

23–24 April

After preliminary encounters, the third prong of the Easter Offensive began in the Central Highlands. The PAVN 2nd Division supported by tanks attacked the ARVN 47th Regiment, 22nd Division at Tân Cảnh Base Camp. By nightfall on 24 April, the PAVN had overrun Tan Canh and nearby Dak To II Base Camp and the 22nd Division had disintegrated.

24 April

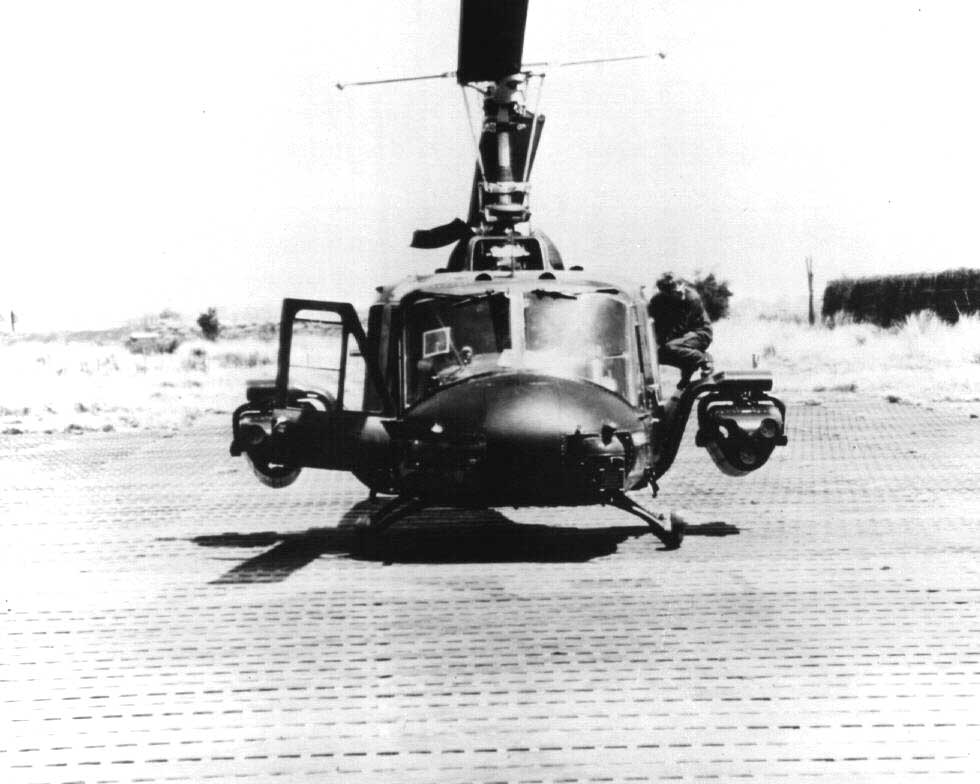
UH-1B with XM26 TOW weapons system

The U.S. 1st Combat Aerial TOW Team arrived in South Vietnam to test the new BGM-71 TOW anti-armor missile under combat conditions. The team consisted of two UH-1B helicopters each mounting the XM26 TOW weapons system.

Da Nang Air Base was hit by PAVN 122mm rockets prompting a call for Marines to provide base security and on 25 May the 3rd Battalion, 9th Marines was deployed to the base.

Seven crewmen from the USS Nitro jumped overboard as the ship departed Naval Weapons Station Earle for South Vietnam in protest against the war. The sailors were picked up by a United States Coast Guard vessel and returned to the Nitro.

A Republic of Vietnam Navy destroyer sank a 100 feet (30 m) North Vietnamese trawler carrying munitions near Phú Quốc and rescued 16 of the 22 man crew.

25 April

PAVN/VC forces attacked the remnants of the ARVN 42nd Regiment, 22nd Division at Hoài Nhơn in Bình Định province, which combined with the attacks towards Kontum threatened to cut South Vietnam in half.

The U.S. and South Vietnam announced they were willing to resume the Paris Peace Talks on 27 April with the first matter for discussion being ending "the flagrant North Vietnamese invasion of South Vietnam."

The VC 48th Battalion was reported to have destroyed 23 villages around the Batangan Peninsula, killing 23 civilians and making a further 30,000 homeless in an attempt to disrupt South Vietnamese pacification efforts. Among the villages destroyed were two housing survivors of the Mỹ Lai massacre.

PAVN forces supported by ten tanks besieged the city of Svay Rieng, Cambodia.

26 April

In a televised address Nixon announced that U.S. troop numbers would be reduced by 20,000 to 49,000 by 1 July despite the ongoing North Vietnamese offensive. He said that U.S. actions were aimed to achieve "peace with honor" in Vietnam.

27 April

The PAVN began a renewed assault in Quảng Trị province. The U.S. accused North Vietnam of acting in bad faith by renewing their offensive on the same day that the Paris Peace Talks resumed.

The PAVN captured Firebase Dunglieu 60 miles (97 km) east of Kontum. Meanwhile, an ARVN convoy succeeded in reaching Pleiku after ARVN and South Korean troops cleared the PAVN roadblock on Route 19.

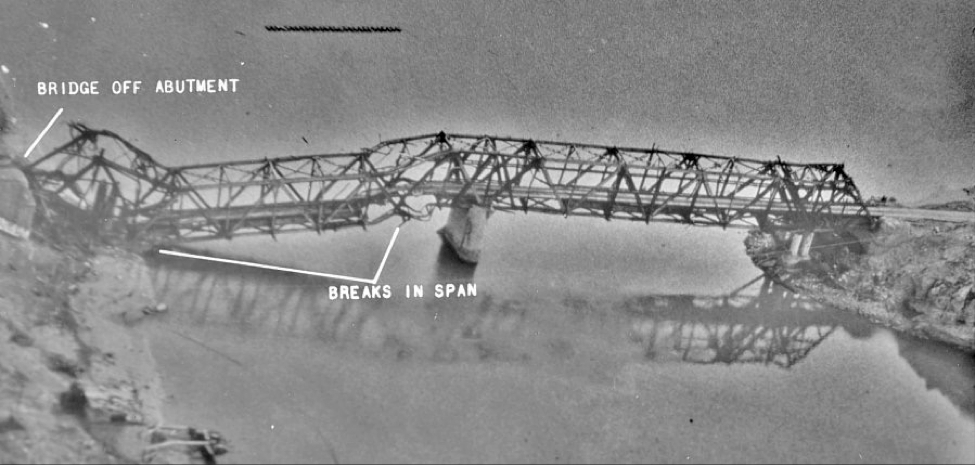
Thanh Hoa Bridge after being hit by laser-guided bombs

USAF jets knocked down one of the spans of the Thanh Hóa Bridge using Paveway Laser-guided bombs. The bridge had withstood 871 previous sorties.

The JGS reported that in the preceding week they had suffered the highest casualties of the war losing 1,149 killed and 3,376 wounded while PAVN/VC losses were 4,890 killed.

The United States Joint Chiefs of Staff assessed the performance of South Vietnamese armed forces thus far in the Easter offensive as "encouraging."

28 April

The commander of the 20th Tank Regiment withdrew from Đông Hà to deal with a PAVN force threatening Ái Tử Combat Base. Seeing the tanks leaving, the soldiers of the 57th Regiment, 3rd Division panicked and abandoned their positions leading to the collapse of the ARVN defensive line.

The first kill was made by a PAVN SA-7 Man-portable air-defense system.

A senior U.S. officer described the performance of the ARVN 22nd Division as "inadequate" as PAVN forces closed in on Kontum and Pleiku.

29 April

At 02:00 the PAVN attacked the ARVN positions north and south of Đông Hà Combat Base and the ARVN defenses of Quảng Trị began to crumble. The PAVN captured Đông Hà later that day.

PAVN forces captured Firebase Bastogne/Tho Xuan and its defenders withdrew east to Firebase Birmingham.

PAVN/VC forces overran Bồng Sơn after its defenders, militiamen and soldiers from the ARVN 42nd Regiment, 22nd Division fled in the face of mortar fire and infantry attacks. One U.S. adviser said "there was a lot of valor by some individuals and a lot of cowardice."

29-30 April

More than 10,000 South Vietnamese soldiers and civilians were evacuated by helicopter from Kontum to Pleiku.

29 April - 2 May

Approximately 2,000 South Vietnamese civilians were killed by indiscriminate PAVN artillery fire as they fled Quảng Trị along Highway 1.

30 April

At midday Giai ordered a withdrawal from Ái Tử to a defensive line along the south of the Thạch Hãn River and the withdrawal was completed late that day.

ARVN and ANK forces abandoned Bavet and Kampong Trach in Svay Rieng province, leaving only Svay Rieng under Cambodian control.

== May ==
1 May

Giai decided that any further defense of Quảng Trị was pointless and that the ARVN should withdraw to a defensive line along the Mỹ Chánh River. The PAVN then captured Quảng Trị, the only provincial capital to fall to them during the Easter Offensive.

The PAVN captured Tam Quan in Bình Định province and besieged the ARVN 40th Regiment at Landing Zone English. The 40th Regiment, supposed to number 3,000 soldiers had been reduced 40% by desertion and 30% by casualties in what was described as a failure of Vietnamization.

RLA forces recaptured all of Skyline Ridge from the PAVN.

Radio Hanoi said that the DMZ was not a border and that the movement of forces across it did not constitute an invasion, saying that "All Vietnamese have the right and duty to defend Vietnam against the aggressor who came 10,000 miles across the ocean to invade our land."

60,000 people protested the U.S. bombing in Stockholm, Sweden.

2 May

The ARVN 3rd Division disintegrated with many of its soldiers fleeing down Route 1 towards Huế, while South Vietnamese Marines held onto defensive positions north of Huế. That evening, following intense artillery fire and ground attacks the ARVN abandoned Firebase Nancy and fell back to the Mỹ Chánh Line. North Vietnam claimed that the Allies had suffered more than 10,000 casualties in the fighting in Quảng Trị province.

The ARVN 40th Regiment abandoned Landing Zone English and fled 4 miles (6.4 km) east to the coast where they were picked up Republic of Vietnam Navy landing craft. The PAVN now controlled the northern third of Bình Định province.

In the first combat kill using the TOW missile the U.S. 1st Combat Aerial TOW Team destroyed an American-made M41 operated by the PAVN near An Lộc.

The Pulitzer Prize for Public Service was awarded to The New York Times for publication of the Pentagon Papers.

3 May

Thousands of deserters from the ARVN 3rd Division looted Huế where they burned the central market and harassed civilians. The troops blamed their officers for abandoning them in the evacuation of Quảng Trị.

Lieutenant General Ngô Quang Trưởng assumed command of I Corps replacing the ineffectual General Hoàng Xuân Lãm. Lãm claimed that he had resigned and blamed his subordinates for ignoring his orders, saying that he had ordered Quảng Trị to be held. Meanwhile, Giai was relieved of command and placed under investigation.

U.S. advisers and officials blamed the poor performance of the ARVN on poor leadership and the system of patronage that rewarded loyalty rather than skill.

4 May

Trưởng met with Thiệu in Huế. In a televised speech Trưởng pledged to defend Huế, called on civilians not to evacuate, announced that there would be no further evacuation of military dependents and threatened capital punishment for any deserters.

More than 200,000 refugees were estimated to be in Danang with a further 30,000 still moving down Route 1 towards the city from Huế.

The USS Saratoga was ordered on station off Vietnam, bringing the number of U.S. aircraft carriers to six. A further 50 strike aircraft were ordered to Indochina, bring total strength to more than 1,000 aircraft.

USAF aircraft began flying replacement M48 tanks into Danang Air Base from Japan to replace those lost in Quảng Trị.

The Paris Peace Talks were suspended indefinitely after the United States and South Vietnam pulled out because of "a lack of progress".

The VC announced the establishment of a "provisional revolutionary administration" in Quảng Trị and called for all South Vietnamese military, police and government officials to turn themselves in.

5 May

Firebase Birmingham was shelled by the PAVN and in two clashes 2 miles (3.2 km) west and southwest of the base, 39 PAVN and two ARVN were killed. The PAVN also closed Route 14 between Pleiku and Kontum. U.S. troops from the 196th Light Infantry Brigade engaged PAVN forces on "Charlie Ridge" 15 miles (24 km) southwest of Danang suffering two wounded.

The Pentagon announced that U.S. Marines might be landed to defend the withdrawal of U.S. forces from South Vietnam, as only about 6,000 of the more than 60,000 Americans remaining were combat troops, however any renewed ground combat responsibility was ruled out.

6 May

The PAVN attacked Firebase 42 3 miles (4.8 km) north of Pleiku, which was the headquarters of the ARVN 2nd Airborne Brigade and the 44th and 45th Regiments, 23rd Division. The attack was repulsed with 35 PAVN, more than 50 ARVN and one U.S. adviser killed. The South Vietnamese government announced that all 30,000 civilians in Kontum would be evacuated by road south to Pleiku.

The PAVN fired 115 rockets, mortar and recoilless rifle rounds into Phnom Penh, killing two civilians and wounding 44. They then unsuccessfully attacked the Monivong Bridge just 1 mile (1.6 km) south of the U.S. Embassy.

U.S. Navy fighters shot down two MiG-21s and a Mig-17 in dogfights southwest of Hanoi.

The U.S. began reopening Takhli Royal Thai Air Force Base which they had closed in April 1971.

United Press International photographer David Hume Kennerly was awarded the Pulitzer Prize for Feature Photography for his photos taken in Cambodia and South Vietnam.

6-9 May

From midday on 6 May the PAVN began an intensive bombardment of Polei Kleng Camp with over 500 rounds systematically destroying the base bunkers and an infantry assault by the PAVN 64th Regiment penetrated the perimeter. The attack was repulsed and the ARVN continued to hold for a further 3 days during which time U.S. airpower, including gunships and 16 B-52 strikes, was concentrated on the attacking PAVN. On the night of 7 May the PAVN attempted another assault but were again repulsed suffering 300 killed. On the morning of 9 May the ARVN abandoned the base in the face of a PAVN tank and infantry assault, only 97 ARVN and their dependents reaching safety in Kontum.

8 May

Nixon withdrew his demand for a withdrawal of all North Vietnamese forces from South Vietnam as a precondition for a peace agreement. Nixon proposed that all U.S. POWs be released and an internationally supervised cease fire take place. The U.S. would cease bombing and withdraw from South Vietnam within six months after those conditions were met.

Nixon also announced Operation Pocket Money, the mining of Haiphong and other North Vietnamese harbors, calculating correcting that he could take such a step without endangering the U.S.'s improving relationships with China and the Soviet Union. The mines would activate in three days allowing ships in port time to leave Nixon's action inspired an outbreak of anti-Vietnam War protests around the U.S. with 1,800 arrests of protesters reported.

Hanoi accused the U.S. of bombing dikes and other civilian targets in a series of raids 15 miles (24 km) west of Hanoi.

Rear Admiral Rembrandt C. Robinson and two others were killed when their helicopter crashed while landing on USS Providence in the Gulf of Tonkin. He was the only U.S. Navy Flag officer killed in the war.

9 May

The PAVN 203rd Tank Regiment attacked Ben Het Camp. ARVN Rangers destroyed the first three PT-76 tanks with BGM-71 TOW missiles, thereby breaking up the attack. The Rangers spent the rest of the day stabilising the perimeter ultimately destroying 11 tanks and killing over 100 PAVN.

North Vietnam accused the U.S. of breaching the 1954 Geneva Accords and the November 1968 by the renewed bombing of North Vietnam and mining of North Vietnamese ports.

The Soviet Union and China condemned the mining of North Vietnamese harbors and the continued U.S. bombing.

Senate Democrats voted 29:14 to disapprove "the escalation of the war."

10 May

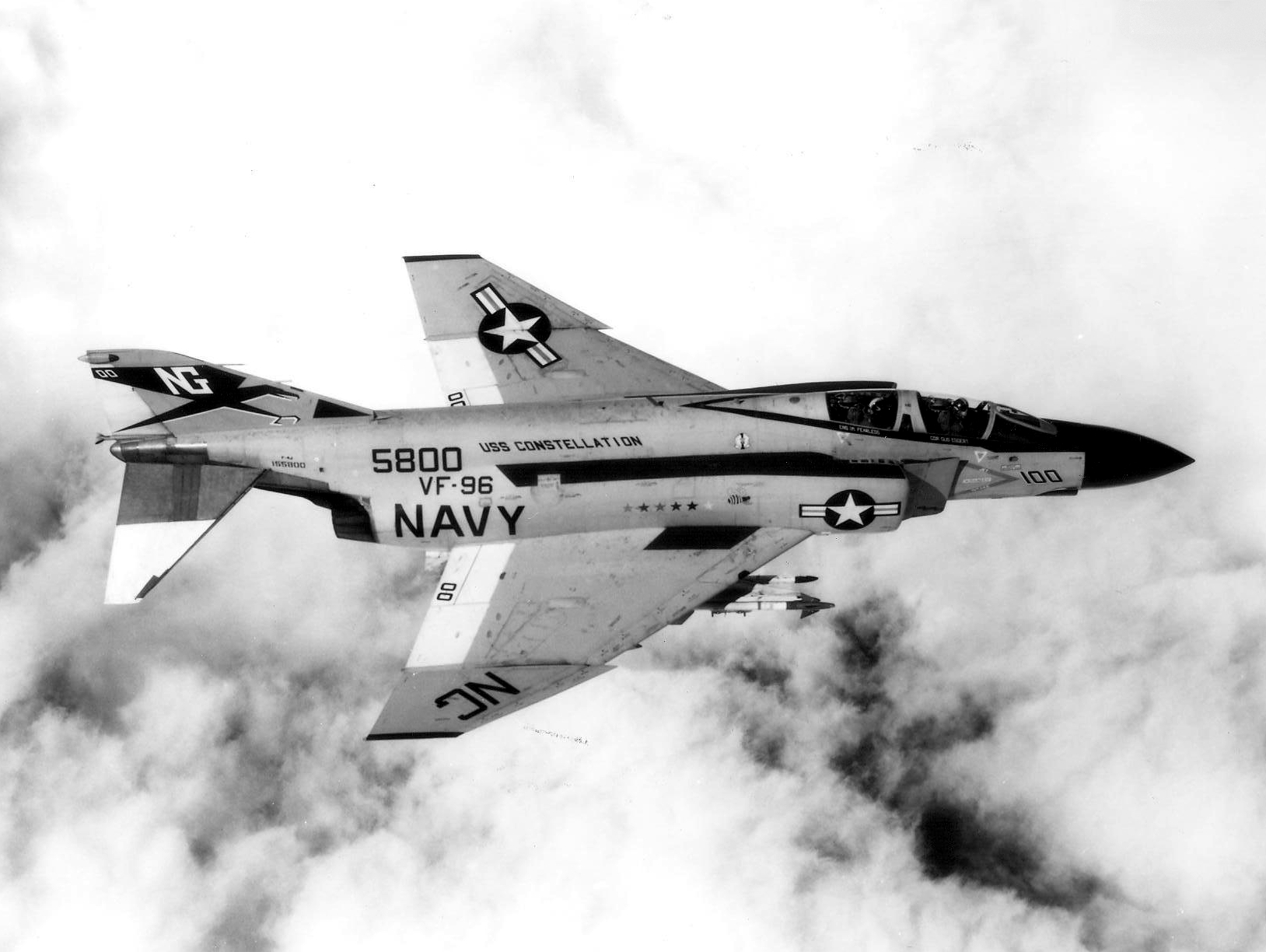
F-4J of VF-96 flown by Lieutenants Cunningham and Driscoll

Lieutenant Duke Cunningham and Lieutenant William P. Driscoll of VF-96 become the only U.S. Navy aces of the war scoring their third, fourth and fifth kills of MiG-17s in a single mission. Their F-4J was then hit by a SAM-2 missile and they ejected successfully over the Gulf of Tonkin and were rescued.

U.S. aircraft achieve their highest number of aerial kills of the war, downing 11 VPAF jets (seven MiG-17s and four MiG-21s) while supporting bombing missions across North Vietnam. U.S. jets damaged the Paul Doumer Bridge in Hanoi with laser-guided bombs rendering it unusable.

A U.S. Army CH-47A crashed near Bearcat Base killing all 34 on board.

Thieu declared martial law. He also replaced II Corps commander Lieutenant general Ngô Du with Major general Nguyễn Văn Toàn.

11 May

The PAVN 5th and 9th Divisions launched a massive infantry and armor assault on An Lộc. This attack was repulsed by a combination of U.S. airpower and ARVN soldiers on the ground. A B-52 strike took place every 55 minutes for 30 hours straight—using 170 B-52s. Despite this air support, the PAVN made gains, and reached within a few hundred meters of the ARVN 5th Division command post.

USAF First Lieutenant Michael Blassie of the 8th Special Operations Squadron was killed when his A-37B Dragonfly was shot down near An Lộc. His remains and some personal effects were recovered from the crash site by the ARVN five months later and turned over to the U.S. military. The remains were later reclassified as unknown and on 17 May 1984 his remains were designated as the Vietnam Unknown service member. On 28 May 1984 his remains were entombed at Arlington National Cemetery. The remains were exhumed on 14 May 1998 and identified as Blassie through DNA testing. Later in 1998 he was reburied at Jefferson Barracks National Cemetery.

The South Vietnamese government ordered all universities closed, the lowering of the draft age from 19 to 17, the recall of 45,000 draftees and a 23:00 to 05:00 curfew.

12 May

The PAVN launched new attacks in an effort to take An Lộc, but again failed.

China condemned the mining of North Vietnamese ports and pledged ongoing support for North Vietnam.

Speaking in Paris, Lê Đức Thọ claimed that North Vietnam and the VC did not want to impose a Communist or socialist government in Saigon as that would "not reflect the reality of the situation."

13 May

South Vietnamese Marines conducted Operation Song Than 5-72, with two battalions landing in USMC helicopters in the Hải Lăng district and then moving south where they engaged the PAVN 66th Regiment and then returned to the Mỹ Chánh Line. The operation resulted in 240 PAVN killed, three tanks destroyed and two 130mm guns put out of action.

The U.S. completed the destruction of the Thanh Hóa Bridge with laser-guided bombs. The U.S. had first bombed the 540-foot-long (160 m) concrete and steel structure in 1965.

A Harris Poll found that 59% of Americans supported the mining of North Vietnam, while 24% disapproved and 17% were unsure.

14 May

Approximately 4,000 ARVN 1st Division troops supported by artillery and B-52 strikes advanced west along Route 547 coming to within 0.5 miles (0.80 km) of Firebase Bastogne and killed 110 PAVN.

14–16 May

In one of the largest and most intense battles of the Easter Offensive, PAVN forces assaulted the city of Kontum and the nearby South Vietnamese base in the Battle of Kontum. Intensive U.S. airstrikes helped the ARVN fend off the PAVN and retain control of the city and nearby area although fighting in the area would continue.

15 May

ARVN 1st Division forces recaptured Firebase Bastogne.

The U.S. disclosed that mining operations included canals and other inland waterways.

Cam Ranh Base was transferred to the South Vietnamese. That night PAVN sappers entered the base and blew up more than 1,000 tons of ammunition.

United States Army Vietnam was merged with MACV to become USARV/MACV Support Command.

16 May

MACV announced that U.S. airstrikes over the preceding five days had destroyed all pumping stations in the southern panhandle of North Vietnam, effectively cutting the fuel supply pipeline to South Vietnam.

U.S. aircraft attacked Bach Mai Airfield, the VPAF air defense command and control center in Hanoi and destroyed several buildings.

Eight Soviet vessels comprising one cruiser, six destroyers, a tanker and an attack submarines were reported to be operating near the Paracel Islands 200 miles (320 km) off the Vietnamese coast as 13 Soviet bloc merchant ships were en route to Haiphong.

120 antiwar protesters were arrested during a sit-in at the United States Capitol rotunda.

17 May

Preceded by B-52 strikes which were reported to have killed 300 PAVN, ARVN Airborne and 21st Division troops advanced up Route 13 to within 2 miles (3.2 km) of An Lộc.

A USAF C-130E was hit by a PAVN 122mm rocket as it took off from Kontum Airfield and crashed killing four Americans.

ARVN forces killed 97 PAVN for the loss of six killed in a battle near Đức Thành, Phước Tuy province.

USS Oklahoma City sank ten North Vietnamese supply vessels and damaged 20 others near Cửa Việt Base.

North Vietnam claimed that it was removing U.S. mines from Haiphong harbor as soon as they were dropped and that shipping was moving unimpeded.

Operation Enhance began with the objective of replacing material and equipment expended or lost by South Vietnam during the Easter Offensive. From May to October under Operation Enhance, the U.S. provided the South Vietnamese armed forces with artillery and anti-tank weapons, 69 helicopters, 55 jet fighters, 100 other aircraft and seven patrol boats.

Vice President Spiro T. Agnew, Ambassador Ellsworth Bunker and Abrams met with Thieu.

18 May

The last two Soviet ships bound for Haiphong diverted to other ports in a sign that the Soviets did not wish to confront the U.S. over the closure of North Vietnamese ports. Soviet supplies to North Vietnam were instead being transported by rail from China.

PAVN/Pathet Lao forces captured Khong Sedone 30 miles (48 km) north of Pakse after a 12 hour battle.

Testifying before the House Foreign Affairs Committee, former Secretary of Defense Clark Clifford said that bombing North Vietnam was prolonging the war and risked bringing in the Soviet Union.

19 May

ARVN Airborne, 9th and 21st Division forces fought a series of battles along Route 13 to clear the way to An Lộc.

20 May

PAVN forces attacked the ARVN 53rd Regiment 3 miles (4.8 km) north of Kontum. Supported by tanks and helicopter gunships the ARVN regained their positions.

PAVN infantry supported by tanks attacked the ARVN relief column on Route 13 south of An Lộc.

21-2 May

The PAVN mounted a full-scale armor and infantry attack on the Mỹ Chánh Line in an attempt to regain the initiative and succeeded in crossing the river and forcing back the 369th Marine Brigade. After fighting all day the Marines had regained most of the lost ground. On the 22nd the PAVN supported by 25 tanks, overran the forward Marine battalion, but not before the Marines had destroyed eight tanks with M72 LAWs and direct artillery fire. The PAVN continued to advance but were met by further missile fire losing ten tanks and armored personnel carriers and the 8th Marine Battalion then counterattacked forcing the PAVN to retreat back across the river.

22-9 May

Nixon began a state visit to the Soviet Union. The visit was part of his strategy to improve relations with both the Soviet Union and China in order to pressure North Vietnam to accept peace on terms acceptable to the United States.

23 May

U.S. jets bombed power plants at Hongai and Nam Định and shot down five VPAF MiGs.

The 39th Rangers captured two SA-7 missile launchers, one was immediately sent to the U.S. for evaluation.

24 May

South Vietnamese Marines conducted Operation Song Than 6-72, with one battalion conducting an amphibious assault on Wunder Beach and two battalions landing in USMC helicopters nearby. The combined force then engaged PAVN forces and then moved south to return to the Mỹ Chánh Line. The operation resulted in 369 PAVN killed and three tanks destroyed.

25 May

A PAVN tank-infantry force hit the 258th Brigade in the western portion of the Marine division's large area of responsibility of the Mỹ Chánh Line. The regimental-size force made a stubborn attempt to break through the line but was repulsed.

25-8 May

Following intensive artillery fire on 25 May the PAVN mounted their final assault of Kontum on the 26th attacking from the north with armor and infantry. Helicopter gunships and airstrikes were used to destroy the tanks and while the battle see-sawed on the 27th and into the 28th the PAVN assault was halted and they were eventually forced to withdraw.

26 May

A reinforced PAVN battalion launched an attack against the 258th Brigade's western flank of the Mỹ Chánh Line. One element of the PAVN force made the 9th Battalion pull back more than 1,000 meters to consolidate. Heavy air strikes and naval gunfire was directed onto the attackers, who finally broke contact, leaving more than 200 dead on the battlefield.

29 May

In the joint communique issued at the end of Nixon's visit to the Soviet Union, the two sides restated their usual positions on the war with the Soviets requiring unilateral U.S. withdrawal and the end of bombing.

31 May

Thiệu visited Kontum and then flew on to Huế where he promoted Marine Division commander Colonel Bui The Lan to Brigadier General.

== June ==
2 June

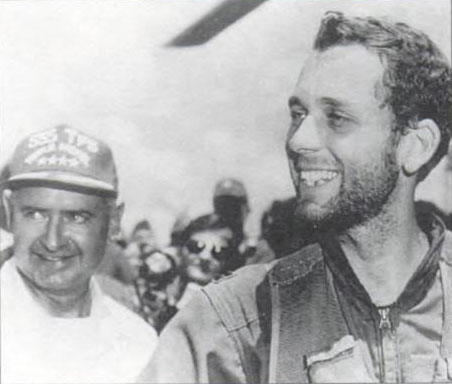
Roger Locher following his rescue

USAF Major Roger Locher, whose F-4D had been shot down on 10 May, was finally rescued after 23 days behind enemy lines. He was 60 miles (97 km) northwest of Hanoi and within 5 miles (8.0 km) of the heavily defended Yên Bái Air Base. His time behind enemy lines and successful rescue was a record for the war and was the farthest penetration of an American search and rescue operation into North Vietnam.

The South Vietnamese Senate voted 27:21 against allowing Thiệu to rule by decree for six months.

3 June

South Vietnam was reported to be in its worst economic recession on record with high urban unemployment attributed to the withdrawal of U.S. forces.

Monsoon rains reduced the fighting across South Vietnam.

3-4 June

The contents of the Peers Report on the Mỹ Lai massacre are made public by Seymour Hersh. The report concluded that the entire command of the 25th Infantry Division intentionally or unintentionally covered up the massacre. Hersh also revealed the massacre of 60-155 civilians at Mỹ Khê 4 on the same day as the Mỹ Lai massacre.

3–12 June

Operation Thunderhead was a secret combat mission conducted by U.S. Navy SEAL Team One and Underwater Demolition Team (UDT)-11 off the coast of North Vietnam to rescue two U.S. airmen said to be escaping from a prisoner of war camp in Hanoi.

4 June

PAVN forces attacked Phù Mỹ in Bình Định province, but were forced back by airstrikes that killed at least 60 PAVN.

U.S. pilots reported that North Vietnam was now firing less than ten SA-2s a day, when dozens were fired daily against the early missions over North Vietnam.

The first presidential election held in the Khmer Republic resulted in a victory for the incumbent, Lon Nol, although counting within the capital Phnom Penh showed a majority for challenger In Tam. Lon Nol ordered the FANK to collect and count the poll results from the countryside, where In Tam had had greater support, and was soon declared the winner.

5 June

An Air America C-46 crashed on approach to Pleiku Air Base killing all 32 on board.

Six civilians were killed in a rocket attack on Phnom Penh.

Testifying before the Senate and House Appropriations Committees, Laird said that increased U.S. air and naval activities would add $3–5 billion to the defense budget for the year.

6 June

The JGS reported that almost all PAVN had been ejected from Kontum and that more than 200 had been killed in six separate clashes the previous day, however PAVN forces remained in strength around the city.

7 June

The advanced element of the ARVN relief column finally reached the southern defensive line at An Lộc after almost two months of fighting along Route 13.

B-52s attacked PAVN positions north of the DMZ in the first B-52 raids over North Vietnam in seven weeks.

RVNAF A-37s accidentally bombed an ARVN Airborne position 7 miles (11 km) southwest of Mỹ Chánh, killing nine and wounding 21.

8 June

South Vietnamese Marines launched Operation Song Than 8-72, a four-battalion attack across the Mỹ Chánh River. The Marines moved forward under the cover of a closely coordinated fire support plan which included B-52 strikes, tactical air, artillery and naval gunfire. The PAVN took heavy losses, with the operation accounting for 230 PAVN killed, seven tanks destroyed and 102 weapons, including several SA-7 missiles captured or destroyed, while nine Marinese were killed. At the conclusion of the operation the Marines held positions north of the Mỹ Chánh River.

A further eight B-52 strikes were conducted against PAVN positions north of the DMZ, the B-52s were used due to the diminished SAM threat with no SAMs were fired at any U.S. aircraft operating across North Vietnam. U.S. jets bombed the Lungtruong rail tunnel 10 miles (16 km) west of Lạng Sơn collapsing the southern end of the tunnel.

ARVN 1st Division forces were landed by helicopter on hills near Firebase Veghel which had been abandoned to the PAVN in April.

At least 30 122mm rockets hit Phnom Penh, killing 23 people and wounding 30 others.

A South Vietnamese village outside of Trảng Bàng District was bombed with napalm in an errant air strike by the RVNAF. A photograph of the incident was published on the front pages of newspapers that evening and the next morning showed children crying in pain from their burns, including a 9-year-old girl, Phan Thị Kim Phúc, who had torn her clothes off after catching fire. The image would win a Pulitzer Prize.

9 June

John Paul Vann, the senior U.S. adviser in II Corps, died when his helicopter was shot down 10 miles (16 km) north of Pleiku. During his years in South Vietnam Vann had acquired much influence and fame and his funeral in Washington was attended by a who's who of U.S. civilian and military leaders.

While some ARVN relief forces had reached An Lộc the majority of the relief column remained bogged down on Route 13 and while helicopter resupply was possible, fixed-wing resupply was impossible due to heavy PAVN artillery fire.

The PAVN fired rockets on Phnom Penh and Ta Khmau 7 miles (11 km) to the south and then launched an assault on Ta Khmau. Thirty people (including 15 children) were killed and 40 injured.

The U.S. had more than doubled the number of fight-bombers, tripled the number of carriers and quadrupled the number of B-52s in Southeast Asia in expanding the air war far beyond its previous peak in 1968.

10 June

U.S. jets used laser-guided bombs to destroy the Lang Chi hydroelectric power plant, one of the largest power plants in North Vietnam.

The New York Times reported that Lavelle had been relieved for unauthorised bombing of North Vietnam reported as "protective reaction" strikes.

11 June

Ambassador Bunker reported to Washington that South Vietnamese civilian casualties in the offensive were far higher than during the 1968 Tet Offensive, with more than 25,000 civilians killed and over 1.2 million new refugees.

12 June

Lavelle testified before the House Armed Services committee that he was relieved in March for ordering air strikes on North Vietnam, but that he had kept his superiors fully informed of his activities.

Beijing described the U.S. air raids close to the North Vietnam-China border as a threat to Chinese security and a "grave provocation to the Chinese people."

Joint United States Public Affairs Office closed its Saigon headquarters ahead of its disestablishment at the end of June with its role being taken over by South Vietnamese organizations and the United States Information Service.

13 June

A regiment of the ARVN 18th Division was landed by helicopters in An Lộc as civilian refugees fled the wreckage of the town, however Route 13 still remained blocked by the PAVN who fired on the refugees. An RVNAF CH-47 carrying refugees from An Lộc crashed killing all 47 onboard.

U.S. aircraft flew a record 340 airstrikes over North Vietnam, destroying or damaging ten bridges including four on the northwest rail line from Hanoi to China.

The U.S. reassured China that bombing raids close to their border with North Vietnam was not intended to threaten their security. Meanwhile U.S. jets used laser-guided bombs to destroy two rail bridges within 25 miles (40 km) of the border the previous day.

14 June

More ARVN troops were landed by helicopter in An Lộc as the PAVN apparently withdrew its forces under the cover of artillery fire.

MACV reported that the rail line between Hanoi and Haiphong had been cut by the bombing of the rail and highway bridge at Hải Dương. Other airstrikes destroyed a factory in northwest Hanoi that was the only facility producing pontoon bridges.

U.S. aircraft began an informal four day bombing halt of the Hanoi area while Soviet head of state Nikolai Podgorny visited Hanoi. USAF officers were reported to be unhappy with the pause as it would allow the North Vietnamese to reinforce their air defenses.

15 June

U.S. aircraft matched their previous record of 340 airstrikes over North Vietnam. The attacks included fighter-bomber raids on the VPAF's Kép, Quang Lang and Bai Thuong air bases and B-52 raids on Đồng Hới.

Cathay Pacific Flight 700Z, operated by a Convair 880 (VR-HFZ) from Bangkok to Hong Kong, disintegrated and crashed while the aircraft was flying at 29,000 feet (8,800 m) over Pleiku after a bomb exploded in a suitcase placed under a seat in the cabin, killing all 81 people on board.

15 June - 19 October

Operation Black Lion was an RLA counter-offensive against a PAVN offensive at Khong Sedone. The RLA succeeded in capturing Salavan, but failed to capture Paksan.

16 June

MACV announced that the 196th Infantry Brigade was being disbanded and that its responsibility for the defense of Danang would be assumed by the reforming ARVN 3rd Division.

17 June

Burglars broke into the Democratic National Committee's headquarters at the Watergate complex in Washington D.C., starting what would become the Watergate scandal.

18 June

U.S. aircraft conducted another 320 airstrikes on North Vietnam, including further strikes on Kép, Quang Lang and Bai Thuong air bases.

In fighting near Firebase 41 halfway between Kontum and Pleiku the ARVN reported destroying eight tanks and killing more than 100 PAVN.

The ARVN III Corps commander, Lieutenant General Nguyễn Văn Minh, declared the Battle of An Lộc over and Thiệu briefly visited the town.

A USAF AC-130A gunship operated by the 16th Special Operations Squadron was shot down by an SA-7 over the A Sầu Valley, killing all twelve onboard.

MACV announced the 3rd Brigade, 1st Cavalry Division had begun to stand down.

In order to reestablish Soviet supply lines to North Vietnam, China agreed that Soviet bloc ships could unload supplies at Chinese ports which would then be moved by rail into North Vietnam.

18-27 June

South Vietnamese Marines launched Operation Song Than 8A-72 involving all three VNMC brigades. 147th Brigade struck north along Route 555, into the notorious Street Without Joy coastal area. 369th Brigade held the center position as it attacked across open rice paddies, flanked to the west by 258th Brigade, moving along Highway 1. PAVN counterattacks on 20 June were repulsed in heavy fighting with 237 PAVN and 31 Marines killed. By 27 June, the Marines had successfully established a new defensive line 4 km north of the Mỹ Chánh River. The operation had resulted in 761 PAVN killed and eight tanks destroyed.

19 June

In an Armed Forces Day radio address, Thiệu declared that the North Vietnamese offensive had been defeated and pledged to recapture all lost territory within three months.

The New York Times reported that the offensive had severely undermined pacification efforts in South Vietnam's six northernmost provinces.

Newsweek published the story "Pacification's deadly price" that speculated that up to 5,000 civilians had been killed by U.S. forces during Operation Speedy Express in the Mekong Delta between December 1968 and May 1969.

U.S. military advisers criticized the move of three USAF fighter-bomber squadrons from Danang Air Base to Takhli Royal Thai Air Force Base complaining that the added distance would require more aerial refueling and reduce time on station. The Nixon administration said the move was necessitated by the withdrawal of the 196th Infantry Brigade.

20 June

Responding to a U.S. request for a resumption of secret negotiations, North Vietnam. responded that "clothed by its goodwill, [it] agrees to private meetings." The meetings between Kissinger and Le Duc Tho would begin on 19 July.

Nixon named Abrams as the next Chief of Staff of the United States Army to replace Westmoreland on 3 July.

The 3rd Brigade, 1st Cavalry Division commanded by Brigadier General James F. Hamlet was stood down at Bien Hoa Air Base in a ceremony attended by Abrams and Lieutenant General Nguyễn Văn Minh.

21 June - 21 September 1973

United States Marine Corps aircraft begin operating from Royal Thai Air Base Nam Phong hitting targets in Vietnam, Cambodia and Laos.

22 June

ARVN 25th Division troops replaced 21st Division troops on Route 13 south of An Lộc and more troops from the 18th Division were flown into the town.

A PAVN attack on ARVN Airborne positions 4 miles (6.4 km) southwest of Mỹ Chánh was repulsed by the ARVN supported by B-52 strikes. Sixteen tanks were destroyed and 146 PAVN killed for the loss of one ARVN.

23 June

The New York Times reported that nearly all helicopter missions into An Lộc were being flown by U.S. helicopters because the RVNAF were too afraid to fly there and ARVN commanders had requested U.S. helicopters.

Another PAVN attack west of Huế was repulsed with 13 tanks destroyed and 98 PAVN killed for the loss of five ARVN killed.

24 June

Another PAVN attack on the Mỹ Chánh Line was repulsed with 22 tanks knocked out and more than 100 PAVN killed by the South Vietnamese Marines.

U.S. fighter-bombers attacked the Thái Nguyên steel plant with laser-guided bombs, halting production at North Vietnam's only modern steel plant.

25 June

ARVN forces fought approximately 120 PAVN near Firebase King (16.4°N 107.453°E), west of Huế, killing 63. U.S. fighter-bombers destroyed two tanks in Quảng Trị province.

U.S. fighter-bombers attacked the Việt Trì power plant with laser-guided bombs rendering it inoperational.

26 June

The U.S. was reported to have established a 25 miles (40 km) wide buffer zone along the North Vietnam-China border that was off-limits to U.S. bombers.

North Vietnam was reported to have almost completed a 4 inches (100 mm) fuel pipeline from Hanoi to Lạng Sơn on the Chinese border.

U.S. aircraft bombed Bach Mai Airfield near central Hanoi and other targets close to the center of Haiphong. North Vietnam claimed that Bạch Mai Hospital, adjacent to the airfield had been bombed causing civilian casualties.

27 June

The South Vietnamese Senate passed a bill authorizing Thieu to rule by decree for six months. The vote was passed after the curfew when opposition members were absent.

PAVN forces fired more than 1,000 mortar rounds on ARVN positions 2 miles (3.2 km) southeast of Firebase Bastogne. The PAVN attack was repulsed for the loss of 60 PAVN and nine ARVN.

28 June

Nixon announced that draftees would no longer be sent to South Vietnam unless they volunteered to go.

163 U.S. aircraft dropped more than 4,000 tons of bombs on PAVN positions north and southwest of Huế between the 26th and 28th while a PAVN attack 2.5 miles (4.0 km) southwest of Mỹ Chánh was repulsed with four tanks destroyed.

28 June – 16 September

The Second Battle of Quảng Trị (Vietnamese: Thành cổ Quảng Trị) began on 28 June and lasted 81 days until 16 September, when South Vietnamese forces recaptured most of the province.

Leading U.S. officials in Saigon expressed optimism that South Vietnam could now withstand any further North Vietnamese offensive action, however they believed that South Vietnam would require at least three more years of training and equipping before they could withstand another North Vietnamese offensive without the U.S. air support that had stalemated the current offensive. North Vietnamese objectives in the offensive remained unclear, other than inflicting severe losses on the South Vietnamese military, which they had succeeded in doing with the ARVN 1st, 3rd, 5th, 21st and 22nd Divisions all suffering heavy losses and the strategic reserves of Airborne, Marines and Rangers overstretched and depleted.

29 June

The 196th Infantry Brigade departed South Vietnam becoming the last U.S. combat brigade to leave.

Nixon agreed to the resumption of the Paris Peace Talks.

30 June

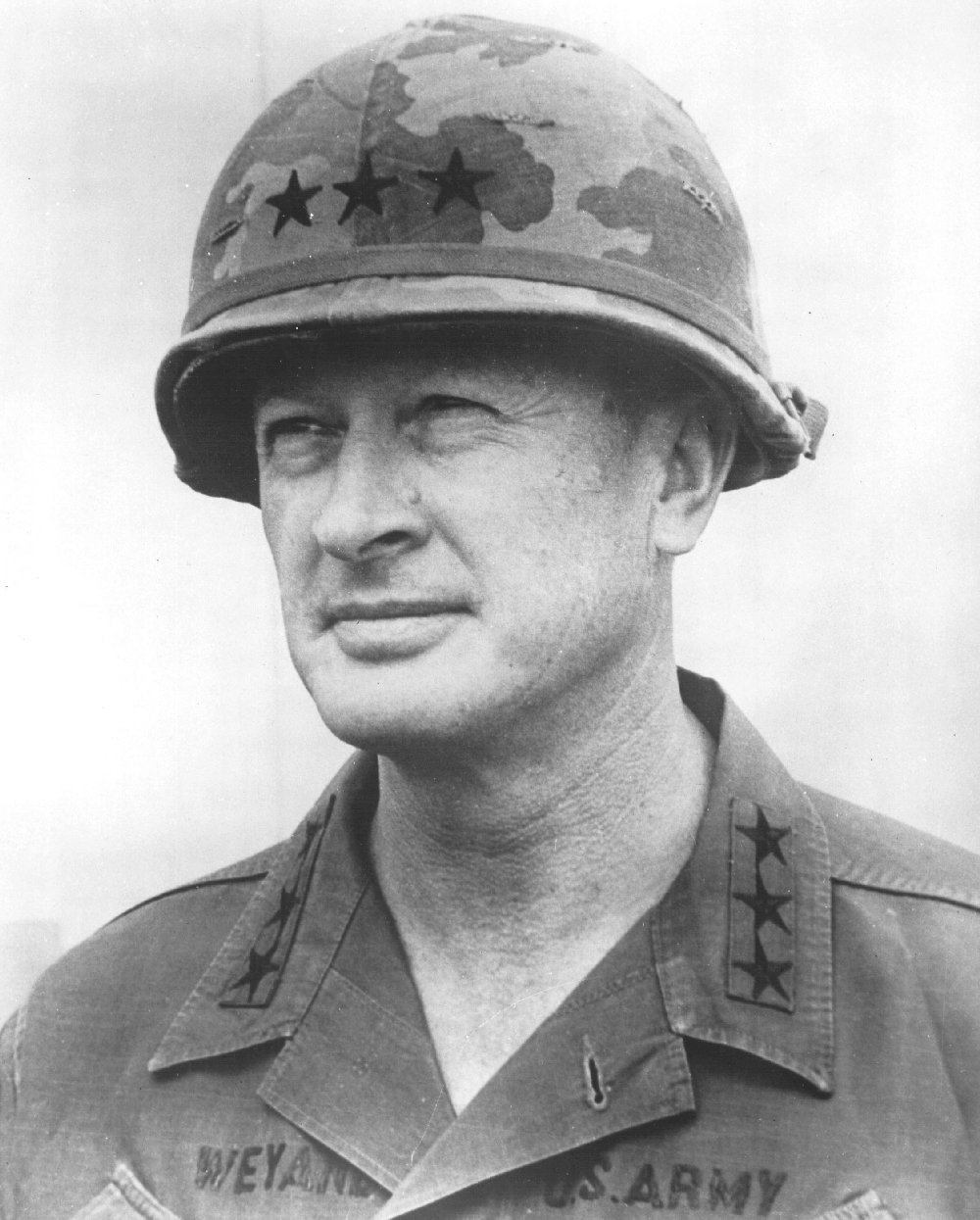
General Frederick Weyand

General Frederick C. Weyand assumed command of MACV from Abrams.

XXIV Corps was inactivated and its assets formed the basis for its successor, the First Regional Assistance Command (FRAC).

== July ==
2 July

The PAVN shelled An Lộc and then launched an attack on the town that was repulsed for the loss of 86 PAVN and 16 ARVN killed.

PAVN artillery shelled Huế killing ten civilians and wounding at least 38. 750 shells hit Firebase Bastogne.

An antiwar South Vietnamese student, Nguyễn Thái Bình, attempted to hijack Pan Am Flight 841 as it flew from Manila to Saigon, demanding that the flight be diverted to Hanoi. The Boeing 747 landed at Tan Son Nhut and after scuffling with the pilot Bình was shot dead by a passenger, a former police officer who had been alerted by the pilot and retrieved a stowed handgun.

U.S. military sources acknowledged that they had been using Cloud seeding in Indochina since 1963 to disrupt PAVN/VC logistics.

3 July

PAVN 130mm guns targeted the Huế Citadel, 14 rockets hit Phu Bai Combat Base and 500 artillery shells hit an ARVN position 5 miles (8.0 km) south of Mỹ Chánh.

The RMK-BRJ construction consortium formally ended its construction program in South Vietnam in a ceremony attended by Ambassador Bunker.

4 July

ARVN Airborne and South Vietnamese Marines were reported to have entered Quảng Trị recapturing about one third of the city. A U.S. fighter-bomber accidentally bombed an ARVN position 5 miles (8.0 km) southeast of the city killing 10 ARVN and wounding 30.

Five PAVN rockets hit Huế killing three civilians and wounding seven. Two South Vietnamese outposts 11 miles (18 km) southwest of Huế were hit by 800 and 200 artillery shells respectively, killing seven ARVN. The PAVN assaulted ARVN positions on the approaches to Huế losing 49 killed.

In clashes in the Parrot's Beak 123 PAVN and 18 ARVN were killed.

6 July

PAVN artillery fired 130 rounds into Huế causing minimal damage. The PAVN assaulted Firebase Checkmate west of Huế capturing the base while losing more than 120 PAVN killed.

The total number of PAVN killed in clashes in the Parrot's Beak was reported to exceed 500.

7 July

South Vietnamese sources corrected earlier reports that their forces had entered Quảng Trị City, with the forces engaged in heavy fighting at La Vang 2 miles (3.2 km) from the city center. Airborne troops repulsed a PAVN armored attack destroying three tanks while B-52s and fighter-bombers attack PAVN positions in and around the city.

8 July

USAF F-4Es shot down three VPAF MiG-21s.

9 July

Brigadier General Richard J. Tallman died of wounds from PAVN artillery fire in the Battle of An Lộc. He was the last U.S. general officer to be killed in action during the war.

Two U.S. soldiers were killed when U.S. artillery accidentally fired on their patrol near Danang. U.S. jets accidentally bombed an ARVN position near Kontum killing six ARVN.

10 July

ARVN Airborne forces repelled a PAVN armored assault 9 miles (14 km) east-northeast of Quảng Trị destroying six tanks while U.S. fighter-bombers destroyed three 130mm guns near Quảng Trị.

PAVN artillery fired more than 100 rounds on ARVN positions 1 mile (1.6 km) east of Firebase Checkmate.

11 July

A USMC CH-53D was hit by an SA-7 and crashed near Quảng Trị, killing 3 crewmen and 45 South Vietnamese Marines.

In seven PAVN attacks near Quảng Trị the PAVN were reported to have lost eight tanks and 149 soldiers for the loss of 14 ARVN killed.

12 July

PAVN armored forces attacked Airborne and Marine units around Quảng Trị reportedly losing 20 tanks and 155 killed for the loss of 21 South Vietnamese killed.

Correspondent Alexander D. Shimkin was killed in a PAVN ambush in Quảng Trị Province. He had earlier raised concerns about potential indiscriminate fire during Operation Speedy Express.

Malcolm Browne writing in The New York Times reported on the growing hostility amongst the South Vietnamese military towards foreign journalists and claimed that he and other journalists had been deliberately misdirected into unsecure areas by South Vietnamese soldiers.

The Pentagon disputed a report by journalist Jean Thoraval of Agence France-Presse that U.S. aircraft had deliberately bombed dikes in North Vietnam.

13 July

The Paris Peace Talks resumed.

14 July

In fighting 4 miles (6.4 km) northeast of Quảng Trị 115 PAVN and three South Vietnamese Marines were reported killed.

PAVN artillery fired more than 1,300 artillery rounds on ARVN positions near Firebase Checkmate and then assaulted the position killing six ARVN.

Six leaders of Vietnam Veterans Against the War were indicted on Federal charges of conspiracy to provoked an armed rebellion at the 1972 Republican National Convention.

15 July

Actress Jane Fonda posed for photographs at a North Vietnamese anti-aircraft gun near Hanoi. Pictures of the actress ran worldwide the next day and earned her the nickname "Hanoi Jane".

ARVN airborne forces reported finding more than 250 PAVN killed in 60 bunkers destroyed by B-52 strikes 8 miles (13 km) south of Quảng Trị, while Marines found six graves containing more than 48 PAVN dead in an area hit by B-52 strikes 2 miles (3.2 km) northeast of Quảng Trị.

PAVN forces again bombarded and then assaulted ARVN positions near Firebase Checkmate and also Firebase Bastogne resulting in 40 PAVN and eight ARVN killed.

16 July

Airborne forces killed 46 PAVN and destroyed one tank in clashes southeast of Quảng Trị while more than 125 B-52 sorties were flown north and south of the DMZ to interdict resupply of PAVN forces fighting in Quảng Trị Province.

17 July

North Vietnam ordered the mobilization of all able-bodied civilians for a period of six months to two years, with a penalty of two years hard labor for anyone refusing to comply.

The U.S. destroyer USS Warrington was damaged beyond repair by two underwater explosions while operating in the Gulf of Tonkin. The blasts were believed to have been caused by American naval mines that had washed away after having been laid in North Vietnam's ports. The Warrington was towed to Subic Bay Naval Base and decommissioned.

18 July

PAVN artillery fire on Huế killed ten civilians and wounded three.

19 July

In fighting around Quảng Trị South Vietnam reported killing 295 PAVN and capturing two tanks, while near Mỹ Chánh 27 PAVN were killed and one U.S. LOH and one AH-1 were shot down.

The ARVN 22nd Division and Ranger units began a counteroffensive in Bình Định province.

The U.S. and North Vietnam confirmed that secret talks between Kissinger and Le Duc Tho had resumed in Paris.

21 July

ARVN forces recaptured the district capital of Hoài Nhơn in Bình Định province.

USMC AH-1s operating from USS Denver attacked North Vietnamese barges 30 miles (48 km) north-northwest of Đồng Hới.

The New York Times reported that the U.S. had unsuccessfully attempted to create forest fires in South Vietnam in 1966-7 under the codename Operation Pink Rose.

22 July

The PAVN cut Highway 1 3 miles (4.8 km) north of Phong Điền in an attempt to stop resupply of South Vietnamese forces engaged at Quảng Trị.

In the first U.S. air attacks on Hanoi in a month, U.S. jets used laser-guided bombs to destroy warehouses 2 miles (3.2 km) southeast of the city center.

23 July

ARVN Rangers supported by armored cars killed 47 PAVN in Kampong Trabek, Cambodia.

The PAVN attacked Firebase Lion 25 miles (40 km) south of Danang killing or wounding 20 ARVN, the base was abandoned the next day.

24 July

ARVN forces recaptured Tam Quan in Bình Định province.

More than 700 PAVN artillery shells hit ARVN positions near Firebase Bastogne.

The U.S. Senate passed the Cooper Amendment to a military aid bill, the amendment called on U.S. forces to withdraw from South Vietnam within four months of the release of all U.S. POWs, but the bill was defeated 48:42.

Secretary-General of the United Nations Kurt Waldheim accused the U.S. of deliberately bombing dikes in North Vietnam, the charges were denied by the Nixon Administration.

25 July

South Vietnam claimed that its forces had recaptured the Quảng Trị Citadel and controlled the entire city, but reports indicated that PAVN forces continued to hold out there.

A PAVN rocket and artillery attack on Quế Sơn killed five civilians and wounded four soldiers and 15 civilians.

26 July

The Nixon Administration said that damage to North Vietnamese dikes was minor and incidental to attacks on legitimate military targets.

27 July

The ARVN again abandoned Firebase Bastogne in the face of heavy PAVN shelling and ground attacks.

28 July

In Quảng Trị ARVN Airborne forces were replaced by South Vietnamese Marines however the Quảng Trị Citadel was abandoned to the PAVN in the face of continued resistance.

The Nixon Administration released an intelligence report stating that damage to North Vietnamese dikes was minor and accidental.

29 July

U.S. Navy jets accidentally bombed ARVN positions near Firebase Bastogne killing eight ARVN and wounding 25. A PAVN artillery and ground attack on the position resulted in 25 PAVN and one ARVN killed.

ARVN forces abandoned Tam Quan after evacuating the civilians there and PAVN forces seized half of Bồng Sơn.

USAF jets shot down two VPAF MiG-21s.

30 July

A B-52 crashed north of Ubon, Thailand while en route to a bombing mission, only one crewman survived.

31 July

A PAVN rocket attack on Bien Hoa Air Base killed one American.

U.S. Navy jets attacked a shipyard in Haiphong that built and repaired shallow-draft boats that were being used to evade U.S. naval mines.

== August ==
1 August

More than 2,000 ARVN began an operation near Kampong Trabek in the Parrot's Beak region of Cambodia to reduce PAVN infiltration into the Mekong Delta.

2 August

PAVN artillery fired more than 2,000 shells against South Vietnamese Marines near Quảng Trị killing eight Marines.

ARVN forces preceded by B-52 strikes recaptured Firebase Bastogne, meeting no resistance. In fighting east and north of Bastogne 56 PAVN were reported killed.

ARVN forces patrolling near Cái Bè found the graves of more than 130 PAVN/VC killed in B-52 strikes.

3 August

A rocket attack on Danang Air Base killed one American.

Allied intelligence sources in Saigon said that the PAVN/VC had executed 250-500 South Vietnamese government officials and imprisoned more than 6,000 during their occupation of Bình Định province.

4 August

In Quảng Trị the South Vietnamese admitted that the Marines were stalled, but reported killing more than 100 PAVN in the preceding two days, while U.S. jets destroyed six PAVN tanks.

In fighting in the Plain of Reeds 77 PAVN were killed by ARVN forces while the graves of 25 PAVN killed in B-52 strikes were found.

The U.S. reported that a second fuel pipeline from China to Kép was nearing completion and would be capable of pumping 600 tons of fuel per day.

Thieu passed a decree law restricting newspaper and magazine publishing.

5 August

Units of the ARVN 7th Division engaged PAVN/VC 8 miles (13 km) north of Cai Lậy district killing 79 for the loss of five ARVN killed. ARVN forces recaptured Nhị Bình east of Cai Lậy with 20 ARVN and 16 VC killed.

ARVN forces recaptured Firebase Checkmate.

5–10 August

Task Force Gimlet, Delta Company, 3rd Battalion, 21st Infantry undertook the last patrol by U.S. troops in the war to seek out PAVN/VC forces firing rockets at Danang. Two U.S. soldiers were wounded by booby traps. The unit was relieved by ARVN soldiers.

6 August

U.S. Navy jets attacked a vehicle depot 2 miles (3.2 km) south of central Hanoi with laser-guided bombs.

PAVN/VC sappers attacked Cam Ranh Base killing one ARVN and losing one killed.

PAVN forces captured five hamlets 10 miles (16 km) southeast of Huế.

Khmer Air Force planes destroyed six PAVN tanks and damaged four more near Kampong Trabek.

6 August - 25 October

Operation Phou Phiang II was an RLA operation to relieve the PAVN siege of Long Tieng. Five columns of RLA/Thai forces attacked PAVN forces but all were defeated despite intensive U.S. air support.

7 August

USAF and USMC jets destroyed 14 PAVN T-54 tanks near Kampong Trabek.

PAVN forces attacked three ARVN outposts in Quảng Ngãi province resulting in 86 PAVN and four ARVN killed.

ARVN forces ejected the PAVN from hamlets southeast of Huế and fought off two attacks on Firebase Checkmate.

8 August

PAVN/VC units attacked ARVN Regional Forces in Long Thành 17 miles (27 km) east of Saigon killing almost 100 ARVN.

U.S. jets, ARVN and FANK forces continued to fight against PAVN tank-infantry units near Kampong Trabek, while other armored units were seen near Prey Vieng and Svay Rieng.

ARVN forces fought off PAVN assaults on Firebases Bastogne and Checkmate killing 21 PAVN.

8-22 August

The ARVN 18th Division recaptured Quản Lợi Base Camp from the PAVN, using TOW missiles and M-202 rockets to destroy the base's concrete bunkers.

9 August

The PAVN hit South Vietnamese Marines 1 mile (1.6 km) southeast of Quảng Trị with more than 320 rockets and 130 artillery shells. Sixty-one PAVN and five Marines were killed in Quảng Trị.

The PAVN attacked a militia post near Than Han in Pleiku Province resulting in 46 PAVN and one ARVN killed. PAVN forces attacked a militia outpost 20 miles (32 km) southwest of Pleiku killing 15 ARVN.

A PAVN artillery attack on Huế killed three civilians and wounded 11.

10 August

RVNAF aircraft destroyed 14 tanks and six trucks and killed 15 PAVN 6 miles (9.7 km) southeast of Quảng Trị, while U.S. jets destroyed four tanks near the city.

PAVN/VC sappers attacked Lai Khê losing 16 killed and four captured for the loss of two ARVN killed.

PAVN/VC sappers attacked Cam Ranh Base killing four policeman for the loss of one sapper killed.

The Nixon Administration said that increased bombing in Vietnam would cost about $1.1 billion in the current fiscal year, less than previous estimates.

11 August

The last two U.S. ground combat units, the 3rd Battalion, 21st Infantry Regiment and Battery G, 29th Field Artillery Regiment stood down at Danang.

100 PAVN/VC sappers attacked Lai Khê losing 38 killed, while ARVN losses were four killed.

The PAVN/VC attacked Tam Quan resulting in ten PAVN and five ARVN killed.

12 August

W. Averell Harriman and Cyrus Vance, the two original U.S. negotiators at the Paris Peace Talks, said in a press conference that President Nixon had missed an opportunity in 1969 to end the Vietnam War, at a time when the North Vietnamese had withdrawn most of its combat troops from South Vietnam's northernmost provinces.

C-130E Hercules #62-1853 of the 776th Tactical Airlift Squadron was shot down on takeoff from Sóc Trăng Airfield, killing 30 of 44 passengers and crew on board.

The New York Times reported on accusations of widespread torture of civilians who had been imprisoned in South Vietnamese jails since the start of the Easter Offensive.

13 August

Former U.S. Attorney General Ramsey Clark returned from North Vietnam, where he had traveled as a private individual as part of a factfinding group. Clark said that he had confirmed that the United States was bombing hospitals and dikes, and that he had been told that American prisoners "will be released immediately when we stop this senseless, murderous bombing and end the war and get out, get home, and get to the business of building the peace and giving happiness to little children around the world".

14 August

Senior South Vietnamese military officials said that whatever the outcome of the Paris Peace Talks the North Vietnamese would never settle for anything other than outright victory but that as long as U.S. military support continued South Vietnam could continue the war indefinitely.

15 August

U.S. jets hit the recently repaired Việt Trì power plant again putting it out of operation.

16 August

PAVN artillery fired more than 474 shells into South Vietnamese positions around Quảng Trị and 1,325 shells into positions around Hải Lăng. The shelling and ground combat resulted in 93 PAVN and 19 South Vietnamese killed.

ARVN troops near Cai Lậy killed 18 PAVN and captured 14 SA-7 and six AT-3 missiles.

U.S. aircraft flew 370 sorties over North Vietnam, the highest number of the year, due to improved weather.

17 August

In fighting in Quảng Trị 98 PAVN, 19 South Vietnamese and one U.S. adviser were reported killed.

ARVN Airborne forces killed 68 PAVN in the foothills 9 miles (14 km) south of Quảng Trị.

A PAVN attack on Hiếu Đức 10 miles (16 km) southwest of Danang resulted in eight ARVN and seven PAVN killed.

Kissinger met twice with Thiệu in Saigon.

An editorial in Nhân Dân implicitly criticized China and the USSR for their improving relations with the U.S. and rejected any compromise of the North's negotiating position.

18 August

Following an artillery barrage the PAVN 711th Division attacked and captured Quế Sơn and Firebase Ross, including 15-20 of the then secret TOW missiles among the abandoned equipment.

The PAVN fired 43 rockets at Danang Air Base, hitting the base and adjacent housing and killing 27 South Vietnamese civilians and one U.S. airman, wounding 24 civilians and 21 U.S. airmen and destroying two aircraft with ten damaged.

South Vietnamese jets and artillery destroyed five PAVN tanks 5 miles (8.0 km) southwest of Quảng Trị.

19 August

PAVN/VC forces cut Highway 1 at Trảng Bom, Highway 4 in the Mekong Delta and Highway 13 near Lai Khê.

Two RVNAF helicopters carrying refugees collided near Kontum killing 38 people and injuring 42.

Democratic Presidential nominee McGovern said that he expected Thiệu and his "cohorts" to flee into exile and for a communist dominated coalition to take power in Saigon if he won the 1972 Presidential election.

20 August

Forty South Vietnamese civilians were killed and 30 wounded when their bus hit a mine on the highway from Pleiku to Phu Nhon.

22 August

In fighting around Quảng Trị 79 PAVN and eight South Vietnamese were killed.

In fighting around Tam Quan and Hoai Nhon 23 PAVN and two ARVN were killed.

PAVN/VC ambushed a Ranger force 36 miles (58 km) north of Saigon killing 30 Rangers with 40 missing.

Thiệu overturned a 1968 election law and abolished elections in South Vietnam's 10,775 hamlets claiming that many hamlet chiefs were communists and supported the VC. He ordered the 44 province chiefs appointed by him to appoint hamlet officials.

At the Republican National Convention, Nixon was endorsed as the Republican candidate for the 1972 Presidential Election.

23 August

ARVN forces attempting to recapture Quế Sơn claimed to have killed 108 PAVN for the loss of one killed in fighting 3 miles (4.8 km) from the town.

ARVN forces were reported to have killed 56 PAVN for the loss of seven ARVN after two PAVN battalions attacked Duy Xuyên district south of Danang.

RVNAF A-37s destroyed nine tanks and five trucks southwest of Quảng Trị.

Twenty-one South Vietnamese civilians were killed when their bus hit a mine in the Central Highlands.

24 August

In fighting around Quảng Trị 207 PAVN and 15 South Vietnamese were reported killed.

In continued fighting near Duy Xuyên 64 PAVN and eight ARVN were reported killed.

The ARVN arrested the 5th Regiment, 2nd Division commander Colonel Nguyen Van Lu and a battalion commander for their role in losing Firebase Ross and it was reported that as many as 2,500 ARVN troops remained unaccounted for.

25 August

A 10,000 man ARVN task force comprising Rangers supported by tanks recaptured part of Quế Sơn.

Rangers fighting PAVN/VC at the scene of the 22 August ambush reported killing 35 PAVN/VC.

ARVN 2nd Division commander, Brigadier General Phan Hoa Hiep was relieved of command for the loss of Firebase Ross, which was described as the worst South Vietnamese defeat since the height of the Easter Offensive with the division rendered temporarily combat ineffective. Hiep was replaced by Colonel Tran Van Nhut the province chief of Bình Long province.

China claimed that U.S. jets sank a lifeboat from a Chinese merchant ship off the coast of Vinh, killing five Chinese sailors. The U.S. said that it sank a boat being used to ferry supplies ashore that sought to avoid U.S. naval mines.

26 August

In fighting in Quảng Trị Province more than 181 PAVN and 20 South Vietnamese were reported killed.

FANK reported that 117 soldiers were killed and 216 missing after eight days of fighting along Route 5 north of Phnom Penh.

U.S. jets bombed shipyards in Haiphong and Cat Bi and Kien An Air Bases near the city.

U.S. sources said that the casualty rate among South Vietnamese civilians had more than double since the start of the Easter Offensive with more than 24,788 casualties between 30 March and 31 July.

27 August

In fighting in Quảng Trị Province 76 PAVN and four South Vietnamese were reported killed and two PAVN tanks destroyed.

PAVN forces attacked Quế Sơn recapturing part of the town. ARVN 4th Regiment forces got to within 0.5 miles (0.80 km) of Firebase Ross killing 46 PAVN in the advance.

Four U.S. Navy ships, the cruisers USS Newport News and USS Providence and destroyers USS Robison and USS Rowan made a night raid into Haiphong Harbor shelling the port area from a distance of 2 miles (3.2 km). After leaving the harbor two Vietnam People's Navy torpedo boats engaged the ships 27 miles (43 km) southeast of Haiphong with one sunk by the Newport News and the other set on fire by the Rowan and then sunk by a Navy A-7 jet.

28 August

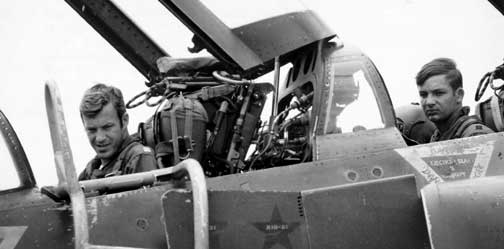
Captains Steve Ritchie (left) and Charles DeBellevue (right) prepare for a mission in their F-4 Phantom

USAF Captain R. Stephen Ritchie became the first USAF ace of the war after downing his fifth VPAF MiG-21 in combat.

U.S. jets attacked PAVN barracks at Xom Bai 37 miles (60 km) northwest of Hanoi, Xuân Mai 17 miles (27 km) southwest of Hanoi and Hải Dương 23 miles (37 km) northwest of Haiphong destroying more than 180 buildings.

Heavy fighting continued in Quế Sơn with the district headquarters repeatedly changing hands.

U.S. helicopter gunships attacked a PAVN rocket unit 6 miles (9.7 km) from Danang killing three PAVN and triggering nine explosions.

29 August

Nixon announced that 12,000 more U.S. soldiers would be withdrawn from South Vietnam over a three-month period, with only 27,000 remaining by 1 December.

30 August

PAVN artillery fired more than 2,000 shells into Marine positions around Quảng Trị killing six Marines. Meanwhile in the Hải Lăng district ARVN Airborne forces killed 20 PAVN.

The PAVN fired more than 50 rockets into Bien Hoa Air Base, destroying one U.S. A-37 and damaging eight other aircraft and killing 14 RVNAF personnel.

U.S. jets destroyed an ammunition dump and fuel depot near Vinh.

The New York Times reported that the Easter Offensive had reached a stalemate with the war set to continue indefinitely.

31 August

In fighting in Quảng Trị 63 PAVN and 12 South Vietnamese were reported killed.

ARVN forces destroyed two PAVN tanks in the Quế Sơn valley.

PAVN sappers killed 28 people and wounded 35 in attacks on a fuel depot in Prek Pnov district and two bridges on Route 5 15 miles (24 km) north of Phnom Penh.

Bunker said to Nixon that the South Vietnamese "fear they are not yet well enough organized to compete politically with such a tough, disciplined organization", i.e. North Vietnam.

== September ==
1 September

An ARVN armored task force attempting to recapture Firebase Ross was stopped by the PAVN 400 yards (370 m) from the base.

PAVN/VC attacked an ARVN command port near Tam Quan killing 22 ARVN with 21 PAVN/VC reported killed.

An ARVN task force engaged an estimated PAVN regiment north of Lai Khê in a two day battle that resulted in an estimated 180 PAVN killed and 130 ARVN killed or missing.

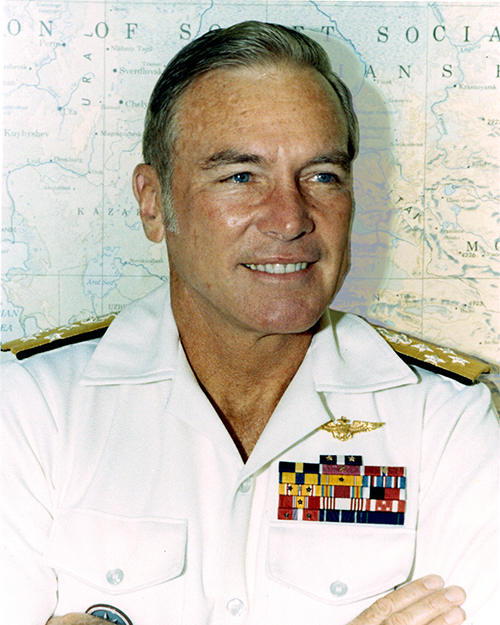
Admiral Noel Gayler

Admiral Noel Gayler became Commander-in-Chief, Pacific Command (CINCPAC) replacing Admiral John S. McCain Jr.

2 September

A PAVN force attacked Plei Djereng Camp but were repulsed for the loss of approximately 100 killed.

USAF jets attacked fuel depots at Kép and Lục Nam district destroying an estimated 160,000 gallons of fuel at Kép.

USAF jets attacked Phúc Yên Air Base with laser-guided bombs cratering the runway and destroying the control tower, operations center, a hangar and other buildings. One MiG-19 was shot down in a dogfight near the base.

Three U.S. Navy ships destroyed supplies on Hòn Lá island which was being used as a transshipment point for sea supplies to North Vietnam.

3 September

PAVN/VC attacked Tiên Phước district in what was described as a major assault.

The ARVN reported killing 53 PAVN in a battle 15 miles (24 km) southwest of Kontum.

The elections for the Khmer Republic's 126-member National Assembly took place. Because of a presidential decree designed to give President Lon Nol's Social Republican Party an advantage, the other parties withdrew from participating. The Socio-Republicans won all 126 seats on what was claimed to be a 78% turnout.

The U.S. Army reprimanded two officers and dismissed a Sergeant from service and closed the Army's actions in relation to the Mỹ Lai massacre.

4 September

The ARVN Border Rangers abandoned Plei Djereng Camp in the face of heavy shelling and ground attacks.

5 September

The PAVN 320th Division attacked Bau Can Camp 12 miles (19 km) southwest of Pleiku but were repulsed with 130 PAVN and five ARVN reported killed. Nine B-52 raids were conducted against suspected PAVN positions in the area.

In fighting in Quảng Trị the Marines reported killing 54 PAVN and capturing four.

The PAVN attacked Firebase Ngotrang 5.5 miles (8.9 km) northwest of Kontum with 19 PAVN and 12 ARVN reported killed.

A PAVN/VC sapper attack on Bearcat Base resulted in five PAVN/VC killed.

6 September

Approximately 300 PAVN attacked a Ranger base southwest of Pleiku resulting in 15 PAVN killed and two captured for the loss of two ARVN killed.

PAVN/VC forces overran Hill 211 overlooking Tiên Phước town and shot down two helicopters bring in ARVN reinforcements.

7 September

PAVN forces were reported to control most of Tiên Phước, giving them control of the western two thirds of Quảng Tín province.

PAVN forces attacked a command post of the ARVN 9th Division in the Mekong Delta killing 22 ARVN for the loss of seven PAVN.

8 September

A PAVN mortar and ground assault at Hoai Nhon resulted in 38 PAVN and eight ARVN killed.

A U.S. adviser said that the assault on Tiên Phước appeared to be aimed to stretch the South Vietnamese forces thinly and that all reserves were fully committed.

In Phnom Penh there were riots over increased rice prices with civilians and soldiers looting numerous food markets and stores.

In a press conference in Saigon, a defector from the PAVN 324th Division stated that his unit had been ordered to fire on anyone, civilian or military, moving south from Quảng Trị in late April and early May as they were all enemies.

9 September

In fighting in Quảng Trị the Marines reported killing 161 PAVN for the loss of ten Marines.

VC sappers attacked a South Vietnamese refugee camp near Danang, killing 20 refugees and wounding 94.

ARVN forces recaptured Firebase Ross killing 27 PAVN for the loss of six ARVN.

In scattered fighting in the Central Highlands and Bình Định province the South Vietnamese reported 153 PAVN and ten ARVN killed.

USAF Captain Charles B. DeBellevue became the last and highest scoring U.S. ace of the war with his fifth and sixth MiG kills.

MACV and the JGS were reported to be in disagreement about the defense of Saigon with U.S. officers dissatisfied with the performance of III Corps commander Lieutenant general Nguyễn Văn Minh.

10 September

In fighting in Quảng Trị the Marines reported killing 280 PAVN.

PAVN/VC sappers attacked Tan Son Nhut and Bien Hoa Air Bases. At Bien Hoa two South Vietnamese were killed and 29 Americans and 20 South Vietnamese wounded and 50 RVNAF aircraft and one USAF AC-119 damaged when a bomb storage area exploded.

The New York Times reported that Chinese and Vietnamese Cambodians lived in fear of new purges after recent food riots and military reversals.

The U.S. Embassy protested recent South Vietnamese television and radio broadcasts which described Democratic Presidential candidate McGovern as a "mad dog" and "enemy of the South Vietnamese people."

11 September

USAF jets again attacked the Long Biên Bridge destroying three spans with laser-guided bombs. U.S. jets also attacked four military barracks around Hanoi.

South Vietnamese Marines reentered Quảng Trị Citadel from the east, losing 24 killed.

RLA forces reported that they had recaptured Khong Sedone.

12 September

The CIA and Defense Intelligence Agency (DIA) reported that North Vietnam was capable of sustaining the war at its current pace for a further two years and that bombing had not significantly reduced infiltration into South Vietnam.

A U.S. adviser said that the pressure on the western flanks of Huế had been substantially reduced due to effective actions by the ARVN 1st Division against the PAVN 324B Division.

USAF jets shot down three VPAF MiG-21s.

13 September

South Vietnamese Marines fighting in Quảng Trị Citadel reported killing 64 PAVN for the loss of five Marines.

14 September

The RVNAF claimed to have attacked a PAVN staging area near Kampong Trabek, killing 80 PAVN and destroying five tanks and 22 trucks.

North Vietnamese negotiators in Paris hinted for the first time that they could accept a peace agreement with the United States that did not require the ouster of Thiệu.

The New York Times reported on the declining standard of medical care in South Vietnam with the departure of the U.S. military with only about 400 doctors available to serve the country's 17 million population.

15 September

South Vietnamese Marines recaptured Quảng Trị City from the PAVN, however most of the province remained under PAVN control. Quảng Trị had been the only provincial capital to fall to the North Vietnamese in the Easter Offensive. South Vietnam claimed that more than 8,135 PAVN had been killed in the fighting.

A PAVN/VC attack on Chơn Thành Camp was repulsed for the loss of 38 PAVN and four ARVN killed.

Fourteen newspapers and 15 other periodicals closed down in South Vietnam as a result of a Presidential decree that all publications pay a $47,000 bond, effectively muting all opposition to the Thiệu government.

16–21 September

The PAVN attacked seven locations in Quảng Ngãi province with the 1st Regiment, 2nd Division attacking Mộ Đức District with mortars and rockets followed by a ground attack. The attack was repulsed with the loss of one U.S. adviser, 70 ARVN and over 600 PAVN killed.

17 September

In the first release of prisoners of war since 1969, North Vietnam released three American prisoners, Navy Lieutenants Norris Charles and Markham Gartley and Air Force Major Edward Elias were provided civilian clothes and then allowed to stay in Hanoi with an American welcoming team.

It was reported that the U.S. was manufacturing ammunition for use in AK-47s used extensively by the FANK.

18 September

Sixty-five FANK troops were killed and more than 216 wounded in fighting on Route 1 40 miles (64 km) southeast of Phnom Penh.

19 September

U.S. commanders acknowledged that the North Vietnamese held substantial, though largely unpopulated, areas of the five northern provinces of South Vietnam and while they had suffered severe losses the offensive had achieved a psychological and physical impact.

20 September

PAVN forces overran part of Ba Tơ camp 15 miles (24 km) southwest of Mộ Đức defended by approximately 400 Rangers.

21 September

The ARVN reported killing 26 PAVN/VC 3 miles (4.8 km) southeast of Tunghia.

ARVN Airborne forces reported killing 63 PAVN in three clashes south of Quảng Trị City.

22 September

ARVN forces abandoned two small outposts near Quảng Ngai in the face of PAVN/VC attacks, while the PAVN laid siege to Ba Tơ camp.

23 September

In a meeting with U.S. antiwar activists in Hanoi, Hoàng Tùng, editor of Nhân Dân said that North Vietnam was preparing for four more years of war if Nixon was reelected.

24 September

A PAVN force supported by tanks attacked ARVN positions east of Tiên Phước while PAVN artillery bombarded ARVN positions near Ba Tơ and Đức Phổ.

FANK reported that 16 of its soldiers had been killed and 39 wounded in heavy fighting at Chambak on Route 2.

25 September

ARVN forces began an operation to reopen Highway 1 in Quảng Ngãi province. An estimated two PAVN divisions supported by tanks and artillery were believed to be operating in the area confronting the ARVN 2nd and 3rd Divisions.

26 September

The PAVN attacked two ARVN positions near Đức Phổ losing 46 killed for the loss of two ARVN. ARVN Rangers reported killing 58 PAVN in fighting near Mộ Đức. Despite these clashes, fighting in South Vietnam was reported to be at its lowest level since the start of the Easter Offensive.

A five ship U.S. Navy task force shelled coastal targets between Vinh and Thanh Hóa.

North Vietnamese negotiators in Paris proposed that a "Provisional Government of National Concord" be formed in South Vietnam to organize elections leading to the union of South and North Vietnam.

27 September

U.S. jets conducted more than 300 strikes over North Vietnam. USAF jets attacked Yên Bái Air Base destroying one MiG-21 on the ground and damaging another. Other raids hit a large logistics complex 84 miles (135 km) northwest of Hanoi, used for transshipment of material from China.

A booby-trap exploded in the car being used by Thomas O. Enders, the deputy U.S. ambassador in Phnom Penh. Enders escaped injury, but two others were killed.

28 September

In fighting near Ba Tơ ARVN Rangers reported killing 35 PAVN for the loss of four killed.

29 September

The USAF announced that the F-111A fighter-bomber had returned to combat over North Vietnam for the first time in more than four years, joining other U.S. jets in more than 300 strikes on North Vietnam. After losing three aircraft due to technical issues on its previous deployment, the F-111A was deployed to provide all-weather strike capability in the coming monsoon season in North Vietnam.

FANK announced that it had abandoned attempts to recapture the Angkor temple complex from the PAVN.

30 September

U.S. jets attacked Phúc Yên, Yên Bái, Vinh and Quang Lang Air Bases destroying five MiGs on the ground and damaging ten others.

FANK airborne forces relieved the besieged town of Samrong Yong, 20 miles (32 km) south of Phnom Penh, approximately 75 FANK troops were killed or wounded in the eight-day siege.

The 8th Special Operations Squadron, the last USAF combat squadron in South Vietnam withdrew from Bien Hoa Air Base.

== October ==
1 October

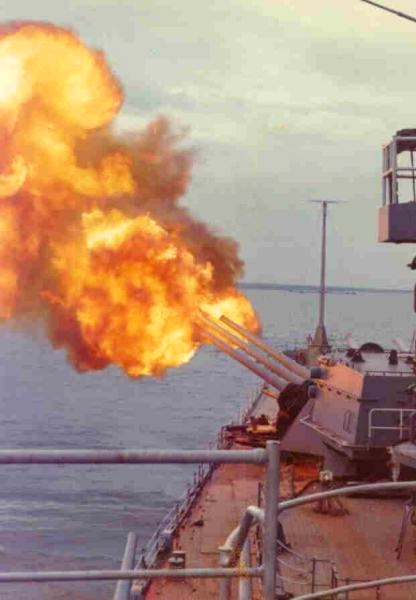
USS Newport News fires on PAVN positions

A gun turret explosion on the USS Newport News operating off the coast of South Vietnam killed 19 sailors and injured ten others.

U.S. jets conducted 320 strikes on North Vietnam including attacks on Kép Air Base and railyards near Hanoi.

A U.S. helicopter gunship accidentally attacked a South Vietnamese position near Mộ Đức wounding five ARVN and 15 civilians.

2 October

The USAF announced that an F-111A had been lost over North Vietnam. North Vietnam claimed to have shot the jet down on 29 September. The type was again withdrawn from combat.

A mortar attack on Kampot Airport killed nine civilians and wounded 20 others.

A mortar attack on Ubon Royal Thai Air Force Base caused no losses.

Haig visited Saigon and met with Thiệu and U.S. officials in what was described as a general review of the Vietnam situation.

3 October

Seven communist guerillas attacked Udorn Royal Thai Air Force Base, with three killed and one captured. One Thai security guard was killed.

The Pentagon reported that the total tonnage of bombs dropped to date in 1972 (800,000+ tons) exceeded the total dropped for all of 1971 (763,160 tons) and total tonnage dropped since February 1965 (7.55m tons) exceeded the total tonnage dropped in all of World War II by 3.5 times.

4 October

MACV ordered increased B-52 raids on the approaches to Saigon in order to deter any attacks on the city ahead of the U.S. Presidential election.

PAVN/VC sapper attacks on the villages of Xuyen Tho and Xuyen Phuoc near Danang resulted in two ARVN and 18 civilians killed and more than 100 civilians missing, eight PAVN/VC were reported killed.

5 October

F-111As resumed attacks on North Vietnam, hitting an air defense center near Điện Biên Phủ and a railroad siding.

6 October

PAVN forces attacked ARVN units on Route 13 20 miles (32 km) northwest of Saigon killing four ARVN.

PAVN forces attacked Mỹ Tho destroying a fuel depot and killing 16 ARVN.

The VC attacked a Leper colony near Danang killing one patient and wounding 20 others.

7 October

The PAVN attacked an ARVN position 6 miles (9.7 km) northwest of Kontum and the ARVN 23rd Division reported killing 349 PAVN for the loss of 35 ARVN.

Skirmishes continued on Route 13 with the PAVN holding three hamlets and also mounting an attack near Lái Thiêu only 9 miles (14 km) from Saigon.

ARVN 3rd Division forces were reported to have recaptured Tiên Phước.

PAVN forces attacked a FANK base in central Phnom Penh killing 36 FANK soldiers and capturing five M113s before being driven out by FANK forces with losses of 28 killed. The PAVN also blew up several spans of the bridge over the Tonlé Sap river.

8 October

ARVN forces killed 22 PAVN for the loss of three killed in fighting in three hamlets near Route 13, but failed to dislodge the PAVN from their positions.

8-11 October

After four days of negotiations in Paris, Le Duc Tho gave Kissinger documents outlining the North Vietnamese proposal for a peace agreement in Vietnam. The proposal dropped demands for the ouster of Thiệu and called for the withdrawal of all American troops, the release of all American prisoners of war and a ceasefire "in place" which would allow PAVN soldiers in South Vietnam to remain there. A tentative text was agreed upon by both sides.

9 October

The PAVN continued to hold the three hamlets of Xom Suoi, Anhoa and Phú Chánh near Route 13 despite ARVN efforts to remove them.

South Vietnamese Marines recaptured Triệu Phong district, northeast of Quảng Trị with minimal resistance.

10 October

McGovern announced that if elected President, on his inauguration day he would immediately cease all military action against North Vietnam and all support for South Vietnam and would then send his Vice-President Sargent Shriver to Hanoi to negotiate the release of U.S. POWs.

11 October

U.S. Navy jets attacked the Gia Lâm railway yard in Hanoi. An explosion in the French mission complex across the Red River and 3 miles (4.8 km) southwest of the railway yard severely injured chief diplomat Pierre Susini, who later died of his wounds. Five North Vietnamese employees of the mission were also killed. The French and North Vietnamese blamed the U.S., while the U.S. said the damage may have been caused by a falling SA-2 missile. The nearby Algerian and Indian diplomatic missions were also damaged.

U.S. intelligence released details of a COSVN directive issued in mid-September saying that the recent attacks around Saigon were to be the last and "most decisive" phase of the Easter Offensive. It was believed that the recent attacks by small units of the PAVN 7th Division were diversionary and a larger attack on Saigon was imminent.

12 October

The U.S. imposed new restrictions on raids around central Hanoi after the damage to the French mission.

The ARVN 2nd Division recaptured Ba Tơ.

ARVN forces killed 31 PAVN for the loss of seven ARVN killed in fighting 7 miles (11 km) south of Bến Cát.

After bombarding Ben Het Camp with more than 1,500 rockets and artillery rounds, the PAVN overran the base killing at least nine ARVN and eight civilian dependents.

The PAVN/VC attacked an ARVN convoy near Vũng Tàu killing seven ARVN/FANK trainees and one U.S. adviser.

Speaking at a youth rally in Saigon, Thiệu said that "coalition with the Communists meant death" and that "We have to kill the Communists to the last man before we have peace."

Kissinger met with Nixon in Washington to explain the draft peace agreement with North Vietnam. Nixon approved the agreement subject to the agreement of Thiệu.

The U.S. Senate voted 84:2 to confirm Abrams as Army Chief of Staff, his confirmation had been delayed by investigation of his involvement in the Lavelle Affair.

12-13 October

A race riot on the USS Kitty Hawk operating on Yankee Station resulted in 46 crewman injured.

13 October

The JGS reported that at least 60 ARVN had been killed and more than 120 wounded at Ben Het and that fighting continued in the jungle east of the base.

USAF weapon systems officer Captain Jeffrey Feinstein became the fifth and last U.S. ace of the war when he and his pilot shot down a MiG-21 near Hanoi.

14 October

More than 140 Rangers who had evacuated from Ben Het were reportedly ambushed and scattered in the jungle east of the base. Only 27 Rangers were known to have reached safety and more than 180 civilian dependents remained missing.

15 October

The PAVN/VC shelled and then attacked an ARVN camp 75 miles (121 km) northeast of Saigon killing nine RF/PF and five dependents. In scattered fighting northwest and northeast of Saigon 39 PAVN and six ARVN were killed.

U.S. jets mounted their second heaviest raids on North Vietnam with more than 350 strikes on target, while B-52s bombed targets across all of Indochina. USAF jets shot down three VPAF MiG-21s.

Nixon Administration officials unofficially acknowledged that off-target U.S. bombs had probably hit the French and other diplomatic missions in Hanoi on 11 October.

16 October

Abrams was sworn in as Army Chief of Staff and immediately flew to Saigon for talks.

ARVN reported that Route 13 had been reopened to military traffic after the PAVN/VC had been rejected from the hamlets it controlled, while the PAVN/VC attempted to cut Highway 1 at Trảng Bàng.

ARVN abandoned Firebase 43 20 miles (32 km) south of Pleiku after heavy PAVN shelling.

17 October

Kissinger flew from Paris to Saigon and this, together with the visits by senior military advisors, Abrams and Gaylor, fueled speculation that a breakthrough had been achieved and a ceasefire was imminent. Thiệu was described as being nervous in the face of pressure from the U.S. and recent PAVN/VC attacks on the approaches to Saigon.

Ongoing PAVN/VC attacks on the highways leading into Saigon reduced the supply of food staples in the city as the ARVN was criticized for being slow to react to the attacks.

PAVN/VC captured six poorly defended villages in the Central Highlands, five 10 miles (16 km) west of Kontum and one southeast of Pleiku in what was said to be a campaign to implement COSVN Directive X-10 to plant the VC flag in as many South Vietnamese villages as possible.

PAVN/VC attacked a refugee camp 5 miles (8.0 km) from Quảng Ngai killing 11 refugees and six RF/PF for the loss of nine PAVN/VC killed. Eight homes and a school were destroyed.

18 October

Kissinger, Abrams and Bunker met with Thiệu in Saigon. In the meeting Thiệu rejected Hanoi's position that its forces would remain in place in South Vietnam. Rumors of an imminent ceasefire swept South Vietnam, with a U.S. adviser to the ARVN 9th Division saying that PAVN/VC ceasefire propaganda was very effective making it "hard to convince them to go out and fight."

The USAF said that a second F-111A had been lost over North Vietnam, with both crewmen missing.

18 October - 22 February 1973

Operation Black Lion III was an RLA offensive to capture Salavan and Paksan. The RLA were initially successful in capturing both cities but were ejected from Paksan by the PAVN in February.

19 October

In fighting southwest of Quảng Trị, ARVN Airborne and Rangers reported killing 14 PAVN and capturing six 37mm antiaircraft guns and one 130mm and one 122mm artillery guns.

PAVN launched artillery and ground attacks on Firebases Bastogne and Vega, west of Huế.

PAVN recaptured the hamlets of Binhhoa and Gialoc that they had been forced out of several days earlier.

Kissinger and Bunker met with Thiệu twice for a total of five hours, but no details of the meetings were released.

Laird denied that the Lavelle Affair showed that civilian control over the military was lacking but announced steps to increase civilian authority.

20 October

PAVN rockets hit Bungcau 10 miles (16 km) north of Saigon killing two RF/PF. ARVN troops killed 36 PAVN/VC 4 miles (6.4 km) south of Ben Cat while losing six killed. USAF and RVNAF fighter-bombers were reported to have killed a further 115 PAVN/VC in the same area. Rangers reported killing 50 PAVN/VC 30 miles (48 km) east of Saigon.

PAVN attacked an RF/PF outpost 20 miles (32 km) south of Pleiku resulting in 29 PAVN/VC and four RF/PF killed. The ARVN reported recapturing four hamlets lost recently in Phu Bon province.

Rangers fought a PAVN unit near Ba Tơ killing a reported 150 PAVN.

The Pentagon announced that a U.S. bomb had inadvertently struck the French mission in Hanoi on 11 October.

Operation Enhance Plus began with the objective of providing additional military equipment and support to South Vietnam. Over the next two months the U.S. gave South Vietnam 234 jet fighter planes, 32 transport planes, 277 helicopters, 72 tanks, 117 armored personnel carriers, artillery and 1,726 trucks. The cost of the equipment was more than $750 million ($5.7 billion in 2015 dollars). Moreover, most of the U.S. supplied equipment of two departing South Korean divisions (approximately 38,000 men) was also given to South Vietnam. In addition, the U.S. transferred title of its military bases and all the equipment on the bases to South Vietnam.

21 October

In fighting at Bungcau seven PAVN and two ARVN were killed. ARVN units found the bodies of 61 PAVN killed by B-52 strikes near Ben Cat.

Phạm Văn Đồng announced that North Vietnam would accept a ceasefire followed by a withdrawal of U.S. forces, the release of U.S. POWs and the formation of a coalition government in South Vietnam.

22 October

The PAVN fired 58 122mm rockets at Bien Hoa Air Base killing two South Vietnamese and wounding 13 South Vietnamese and 19 Americans and destroying one helicopter and damaging three light observation aircraft.

U.S. aircraft continued to bomb PAVN positions on the approaches to Saigon. A USMC A-4 accidentally bombed an ARVN position near Quản Lợi Base Camp killing three ARVN and wounding 17.

After meeting with Kissinger and despite a letter of support from Nixon, Thiệu said he would never sign the draft peace agreement with North Vietnam. He demanded that all PAVN soldiers be required to leave South Vietnam, recognition of the DMZ and South Vietnamese sovereignty and the existing South Vietnamese government structure.

Kissinger in Saigon cabled Nixon in Washington, "While we have a moral case for bombing North Vietnam when it does not accept our proposals, it seems to be really stretching the point to bomb North Vietnam when it has accepted our proposals and South Vietnam has not." After a final meeting with Thiệu, Kissinger flew to Phnom Penh on an unannounced visit where he met with Lon Nol.

The media was given its first access to Nakhon Phanom Royal Thai Navy Base and was informed that U.S. sensors and surveillance along the Ho Chi Minh Trail showed that PAVN infiltration had dropped to negligible levels.

23 October

In fighting near Firebases 40 and 41, Đức Cơ Camp and My Thach near Pleiku, 95 PAVN and one ARVN were reported killed.

In fighting 3 miles (4.8 km) east of Phù Mỹ district 73 PAVN were killed and 12 captured for the loss of five ARVN.

The New York Times reported that the mood in Cambodia was one of resignation in the face of irresistible forces. A ceasefire would leave the PAVN in control of more than half the country with the PAVN/VC occupying all of eastern Cambodia as a massive base area.

Souvanna Phouma said that he expected an Indochina-wide ceasefire to be announced by the end of the month and that in Laos this would take a similar form to the 1961 and 1962 neutralization agreements.

24 October

Nixon suspended bombing of North Vietnam above the 20th parallel as a sign of goodwill towards North Vietnam and pressure on Thiệu.

U.S. advisors were reported to be conducted an intensive retraining program for the entire ARVN with an emphasis on basic infantry tactics and small arms employment due to poor performance during the Easter Offensive, an influx of new replacements and ongoing deficiencies in ARVN training.

Thiệu said that all peace proposals negotiated in Paris were unacceptable and that there were great difficulties in achieving a ceasefire, but that a ceasefire could come quickly. He also said that "The Communists could only hope to win if our ally betrays us and sells us out, but our main ally will never betray us. He has invested so much blood and money."

The USAF dismissed all charges against Lavelle.

25 October

PAVN/VC conducted 113 attacks across South Vietnam in what was seen as an attempt to seize as much territory as possible before an imminent ceasefire. A rocket attack on Danang Air Base killed one U.S. civilian and nine South Vietnamese civilians outside the base. A rocket attack on Hội An killed four civilians and wounded 35. A rocket attack on Tri Tam 36 miles (58 km) northwest of Saigon killed ten civilians and one ARVN and wounded 37 civilians.

North Vietnam broadcast publicly the terms of the draft peace agreement and accused the United States of negotiating in bad faith saying that the terms of a ceasefire agreement had been agreed, but that the U.S. had backed off signing "claiming that it had difficulties in Saigon."

South Vietnam's Foreign Minister Trần Văn Lắm briefed the ambassadors from Australia, Japan, Laos, the Philippines, Thailand and West Germany on the current peace proposals.

26 October

Despite South Vietnamese opposition to the draft peace agreement and the charges by North Vietnam that the U.S. was negotiating in bad faith, Kissinger declared "Peace is at hand" in Vietnam and that a final agreement could be achieved after one more three-four day negotiating session.

South Vietnam announced that it was "ready to accept a cease-fire" but "would never accept a political settlement which goes against the interests and aspirations of the 17 million South Vietnamese people."

Xuân Thủy said that the U.S. and North Vietnam had resolved all outstanding points on 17 October, that a ceasefire agreement was scheduled to be signed on 31 October and called on the U.S. to honor that commitment.

Heavy fighting was reported in Laos, particularly in the Plain of Jars area and near Saravane as each side sought to maximize their territory before any ceasefire.

27 October

PAVN/VC conducted 125 attacks across South Vietnam, while ARVN forces were ordered to contest all PAVN/VC attempts to control the countryside before any ceasefire.

Speaking at a rally of South Vietnamese political leaders, Thiệu said that his "minimum demand" for a ceasefire was the withdrawal of all North Vietnamese forces from South Vietnam.

28 October

PAVN/VC conducted 138 attacks across South Vietnam, including seizing 13 hamlets and cutting three highways near Saigon. U.S. aircraft conducted 329 airstrikes over South Vietnam to counter the attacks, including 51 in the Mekong Delta to forestall any attacks there. Allied intelligence said that the PAVN/VC may have been relying on outdated instructions to seize territory before a ceasefire was signed on 31 October, causing them to "jump the gun" and exposing them to strong counter-attacks.

Trần Văn Lắm said that the draft peace agreement would amount to a surrender of South Vietnam and was unacceptable. He said that all North Vietnamese forces must be withdrawn and the DMZ reestablished, neither of which were addressed in the agreement.

28 October - 22 February 1973

Campaign 972 was a PAVN offensive that effectively succeeded in cutting Laos in two. The operation ended with the ceasefire pursuant to the Vientiane Treaty ending the Laotian Civil War.

29 October

PAVN/VC conducted another 138 attacks across South Vietnam, including seizing 17 hamlets within a 45 miles (72 km) radius of Saigon and cut Highway 1 west and east of Saigon with 14 PAVN/VC killed. The PAVN fired artillery and conducted ground assaults against three outposts northwest of Kontum and fired artillery into Kontum killing four civilians and wounding 11. In fighting southwest of Quảng Trị, ARVN Airborne killed 49 PAVN for the loss of two killed.

Following a 1,000+ round artillery barrage, the PAVN attacked Dak Seang Camp forcing its 300 Ranger defenders to abandon it by nightfall.

South Vietnamese police were reported to have increased patrols and arrests in Saigon and other cities in preparation for the possible ceasefire.

The Nixon Administration said that the peace agreement would not be signed by 31 October, but remained optimistic that the final details would be resolved soon.

30 October

The JGS reported that of the 21 hamlets near Saigon occupied by the PAVN/VC, all but six had been recaptured.

Four PAVN rockets hit Huế killing two civilians and wounding two.

Five PAVN rockets hit a FANK ammunition dump 8 miles (13 km) southwest of Phnom Penh killing five FANK and wounding 30 others.

31 October

PAVN forces overran a 300-man Ranger camp 1 mile (1.6 km) west of Ba Tơ. In fighting north and south of Đăk Tô, the ARVN reported killing 60 PAVN.

PAVN forces again captured Quế Sơn town in the continued seesaw fighting for the area. An ammunition explosion near the Thủ Đức Military Academy killed three ARVN.

In one of the final American special forces operations of the war, an intelligence-gathering mission near Cửa Việt Base, Navy SEAL petty officer Michael E. Thornton saved the life of his commanding officer, Lieutenant Thomas R. Norris; he would later be awarded the Medal of Honor, the latest action in the war for which it was awarded. There were only a dozen Navy SEALs still in Vietnam at the time of the mission.

North Vietnam was reported to have begun large-scale infiltration of troops and supplies into South Vietnam over the preceding ten days in preparation for a ceasefire in place.

== November ==
1 November

In fighting at Tân Phú Trung, near Củ Chi the ARVN reported killing 142 PAVN and capturing 11 for the loss of seven ARVN killed. The PAVN captured two hamlets in Long Thành district but were forced out for the loss of 39 PAVN and six ARVN killed.

A U.S. Army CH-47C #69-17119 was shot down near Mỹ Tho, killing all 17 Americans onboard.

More than 200 RLA troops were killed when PAVN forces supported by tanks overran their base at Namthorn Buk Kwan.

PAVN forces captured the district capital of Trapeng Kaleng, 35 miles (56 km) west of Phnom Penh.

Thiệu denounced the draft peace agreement as "a surrender of the South Vietnamese people to the Communists." Retired general Dương Văn Minh denounced the proposed ceasefire in place saying that forces should be withdrawn into regrouping areas.

Long Boret said he was optimistic about peace after a briefing by Rogers in which he was assured that the U.S. would push for the withdrawal of all foreign forces and equipment from Cambodia and Laos.

2 November

PAVN/VC forces launched more than 142 attacks across South Vietnam. A PAVN tank-infantry assault overran Đức Cơ Camp forcing its Ranger defenders to retreat to positions 500 yards (460 m) to the east, three tanks were reported destroyed by airstrikes.

ARVN forces engaged the PAVN in a rubber plantation east of An Lộc killing 151 PAVN for the loss of four ARVN killed.

Nixon said that a ceasefire agreement would not be signed until all outstanding issues were resolved and rejected any deadline imposed by the presidential election.

The U.S. was reported to be delivering numerous new aircraft to the RVNAF in an effort to coax Thiệu into accepting a revised ceasefire agreement. Among the new aircraft were C-130s which were not previously planned to be provided to South Vietnam.

3 November

In continued fighting east of An Lộc ARVN forces killed 32 PAVN.

PAVN/VC conducted more than 117 attacks across South Vietnam, including an attack on an RF/PF outpost 4 miles (6.4 km) west of Pleiku that killed eight ARVN. B-52s conducted heavy raids against PAVN infiltration routes in the Central Highlands.

U.S. intelligence reported that PAVN reinforcements, including an armored regiment, were moving across the DMZ into Quảng Trị province. The move was seen as an effort by the PAVN to match U.S. equipment deliveries before any ceasefire in place.

North Vietnam criticized Nixon for trying to impose additional terms beyond those agreed by Kissinger in October. McGovern accused Nixon of a "cruel political deception", pretending that a peace agreement was near as a re-election strategy.

4 November

Following seesaw fighting, the ARVN recaptured Xom Suoi 23 miles (37 km) north of Saigon.

U.S. jets conducted extensive air raids on North Vietnam below the 20th parallel.

The New York Times reported that the VC cadre numbering 40-60,000 remained intact in South Vietnam and would pose an ongoing threat to the South Vietnamese government control after any ceasefire.

On the campaign trail Nixon said that there were "some details still to be negotiated" but he was confident that such a peace agreement would be achieved based on "honor" and not "surrender." McGovern warned Americans not to "buy this Nixon line on peace." saying "He has no plan for ending this war. He has not let go of General [Nguyen Van] Thieu. He's not going to let that corrupt Thieu regime in Saigon collapse. He's going to stay there. He's going to keep our troops there. He's going to keep the bombers flying. He's going to confine our prisoners to their cells in Hanoi for whatever time it takes for him to keep his friend General Thieu in office."

Thiệu offered his own peace proposal, whereby North Vietnam and the U.S. would sign an agreement providing for an end to bombing of the North and the return of POWs, followed by South Vietnam negotiating a ceasefire with North Vietnam and the VC, following which a political settlement and peace treaty would be agreed.

5 November

PAVN/VC conducted 102 attacks across South Vietnam. In continued fighting in Bình Dương province, the ARVN killed 23 PAVN/VC for the loss of six killed and multiple B-52 strikes were conducted in the area. In fighting in Kiến Phong Province the ARVN killed 68 PAVN and captured five in three clashes, for the loss of four ARVN killed. In fighting between Pleiku and Kontum the ARVN killed 35 PAVN.

U.S. jets continued to strike targets in North Vietnam below the 20th parallel and in Quảng Trị province to prevent PAVN reinforcements moving into the south.

McGovern said that Nixon had misled the public into believing that peace was near and that the war was intensifying. Rogers said that he expected North Vietnam to resume peace talks soon and that several more weeks would be required to reach a peace agreement.

6 November

Three U.S. Army helicopters, one AH-1 and two OH-6s were shot down south of Danang resulting in two U.S. crewmen killed.

The New York Times reported that Thiệu was able to influence peace negotiations by using the threat of South Vietnamese collapse to undermine the Nixon Administration's goal of "peace with honor."

7 November

Nixon won reelection with 60.7 percent of the vote.

B-52s conducted their most intensive bombing of a single province, Quảng Trị, with 70 aircraft dropping approximately 2,000 tons of bombs in a 24 hour period.

8 November

South Korean command in Saigon announced that its 38,500 soldiers had withdrawn from combat into their base areas in preparation for leaving South Vietnam.

Hanoi asserted that the October draft peace agreement covered the release of all civilian and military prisoners held by South Vietnam.

10 November

PAVN forces attacked ARVN units at Xom Suoi resulting in 22 PAVN and five ARVN killed.

B-52s struck targets south of the 20th Parallel and down into Quảng Trị province to prevent reinforcement of PAVN units, however PAVN artillery fired more than 1,000 rounds in Quảng Trị showing that supplies were still getting through.

U.S. jets bombed areas near Route 4, 14 miles (23 km) south of Phnom Penh, while four FANK soldiers were killed in clashes near Kampong Speu.

Haig and John Negroponte flew into Saigon and met with Thiệu. Haig carried a personal letter from Nixon urging Thiệu to accept a ceasefire agreement as soon as possible. At the same time the U.S. was engaging in discussions with Canada, Indonesia, Hungary and Poland regarding the formation of a force to supervise any ceasefire.

Souvanna Phouma met with Pathet Lao official Phoumi Vongvichit in Vientiane raising hopes that peace negotiations were progressing. Meanwhile heavy fighting was reported around Dong Hene and Luang Prabang. U.S. officials confirmed that the charred bodies of two women found when RLA forces recaptured Kengkok were those of missionaries Evelyn Anderson and Beatrice Kosin, who had been captured by the PAVN, while two other missionaries remained missing.

11 November

Long Binh Post, the largest U.S. base in South Vietnam, was handed over to the South Vietnamese.

The U.S. reported that more North Vietnamese heavy antiaircraft guns had been moved south of the 20th Parallel since the U.S. had stopped bombing north of there and three U.S. Navy A-7s were shot down in the preceding 24 hour period.

Ten USAF C-141 Starlifters delivered 20 A-1 Skyraiders to Phnom Penh for use by the Khmer Air Force.

12 November

Thirty-five PAVN 122mm rockets hit Bien Hoa Air Base killing three children and wounding seven RVNAF crewmen and four civilians and destroying one F-5 and blowing up a napalm storage dump.

The JGS reported that PAVN artillery had fired more than 1,000 rounds against Marine positions near Quảng Trị while 19 PAVN and seven Marines were killed in clashes. Airborne forces were reported to be fighting to recapture Firebase Anne 8 miles (13 km) southwest of Quảng Trị.

A PAVN/VC mortar attack on Vị Thanh killed six civilians and wounded 30.

Following two days of talks with Thiệu, Haig flew to Phnom Penh for four hours of talks with Lon Nol.

13 November

The PAVN fired 51 122mm rockets at Luang Prabang Airport damaging two T-28s and three O-1s.

MACV reported that in the preceding month more than 5,000 PAVN had moved from bases in Cambodia into hamlets near Saigon presumably in preparation for a ceasefire. Meanwhile U.S. aircraft continued to hit PAVN supply lines below the 20th Parallel and throughout South Vietnam to reduce PAVN infiltration.

Haig returned to Washington and briefed Nixon and Kissinger at Camp David.

14 November

PAVN battalions were reported to be withdrawing from the DMZ area and around Saigon. It was unclear if this was a rotation of units or preparation for a ceasefire.

In an attempt to overcome Thiệu's objection to the draft peace agreement, Nixon wrote him that "You have my absolute assurance that if Hanoi fails to abide by the terms of this agreement, it is my intention to take swift and severe retaliatory action." Nixon instructed Kissinger to present to the North Vietnamese Thiệu's 69 proposed changes to the draft peace agreement even though Kissinger warned him that the changes were "preposterous."

More than 300 U.S. fight-bomber strikes and 11 B-52 strikes were made on North Vietnam between the DMZ and 20 miles (32 km) south of Thanh Hóa.

15 November

Canada, Hungary, Indonesia and Poland agreed in principle to participate in a commission to supervise any ceasefire in Vietnam.

In a five hour battle near Quảng Trị the South Vietnamese reported killing 59 PAVN with a further 25 killed by airstrikes, for the loss of five South Vietnamese.

South Vietnam reported that the bodies of more than 50 PAVN/VC killed by B-52 strikes had been found in Quảng Tín province.

Willard E. Chambers, CORDS assistant deputy in Military Region I, quit his job claiming that pacification was being mismanaged by the South Vietnamese and U.S.

16 November

The U.S. claimed to have destroyed PAVN 68 ammunition trucks near Quảng Khê, north of the DMZ.

PAVN and Pathet Lao forces were reported to have encircled Luang Prabang.

17 November

The U.S. flew over 150 airstrikes north of Quảng Trị in support of South Vietnamese forces who had received over 1,200 rounds of artillery, mortar and rocket fire. U.S. jets conducted 140 strikes against North Vietnam, destroying 64 missile canisters at a SAM supply depot north of the DMZ.

Cambodia reported that its forces had reopened Route 4 from Phnom Penh to the port of Kompong Som and Route 5 from Phnom Penh to Battambang Province.

18 November

Bad weather forced a reduction in U.S. airstrikes on North Vietnam with only 30 missions flown. ARVN forces killed seven PAVN/VC near Mỹ Lai.

20 November

Kissinger returned to Paris to meet with Lê Đức Thọ. Kissinger introduced Thiệu's objections to the draft peace agreement and Thọ accused Kissinger of deception. Both North Vietnam and South Vietnam were intransigent, the North Vietnamese demanding the agreement be signed as agreed with the United States, while South Vietnam demanded numerous changes.

The South Vietnamese Senate voted to support Thiệu's opposition to any peace settlement that didn't provide for the complete withdrawal of North Vietnamese forces.

The Pentagon stated that the delivery of new military equipment to South Vietnam (Operation Enhance) was largely completed.

21 November

The PAVN fired eight 122mm rockets at Danang Air Base, killing one civilian and wounding 11 in an adjacent hamlet. The PAVN fired more than 1,000 artillery and rocket rounds at South Vietnamese forces north of Quảng Trị, killing 12 Marines while also losing 12 killed. B-52s launched more than 80 strikes on both sides of the DMZ. In fighting around Thanh Han 20 miles (32 km) southwest of Pleiku, more than 134 PAVN and six ARVN were reported killed.

A PAVN assault on an ARVN base at Thanh Giao 18 miles (29 km) southwest of Pleiku was repulsed for the loss of 40 PAVN killed. ARVN forces killed a further 85 PAVN in fighting in Châu Đốc and Kiến Tường provinces.

The U.S. Court of Appeal for the Seventh Circuit overturned the five convictions in the Chicago Seven case.

22 November

The first B-52 to be downed by enemy fire in the war was hit by a SAM while on a raid over Vinh. The crew was forced to abandon the damaged aircraft over Thailand. North Vietnam claimed this was the 19th B-52 they had shot down.

In fighting north of Quảng Trị, the Marines received more than 1,000 rounds of artillery and mortar fire losing 17 killed.

RLA forces recaptured Saravane which they had abandoned on 14 November.

Lê Đức Thọ introduced new demands at the negotiations: that all U.S. civilian contractors be withdrawn at the same time as U.S. forces and that U.S. POWs would only be released at the same time as prisoners held by South Vietnam.

U.S. intelligence released a North Vietnamese directive to capture as much territory as possible before a ceasefire began and then to strictly observe the ceasefire for a period of 60 days.

23 November

B-52s continued raids over North Vietnam, concentrating on the area around Vinh. In fighting in the Mekong Delta the South Vietnamese claimed 58 PAVN/VC killed for the loss of three ARVN.

24 November

The U.S. and Thailand announced that a substantial U.S. aviation presence would be maintained in Thailand for an unspecified period after any Vietnamese ceasefire.

42 B-52 strikes hit Vinh and Đồng Hới. The JGS reported that 38 PAVN/VC had been killed in fighting near Gò Dầu district.

The New York Times reported that the progress of peace negotiations had thrown Thiệu "off balance".

25 November

In two attacks near the ARVN base at Thanh Giao, 74 PAVN and 9 ARVN were reported killed. In fighting north of Quảng Trị, the Marines received 770 rounds of artillery and mortar fire, losing six killed while killing five PAVN.

The peace negotiations ended in an impasse with the parties agreeing to resume discussions on 4 December.

Anticipating that the peace agreement would require release of all political prisoners, the government of South Vietnam began charging people detained for political reasons with petty crimes, thus ensuring their continued incarceration. Amnesty International estimated that South Vietnam had imprisoned 200,000 people for political reasons, and would release only 5,000 after the peace agreement came into effect.

A Gallup poll found that 59% of Americans approved Nixon's handling of the war with 33% opposed.

26 November

In fighting in the foothills southwest of Quảng Trị, Airborne forces killed 32 PAVN for the loss of 16 killed. Two PAVN 122mm rockets hit Quảng Ngãi killing two children and wounding ten other civilians. A PAVN mortar attack on Kontum killed one civilian and wounded six. A PAVN mortar attack on an ARVN base northwest of Saigon killed two ARVN.

27 November

Heavy fighting continued in the foothills southwest of Quảng Trị, with Airborne forces, supported by 18 B-52 strikes, killing 31 PAVN for the loss of one killed.

South Vietnamese Marines closed in on Cửa Việt Base supported by B-52 strikes. The Marines received more than 600 rounds of mortar fire and killed 12 PAVN for the loss of five Marines.

The New York Times reported that more than 10,000 U.S. civilian advisers and technicians would remain in South Vietnam to support South Vietnamese forces after any ceasefire.

China and North Vietnam signed an agreement in Peking providing for Chinese aid in 1973.

28 November

Six U.S. fighter-bombers accidentally bombed civilians 2.5 miles (4.0 km) southwest of Hội An killing 21 and wounding 30.

A VC rocket attack on Đức Phổ killed four civilians and wounded eight.

29 November

Bad weather reduced U.S. airstrikes across Vietnam and slowed down South Vietnamese offensive operations in Quảng Trị province.

The New York Times reported on the massive influx of refugees into Phnom Penh from the countryside, the huge disparity of wealth within the city and corruption with the government.

30 November

Nixon met with the Joint Chiefs of Staff who approved the outline of the peace plan. It was reported that Nixon had advised that flagrant violations of the ceasefire would be met with airstrikes. Nixon subsequently met with Nguyễn Phú Duc, Thiệu's special envoy. The White House stated that it would no longer provide public announcements on U.S. troop withdrawals now that the number had fallen below 27,000.

== December ==
1 December

The U.S. reported no military deaths in Indochina in the preceding week for the first time since January 1965. South Vietnamese losses were 480 killed while PAVN/VC losses were estimated at 1,896 killed. Thirty PAVN rockets hit Bien Hoa Air Base.

PAVN rockets fired on Kompong Cham killed two civilians and wounded 20.

ARVN Major general Trần Thanh Phong, deputy commander of Military Region II, was killed when the RVNAF plane he was travelling on crashed in bad weather on approach to Tuy Hoa Air Base. Four other South Vietnamese and two USAID officials were also killed in the crash.

In scattered fighting across South Vietnam 85 PAVN/VC and two ARVN were reported killed.

The New York Times reported that VC radio was increasingly broadcasting the names of members of the Provisional Revolutionary Government of the Republic of South Vietnam in an apparent attempt to popularize them after the ceasefire.

2 December

South Vietnamese Marines were reported to be bogged down in heavy rain in Quảng Trị, despite B-52 strikes on PAVN positions.

The New York Times reported that in Saigon the expectation was that a peace agreement, substantially similar to the October proposal, would be finalized within the next few days.

3 December

The Rangers abandoned a position 8 miles (13 km) southwest of Kontum, killing five PAVN, while an attack on Mo Duc was repulsed with nine PAVN killed. A U.S. AH-1 was shot down by an SA-7 50 miles (80 km) northwest of Saigon, both crewmen were rescued.

U.S. aircraft were reported to have conducted more than 90 airstrikes against supply lines in North Vietnam.

4 December

Kissinger returned to Paris for further meetings with Lê Đức Thọ. Kissinger claimed that the North Vietnamese had changed their position on 20 points agreed to previously.

Ten PAVN rockets hit Bien Hoa Air Base causing no damage. In fighting in Quảng Trị, northeast of the city the Marines killed 37 PAVN and captured one for the loss of one Marine killed, while south of the city Airborne forces killed 24 PAVN.

ARVN forces repulsed a PAVN attack on Ngo Trang 7 miles (11 km) north of Kontum killing 65 PAVN for the loss of four killed.

RLA forces were reported to have killed 30 PAVN in Saravane.

5 December

The Paris talks were suspended for a day amid reports that Kissinger was seeking to clarify the status of PAVN troops remaining in South Vietnam after a ceasefire.

New Australian Prime Minister Gough Whitlam announced an end to conscription and that Australia would pursue diplomatic ties with China.

PAVN forces attacked an outpost 9 miles (14 km) north of Kontum with 35 ARVN reported missing and 15 PAVN killed. Marines near Quảng Trị killed 21 PAVN for the loss of three killed. ARVN forces killed 33 PAVN for the loss of six killed in southwest Pleiku province.

B-52s attacked PAVN supply depots near Dong Hoi and PAVN positions near Quảng Trị and Kontum.

RLA forces captured Paksong on the Bolaven Plateau.

6 December

Peace talks resumed again in Paris after Kissinger received instructions from Washington.

A PAVN rocket attack on Tan Son Nhut Air Base killed eight South Vietnamese and one American and five civilians in a nearby village and damaged two U.S. rescue helicopters. PAVN forces also attacked Thủ Đức, 10 miles (16 km) north of Saigon. U.S. aircraft conducted airstrikes against suspected launch sites around the base.

Nine B-52 strikes and more than 90 tactical airstrikes were conducted against PAVN supply lines in North Vietnam.

7 December

The Paris peace talks continued with the most contentious issue reported to be the status of PAVN troop after the ceasefire, with the South Vietnamese government insisting that all PAVN troops must be withdrawn. The State Department was said to have alerted more than 100 staff for deployment to South Vietnam to monitor the ceasefire.

Airborne forces overran a PAVN fortified position 6 miles (9.7 km) southwest of Quảng Trị killing 20 PAVN for the loss of three Airborne soldiers. The bodies of a further 30 PAVN killed in airstrikes were also found. ARVN forces captured the site used for launching the rocket attacks on Tan Son Nhut finding the bodies of 30 PAVN/VC killed by airstrikes.

35 B-52 strikes and 90 tactical airstrikes were made against PAVN positions and supply lines north of the DMZ with more than 600 tons of bombs dropped.

Four PAVN frogmen blew up the Hong Kong freighter Bright Star docked in Phnom Penh killing one crewman and three Cambodian laborers, sentries killed three of the frogmen while the fourth escaped.

8 December

27 B-52 and 40 tactical airstrikes were mounted against North Vietnam. The South Vietnamese government reported 82 attacks across the country resulting in 244 PAVN/VC killed for the loss of 16 ARVN.

Pathet Lao forces started a new offensive against RLA positions on the Plain of Jars overrunning two RLA positions.

9 December

Airstrikes around the DMZ continued for a third day with more than 20 B-52 and 60 tactical airstrikes. Airborne forces killed 30 PAVN and captured two for the loss of seven killed in fighting in the foothills west of Quảng Trị.

10 December

The South Vietnamese government reported a decline in PAVN/VC attacks across the country. At Quảng Trị, Airborne forces killed 53 PAVN. In fighting near Tam Kỳ ARVN forces killed 40 PAVN/VC. In the Mekong Delta the VC attacked two RF/PF outposts killing 16 RF/PF and their dependents. 18 B-52 strikes were mounted against North Vietnam as far north as Đồng Hới, while 24 strikes were made in South Vietnam.

Presidential military aide General Alexander Haig briefed Nixon on the progress of the peace talks.

11 December

B-52s continued strikes on North Vietnam as far north as Đồng Hới and with other raids north of Saigon. Following the tip of a defector, the ARVN intercepted a PAVN battalion infiltrating from Cambodia and killed 79 PAVN in a jungle area 42 miles (68 km) northwest of Saigon.

12 December

Thiệu proposed an indefinite ceasefire to begin before Christmas and the exchange of prisoners between South and North Vietnam, however he said that he still opposed the "false peace" in the draft peace agreement.

The PAVN battalion which had infiltrated from Cambodia retreated into the Parrot's Beak area. ARVN forces killed 30 PAVN/VC 6 miles (9.7 km) west of Cà Mau. Four ARVN were killed in fighting near Bearcat Base. B-52s continued strikes north of the DMZ for a sixth day.

The Pathet Lao proposed an immediate ceasefire to be supervised by the Pathet Lao, Royal Lao Government and the International Control Commission, with the withdrawal of all U.S. forces within 90 days of signing and the formation of a coalition government.

13 December

The peace talks ended with the outstanding issue being Thiệu's insistence on South Vietnamese control over all its territory, which would require that all North Vietnamese forces be withdrawn.

U.S. sources reported that more than 100 PAVN tanks and thousands of soldiers had started moving from North Vietnam through mountain passes onto the Ho Chi Minh Trail in Laos. While B-52s struck the passes, tactical airstrikes were limited by bad weather, however more than 190 strikes were conducted in northern South Vietnam.

RLA forces captured Muong Phalane from PAVN forces after a monthlong operation.

14 December

Nixon met Kissinger and Haig in Washington and the three of them agreed on an intensified bombing campaign against North Vietnam to, in the words of Haig, "strike hard... and keep on striking until the enemy's will was broken." The weapon of choice would be the B-52, which had never been used before to strike targets in the vicinity of Hanoi and the city of Haiphong. Nixon ordered the Joint Chiefs of Staff to commence planning for the operation.

14 B-52 missions, by up to three planes each, were conducted against North Vietnam dropping 1,260 tons of bombs on supply bases around Đồng Hới with a further 19 missions conducted in South Vietnam.

A PAVN rocket attack on Bien Hoa Air Base killed six civilians in nearby houses. PAVN/VC mortar attacks caused a fire at a fuel depot on the Saigon river and a PAVN/VC sapper attack caused massive explosion at an ammunition dump 7 miles (11 km) southeast of Saigon.

All members of the New Zealand Army Training Team Vietnam were withdrawn from South Vietnam ending New Zealand's involvement in the war.

15 December

48 B-52s dropped over 1,200 tons of bombs on targets near Đồng Hới with a further seven missions around Quảng Trị and three 18 miles (29 km) southwest of An Lộc. In fighting 2 miles (3.2 km) southeast of Quảng Trị Airborne units killed 44 PAVN for the loss of one killed. Five PAVN and two ARVN were killed in fighting near Đức Cơ Camp. Eighteen PAVN were killed in fighting near Thanh Giao camp near Pleiku. Three rockets attacks were made against Bien Hoa Air Base killing two civilians.

A Federal court heard testimony that for eight years heroin had been smuggled into the U.S. concealed in the bodies of U.S. war dead.

16 December

At a press conference, Kissinger said that the negotiations had failed to achieve what Nixon regarded as a "just and fair agreement" to end the war and that "the United States will not be blackmailed...stampeded...[or] charmed into an agreement until its conditions are right." Kissinger also warned South Vietnam that "no other party will have a veto over our actions." but blamed North Vietnam for failing to reach an agreement. North Vietnam charged that Kissinger had once again breached the agreement not to discuss the content of the talks, denied that they had introduced new conditions and blamed the U.S. for the impasse. The impasse centred around the recognition of South Vietnamese sovereignty (including the withdrawal of PAVN forces) and the composition of the supervisory body.

Thai premier Thanom Kittikachorn approved the use of Nakhon Phanom Royal Thai Navy Base for the relocation of MACV and 7th Air Force headquarters following the implementation of any ceasefire in Vietnam.

The PAVN fired 20 rockets at Bien Hoa Air Base killing two civilians while ARVN 18th Division commander, Brigadier general Lê Minh Đảo said that PAVN forces were building up near the base. B-52 flew eight missions against North Vietnam and 22 missions in South Vietnam including five near the DMZ.

17 December

American warplanes dropped new naval mines off the coast of North Vietnam, including at Haiphong and other locations above the 20th parallel.

Airborne forces killed 151 PAVN in a two day battle around Firebase Anne, 8 miles (13 km) southwest of Quảng Trị for the loss of two Airborne killed. In the Central Highlands 50 PAVN and five ARVN were reported killed, while 36 B-52s dropped 1,000 tons of bombs on PAVN staging areas 30 miles (48 km) southwest of Pleiku. Five B-52 missions were flown against North Vietnam just north of the western DMZ.

18 December

Operation Linebacker II began. Better known as the "Christmas bombings", 129 B-52s and smaller tactical aircraft struck at targets in North Vietnam, including around the city of Hanoi. North Vietnam shot down three B-52s. The White House stated that the raids would continue "until such time as a settlement is arrive at" including the release of all U.S. POWs and an internationally recognized ceasefire was in force, adding that "we are not going to allow the peace talks to be used as cover for another offensive."

B-52D Tail gunner Staff Sgt Samuel Turner shot down a VPAF MiG-21, scoring the first of only two air gunner kills of the war.

60 B-52s hit target around Quảng Trị in support of ARVN Airborne units fighting at Firebase Anne.

The last Australian soldiers of the Australian Army Training Team Vietnam left South Vietnam, ending Australia's involvement in the war.

A rocket attack on Luang Prabang Airport damaged two aircraft and a fuel depot.

The House Armed Services Committee held that the raids on North Vietnam approved by USAF General John D. Lavelle, "were not only proper, but essential."

19 December

Hanoi described the renewed bombing as barbaric and insane. Xuân Thủy responded to Kissinger's remarks of 16 December, accusing the U.S. of derailing the peace talks by attempting to introduce 126 changes to the draft October peace agreement at the meeting on 20 November.

Three B-52s and two fighter-bombers were reported to have been lost with 15 crewmen missing in the Linebacker attacks.

Haig met with Thiệu in Saigon to deliver a letter from Nixon. Nixon said it was his "irrevocable intention" to achieve a peace agreement with North Vietnam, preferably with the cooperation of South Vietnam, "but, if necessary, alone." He pledged continue military support to South Vietnam if Hanoi violated the agreement. Haig told Thiệu, "Under no circumstances will President Nixon accept a veto from Saigon in regard to a peace agreement."

North Vietnamese coastal artillery fire hit the USS Goldsborough killing three crewmen.

The Royal Lao Government responded to the Pathet Lao 12 December peace proposal rejecting its terms.

20 December

Radio Hanoi reported that 215 people had been killed and 325 wounded in Hanoi and 45 killed and 131 wounded in Haiphong in the raids, while the U.S. denied accusations they were involved in terror bombing and said only military targets were being struck. North Vietnam shot down six B-52s, but depleted their supply of SAMs.

Thiệu kept Haig waiting for five hours before seeing him. He attempted to persuade Haig that the U.S. should require the withdrawal of all PAVN soldiers from South Vietnam in any peace agreement. Haig suggested to Nixon that if a peace agreement was not reached the U.S. could consider a unilateral disengagement from South Vietnam in exchange for the return of American POWs by North Vietnam.

In fighting around Quảng Trị, Airborne and Marine forces killed 154 PAVN for the loss of eight killed. Despite clear weather only 50 airstrikes were conducted in I Corps as U.S. air assets concentrated against North Vietnam.

FANK reported that fighting had broken out 12 miles (19 km) south of Phnom Penh and around the besieged town of Kompong Thom with more than 30 FANK soldiers killed in the preceding two weeks.

21 December

Fearing additional losses, the U.S. deployed only 30 B-52s to bomb mostly around Hanoi and Haiphong, nevertheless, four more B-52s were shot down. B-52 crew members complained that the flight patterns assigned to them increased their risk. Flight patterns were changed for subsequent days. The Cuban and Egyptian embassies in Hanoi were hit by bombs or debris, as were Soviet and Chinese ships in Haiphong.

The North Vietnamese and Vietcong delegations walked out of the Paris peace talks in protest at the renewed bombing, but called for another session on 28 December.

Leonid Brezhnev, speaking at an event marking the 50th anniversary of the Soviet Union, condemned the U.S. bombing and said that U.S.-Soviet relations hinged on the ending of the war.

In fighting around Quảng Trị, 83 PAVN and 10 South Vietnamese were reported killed.

FANK command reported that PAVN forces began an "all-out attack" on Konmpng Thom. FANK and ARVN forces began a joint offensive near Kompong Chrey, 16 miles (26 km) inside Cambodia.

A USAF AC-130A gunship operated by the 16th Special Operations Squadron was shot down by anti-aircraft fire near Ban Lao Ngam, killing all 14 crewmen.

22 December

The White House said that the bombing would continue until North Vietnam decided to resume negotiations "in a spirit of goodwill and in a constructive attitude." Nixon offered to suspend the U.S. bombing north of the 20th parallel on 31 December if Hanoi agreed to a 3 January meeting in Paris.

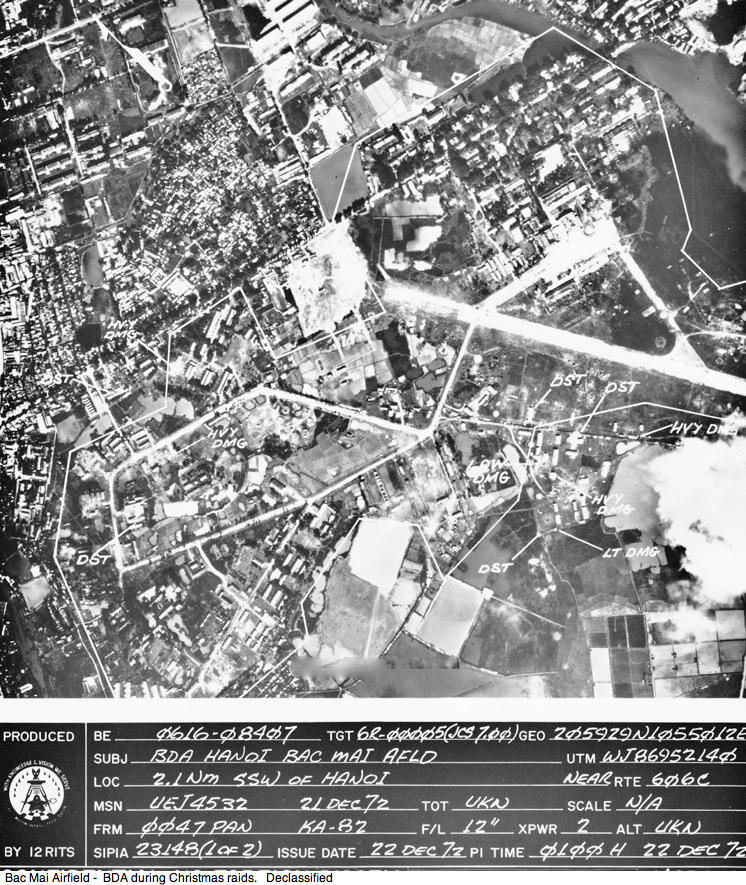
Bach Mai Airfield bomb damage assessment

Bach Mai Hospital in Hanoi was struck by seven bombs killing 18 people. The U.S. aircraft were targeting the adjacent Bach Mai Airfield, the VPAF's air defense command and control center.

41 U.S. religious leaders signed a letter condemning the bombing and there were antiwar protests in Times Square, New York.

23 December

USAF officials claimed that the performance of B-52s over Hanoi proved that the aircraft could penetrate Soviet air defenses, but declined to comment on North Vietnamese air defense performance for the first time. The East German embassy was damaged by bombs/debris. Opposition to the bombing was extensive among American politicians. In the Senate, 45 Senators responding to a poll opposed the bombing as compared to 19 who supported it.

PAVN forces supported by PT-76 tanks attacked an RLA held bridge over the Se Bang River 24 miles (39 km) north of Seno, Laos, capturing the position but losing 3 PT-76s destroyed. Continued fighting also occurred at Saravane which had been subject to intensive PAVN artillery bombardment.

Reuters reported on the plight of Amerasian children in South Vietnam who were shunned by society and often given up to orphanages.

24 December

South Vietnam began a Christmas ceasefire from 18:00 24 December to 18:00 25 December. The U.S. observed a similar 24-hour ceasefire in South Vietnam, while halting its raids on North Vietnam for 36 hours.

Xuân Thủy said that North Vietnam would not return to negotiations until the U.S. stopped bombing north of the 20th parallel.

Bob Hope performed his ninth and final Christmas show in South Vietnam at Tan Son Nhut Air Base. He endorsed the renewed bombing of North Vietnam and was awarded South Vietnam's highest civilian medal.

25 December

Hanoi claimed that thousands of civilians had been killed and more than 40,000 tons of bombs dropped in the U.S. "carpet-bombing" of Hanoi and Haiphong.

South Vietnam claimed that there had been 58 violations of the ceasefire resulting in 60 PAVN/VC, 40 ARVN and five civilians killed. A PAVN rocket attack on Da Nang Air Base killed two civilians and damaged five U.S. helicopters. U.S. aircraft attacked a 50 vehicle PAVN convoy near An Lộc, destroying 11 vehicles.

FANK command reported that 17 soldiers had been killed and more than 265 were missing in heavy fighting less than 2 miles (3.2 km) from the center of Kompong Thom.

26 December

After the Christmas truce, the U.S. conducted the largest B-52 raid of the war utilizing 120 B-52s. The U.S. lost two airplanes. 215 civilians were killed by bombs dropped on a heavily populated area of Hanoi. North Vietnam proposed a resumption of peace talks on 8 January.

27 December

MACV issued a detailed report of military targets hit in the Linebacker raids but made no comment on civilian losses.

In fighting around Quảng Trị, 69 PAVN were killed for the loss of five South Vietnamese. An RVNAF F-5 accidentally bombed a village 5 miles (8.0 km) north of Bien Hoa Air Base killing nine civilians.

Thiệu issued decree law 60 which effectively banned all parties other than his Democracy Party, forcing all his political opposition to dissolve or go underground.

The Cambodian Government acknowledged that more than 100,000 soldiers claimed to be serving in the military, more than one third of the army, did not exist and were ghosts created by corrupt officers.

Australia ceased all military aid to South Vietnam and ended a training program for Cambodian troops in Australia.

28 December

In fighting around Quảng Trị, 138 PAVN were killed and 10 captured for the loss of 29 South Vietnamese. A PAVN rocket attack on a training center near Da Nang killed three ARVN.

29 December

The New York Times reported that B-52 crews on Guam were shaken by their losses over North Vietnam in what was described as "the greatest air-defense system in history."

Austria, Belgium, Italy, the Netherlands and Sweden all condemned the Linebacker bombings.

30 December

Nixon ordered an end to Operation Linebacker II, but with bombing permitted south of the 20th parallel. Negotiations were scheduled to resume in Paris on January 8. Of 200 B-52s engaged in the operation, 15 were shot down as well as 11 other aircraft, while Hanoi claimed that 34 B-52s had been shot down. 61 B-52 crewmen were killed, captured, or missing. Prior to Linebacker II, during seven years of bombing, only one B-52 had been shot down. Destruction of North Vietnam's military and industrial capacity was substantial. North Vietnam said that 1,623 civilians had been killed in Hanoi and Haiphong, although most civilians had been evacuated from the cities before the bombing. 80 percent of North Vietnam's electrical power production capability had been eliminated. Nixon warned North Vietnam that the bombing would resume if the peace talks collapsed again. Many U.S. officials believed that the operation had been counterproductive given the losses incurred and Congressional and international opposition it has provoked. North Vietnam denied yeidling to the U.S. attacks, declared victory and claimed that heavy losses of American aircraft was the motive behind the bombing halt. General Maxwell Taylor, former Ambassador to South Vietnam, said terminating America's commitment to South Vietnam even without a peace agreement should be considered by the President.

U.S. intelligence sources said that North Vietnam had not sent policy directives to its forces in South Vietnam for over two months due to confusion over the status of the Paris peace talks resulting in "uncertainty" among its forces.

31 December

The South Vietnamese government announced that it would observe a 24-hour New Year ceasefire beginning at 18:00 on 31 December and ending at 18:00 on 1 January 1973. The U.S. refused to confirm if it would observe a ceasefire and conducted 211 airstrikes over South Vietnam and some strikes over North Vietnam before the South Vietnamese ceasefire came into effect.

U.S. military personnel in South Vietnam numbered 24,200.

31 December - 5 February 1973

Operation Maharat II was an RLA offensive to seize the intersection of Routes 7 and 13 from the Pathet Lao. The Pathet Lao withdrew in the face of overwhelming RLA forces.

== Year in numbers ==
Armed Force	Strength	KIA	Reference	Military costs - 1972	Military costs in 2026 US$	Reference
South Vietnam ARVN	1,048,000	39,587
United States	24,000	759
South Korea	36,790	380
Thailand	40
Australia
Philippines	50
New Zealand	50
North Vietnam

== See also ==
List of allied military operations of the Vietnam War (1972)
