= Combat Action Ribbon =

- Top: Navy Combat Action Ribbon; Bottom: Coast Guard Combat Action Ribbon
- Type: Service ribbon, personal decoration
- Awarded for: Active participation in ground or surface combat on or after December 7, 1941
- Presented by: United States Department of the Navy; U.S. Department of Homeland Security
- Eligibility: Satisfactory performance under enemy fire while actively participating in a ground or maritime engagement
- Status: Current issue
- Established: Navy Combat Action Ribbon (U.S. Department of the Navy): February 17, 1969; Coast Guard Combat Action Ribbon (U.S. Department of Homeland Security): July 16, 2008
- First award: Navy Combat Action Ribbon: 1969 (retroactive to March 1961)

Precedence
- Next (higher): Naval Service: Service achievement medals Coast Guard: Coast Guard Commandant's Letter of Commendation
- Equivalent: Air and Space Forces: Combat Action Medal
- Next (lower): Presidential Unit Citation
- Related: Combat Infantryman Badge (U.S. Army infantry and Special Forces equivalent); Combat Medical Badge (U.S. Army medical department equivalent); Combat Action Badge (U.S. Army other branch equivalent)

The Combat Action Ribbon (CAR) is a United States Navy, United States Coast Guard, and United States Marine Corps military decoration awarded to United States sea service members "who have actively participated in ground or surface combat." Coast guardsmen, Navy sailors, and Marines active in clandestine, stealth or special operations are deemed eligible for consideration of the award. The ribbon is awarded to members of the Navy and Marine Corps with a rank no higher than captain and colonel, respectively.

The U.S. Navy first authorized the Combat Action Ribbon on 17 February 1969. The Navy ribbon was originally retroactive to March 1961; in 1999 it was made retroactive to 7 December 1941.

The Coast Guard Combat Action Ribbon was authorized on 16 July 2008, and may be awarded to members of the Coast Guard in the rank of captain and below, "who have actively participated in ground or maritime combat." The Coast Guard ribbon is retroactive to 1 May 1975 (during the Vietnam war Coast Guard members were awarded the Navy Combat Action ribbon). Coast guardsmen in Vietnam riverine warfare operations were deemed eligible for award of the Navy Combat Action Ribbon.

Air combat does not meet the criteria for the Combat Action Ribbon; naval aviators, naval flight officers and enlisted naval air crewmen, while in the performance of aerial flight, are instead eligible for consideration for the Air Medal.

== Eligibility criteria ==
For a military member to be awarded a Combat Action Ribbon evidence must establish the member engaged the enemy, was under hostile fire, or was physically attacked by the enemy. The service member must have demonstrated satisfactory performance under enemy fire while actively participating in a ground or surface engagement. The Combat Action Ribbon will not be awarded to personnel for aerial combat, since the Strike/flight Air Medal provides recognition for aerial combat exposure; however, a pilot, flight officer/navigator, or other crew member forced to escape or evade, after being forced down, may be eligible for the award. Direct exposure to the detonation of an Improvised Explosive Device (IED) used by an enemy, with or without the immediate presence of enemy forces, constitutes active participation in a ground or surface engagement. Eligibility under this criterion is retroactive to 7 October 2001.

The Combat Action Ribbon is awarded to individuals only. The CAR is not awarded to a military unit, station, or group, although multiple individual service members (e.g., those stationed on a boat or warship) may be nominated for the award arising from combat action in which all participated.

A military member does not automatically qualify for the Combat Action Ribbon. The CAR is awarded after the service member's command takes into consideration the evidence and specified criteria. The evidence must show a service member was engaged in direct combat, not indirect or in an area where combat is occurring; mere presence in a designated combat zone does not qualify a service member for the award.

Only one Combat Action Ribbon is awarded to a service member per theater of war. The CAR is a positive assessment of a service member's battle effectiveness during a combat engagement within a specific theater of war and is not awarded for additional combat interactions therein.

A military member who serves in special operations, who by the nature of their mission, are restricted in their ability to return fire, and who are operating in conditions where the risk of enemy fire was great and expected to be encountered, may be eligible for the Combat Action Ribbon.

The Combat Action Ribbon is a ribbon-only decoration in contrast to military branches that award a badge or medal. Compare: the U.S. Army awards the Combat Infantryman Badge, Combat Action Badge, or Combat Medical Badge. U.S. Air Force and U.S. Space Force combat participant is awarded the Air Force Combat Action Medal (AFCAM), which includes both full and miniature size suspension medals and a ribbon.

The Combat Action Ribbon is worn in order of precedence on a member's "ribbon rack" displayed on the left (or right) side of a service member's uniform. The outermost blue stripe is always to the wearer's center, with the central colors in order of red, white, and blue (left to right when worn on left side of uniform; right to left when worn on right side of uniform); only one Combat Action Ribbon is authorized for wear, with each additional CAR award signified with a 5/16 inch gold or silver star device attached to the center of the ribbon. For example, two CAR awards are signified with the CAR and the addition of one gold star device. Three awards are signified with the ribbon and two gold star devices.

In full dress uniform medals are worn on the member's left side. The CAR is therefore worn on the right side of the uniform. The CAR is the highest rated ribbon-only award in the U.S. military decorations order of precedence and is superseded only by medals of meritorious achievement and combat valor.

An individual whose eligibility has been established in combat in any of the following listed operations may be authorized award of the Combat Action Ribbon. Only one award per operation is authorized. This listing is not all-inclusive, as the Combat Action Ribbon has been awarded in minor operations, as well as for specific actions.

1. Southeast Asia: 1 March 1961 to 15 August 1973.
2. Dominican Republic: 28 April 1965 to 21 September 1966.
3. USS Liberty (AGTR-5): 8 June 1967 to 9 June 1967.
4. USS Pueblo (AGER-2): 23 January 1968.
5. Operation Frequent Wind (Saigon evacuation): 29 to 30 Apr 1975. (no ships qualified)
6. Operation Mayaguez: 15 May 1975. (no ships qualified)
7. Grenada: 24 October 1983 to 2 November 1983. (no ships qualified)
8. Lebanon: 20 August 1982 to 1 August 1984. (no ships qualified)
9. Persian Gulf
  1. COMNAVSPECWAR Task Unit Tango: 22 September 87.
  2. USS Samuel B. Roberts (FFG-58): 14 April 1988.
  3. Operation Praying Mantis: 18 April 1988.
    - SAG BRAVO
    - COMDESRON NINE STAFF
    - USS Merrill (DD-976)
    - HSL-35 DET 1
    - USS Lynde McCormick (DDG-8)
    - USS Trenton (LPD-14)
    - CONTINGENCY MAGTF 2-88
    - HSL-44, DET 5
    - SAG CHARLIE
    - USS Wainwright (CG-28)
    - USS Bagley (FF-1069)
    - HSL-35, DET 7
    - USS Simpson (FFG-56)
    - HSL-42, DET 10
    - COMMANDER, NAVAL SPECIAL WARFARE TASK
    - GROUP MIDDLE EAST FORCE
    - SEAL TEAM TWO, THIRD PLATOON
    - SAG DELTA
    - COMDESRON TWENTY-TWO
    - USS Jack Williams (FFG-24)
    - HSL-32, DET 2
    - USS Joseph Strauss (DDG-16)
    - USS O'Brien (DD-975)
    - HSL-33, DET 2
    - CO, SPEC BOAT UNIT TWELVE
    - SEAL TEAM 5, PLATOON C
    1. USS Gary (FFG-51)
  4. USS Elmer Montgomery (FF-1082) and USS Vincennes (CG-49): 3 July 1988.
  5. Persian Gulf MCM Operations: Specific units during the periods 19 November 1987 to 1 April 1988; 14 to 20 April 1988; 20 to 23 April 1988; and 2 August 1990 to 10 September 1991.
  6. HM-14 Persian Gulf MCM Operations: 2 August 1990 to 10 September 1991
10. Operation Just Cause (Panama) : 20 December 1989 to 31 January 1990. (no ships qualified)
11. Operation Sharp Edge: 5 to 24 August 1990. (no ships qualified)
12. Operation Desert Storm: 17 January 91 to 28 February 91.
  1. The Secretary of the Navy approved the CAR as an exception to policy for the following ships that operated north of 28.30N.and west of 49.303 from 17 January 1991 to 28 February 1991
    - USS Adroit (MSO-509)
    - USS Beaufort (ATS-2)
    - USS Caron (DD-970)
    - USS Durham (LKA-114)
    - USS Ford (FFG-54)
    - USS Paul F. Foster (DD-964)
    - USNS Hassayampa (T-AO-145)
    - USS Impervious (AM-449)
    - USS Avenger (MCM-1)
    - USS Bunker Hill (CG-52)
    - USS Curts (FFG-38)
    - USS Fife (DD-991)
    - USS Fort McHenry (LSD-43)
    - USS Hawes (FFG-53)
    - USS Horne (CG-30)
    - USS Jarrett (FFG-33)
    - USS Kidd (DDG-993)
    - USS Leader (MSO-490)
    - USS Macdonough (DDG-39)
    - USS Missouri (BB-63)
    - USS Nassau (LHA-4)
    - USS Nicholas (FFG-47)
    - USS Oldendorf (DD-972)
    - USS Portland (LSD-37)
    - USS Raleigh (LPD-1)
    - USS Vreeland (FF-1068)
    - USS Worden (CG-18)
    - USS La Salle (AGF-3)
    - USS Leftwich (DD-984)
    - USS McInerney (FFG-8)
    - USS Mobile Bay (CG-53)
    - USS Niagara Falls (AFS-3)
    - USS Okinawa (LPH-3)
    - USNS Passumpsic (T-A0-107)
    - USS Princeton (CG-59) (hit by mine)
    - USS Tripoli (LPH-10) (hit by mine)
    - HM-14 Vanguard Detachment
    - USS Wisconsin (BB-64)
  2. The following ships were approved for the dates indicated
    - USNS Comfort (T-AH-20) 26 February 1991
    - USS Guam (LPH-9): 25 to 26 February 1991
    - USS Iwo Jima (LPH-2): 26 February 1991
    - USS Ogden (LPD-5): 25 to 26 February 1991
    - USS Missouri (BB-63): 12 February 1991 and 25 February 1991
    - VC-6 Detachment
    - EODMU Detachments
    - USS Richmond K. Turner (CG-20): 19 to 24 February 1991
    - USS Valley Forge (CG-50): 16 to 28 February 1991
    - USS Leader (MSO-490): 23 March 1991
13. El Salvador: 1 January 1981 to 1 February 1992.
14. Operation Restore Hope (i.e. Somalia humanitarian relief): 5 December 1992 to 31 March 1995. (no ships qualified)
15. Cambodian postwar transition: 1 June 1992 to 15 November 1993.
16. Operation Assured Response (Monrovia, Liberia) : 7 to 18 April 1996. (no ships qualified)
17. Kosovo Campaign: 24 March 1999 to 27 January 2000.
18. War in Afghanistan: 11 September 2001 to 28 December 2014.
19. Iraq War: 19 March 2003 to 18 December 2011.
  - USS Ardent (MCM-12)
  - USS Dextrous (MCM-13)
  - USS Chinook (PC-9)
20. Operation Prosperity Guardian: December 2023 - May 2025
  - USS Mason (DDG-87)
  - USS Stockdale (DDG-106)
  - USS Carney (DDG-64)
  - USS Gravely (DDG-107)
  - USS Thomas Hudner (DDG-116)
  - USS Laboon (DDG-58)
  - USS Philippine Sea (CG-58)
  - USS Dwight D. Eisenhower (CVN-69)
  - USS Cole (DDG-67)
  - USS Bataan (LHD-5)
  - USS Carter Hall (LSD-50)
21. Operation Rough Rider: March – May 2025
  - USS Harry S. Truman (CVN-75)
  - USS Stout (DDG-55)
  - USS Jason Dunham (DDG-109)
  - USS Gravely (DDG-107)
  - USS Cole (DDG-67)
  - USS Gettysburg (CG-64)
  - USS Carl Vinson (CVN-70)
  - USS Sterett (DDG-104)

== Variants ==
The Combat Action Ribbon is currently authorized with a U.S. Navy/Marine Corps design, and as of 2008, a U.S. Coast Guard version.

The Navy CAR covers the Navy and Marine Corps since the establishment of the CAR in 1969. Additionally, the award was made retroactive to 7 December 1941.

Prior to 2008, eligible U.S. Coast Guardsmen were awarded the Navy Combat Action Ribbon (because in most conflicts and wars Coast Guard members usually operated with or under the U.S. Navy). From 2009 forward, Coast Guard members who engage in combat are now awarded the Coast Guard Combat Action Ribbon.

== Award inquiries ==
Navy, Marine Corps, and Coast Guard veterans are advised to submit requests about eligibility or other matters to their respective branches to inquire about the Combat Action Ribbon or other awards of this nature.

== Navy CAR ==
Combat Action Ribbon with one gold star device, denoting awards in two separate theaters of war.

The Navy's Combat Action Ribbon ("CAR") was established during the Vietnam War by a Secretary of the Navy Notice, dated February 17, 1969, with retroactive award to 1 March 1961. The Navy CAR is awarded to members of the Navy and Marine Corps (and Coast Guard, when operating under the control of the Navy during a war or national emergency), with the grade of captain/colonel and below, who have actively participated in ground or surface combat.

Marines, Navy sailors, or Coast Guardsmen who are awarded the Combat Infantryman Badge, Combat Medical Badge, Combat Action Badge, or Combat Action Medal while assigned to United States Army, United States Air Force, and United States Space Force units, or who earned such for prior service in the U.S. Army, Air Force, or Space Force, may be authorized to wear the Combat Action Ribbon upon application to the Department of the Navy (or Department of Homeland Security, as applicable).

After the destroyer USS Cole was attacked by suicide bombers in 2000, the entire crew of the ship was awarded the Combat Action Ribbon a year later.

In January 2013, the awarding criteria were expanded to include dangerous exposure to IEDs, mines, and scatterable munitions, be it the detonation of such or direct action taken to disable, render safe, or destroy such; servicemembers may be deemed eligible if the IEDs are detonated or specifically emplaced by the enemy. Previous eligibility applied only to exposure to IEDs actually detonated by the enemy. Eligibility under this criterion is retroactive only to 7 October 2001.

Blanket lists of units and operations whose members or participants are deemed to be "in-combat", and thus potentially eligible, can be found in OPNAVNOTE 1650 (for specific units and ships) and in chapter 2, appendix E, of recent SECNAVINSTs (for specific operations and ships) though, "Neither service in a combat area nor being awarded the Purple Heart Medal automatically makes a service member eligible", and specific sailors and marines may receive the ribbon in recognition of individual actions or various minor operations.

In 2017, sailors from USS Nitze, USS Mason, USS Ponce, and USS San Antonio were awarded the Combat Action Ribbon after their ships were fired upon by rebels off the coast of Yemen in 2016, one of the few instances in the 21st century when U.S. Navy sailors aboard a commissioned warship were awarded the ribbon for combat occurring at sea. In 2005, the crew of the USS Kearsarge were awarded the CAR as well.

In 2024, sailors from the destroyers USS Carney, USS Mason, USS Gravely, USS Laboon, USS Thomas Hudner, USS Cole, Cruiser USS Philippine Sea, Carrier USS Dwight D. Eisenhower, amphibious assault ship USS Bataan (LHD-5), and dock landing ship USS Carter Hall were awarded the Combat Action Ribbon after their ships were fired upon by Houthi rebels during the 2024 missile strikes in Yemen and shooting down drones in the Red Sea for the time period of October 2023 to April 2024.

While transiting the Red Sea from September 25–27, 2024 USS Indianapolis (LCS-17), USS Spruance (DDG-111), and USS Stockdale (DDG-106) successfully detected and engaged 23 ballistic and anti-ship cruise missiles and one way attack drones fired from Houthi rebels in Yemen. Indianapolis became the first Littoral combat ship in history to engage in combat.

USS Oscar Austin earned the Combat Action ribbon for providing combat support in the Red Sea against the Houthis in conjunction with the USS Carl Vinson Carrier Strike Group in the Gulf of Aden which also included USS Sterett and USS Princeton.

== World War II and Korean War ==
In October 1999, World War II and Korean War veterans became retroactively eligible for the Navy Combat Action Ribbon by Public Law 106-65 on 5 October 1999, which permitted the Secretary of the Navy (SECNAV) to award the Combat Action Ribbon to a member of the Navy or Marine Corps for participation in ground or surface combat during any period on or after 7 December 1941, and before 1 March 1961, if the Secretary determines that the member has not been previously recognized in an appropriate manner for such participation. Two specific blocks of time were later designated by then SECNAV Danzig: Dec. 7, 1941 – Apr. 14, 1946 (World War II), and June 25, 1950 – July 27, 1954 (Korean War)

== Coast Guard CAR ==
In 2009, the U.S. Coast Guard began awarding a Coast Guard Combat Action Ribbon (CGCAR), that is stylized similarly in design to the Navy Combat Action Ribbon.

Prior to 2008 Coast Guard members awarded the Combat Action Ribbon received the U.S. Navy CAR because in times of conflict and war the Coast Guard in combat areas typically operated with or under the U.S. Navy. For example, in the Vietnam War's Operation Market Time the U.S. Coast Guard had at any one time approximately 1,200 Coast Guard members participating in brown water navy riverine warfare operations. Those Coast Guard members were awarded the U.S. Navy Combat Action Ribbon by the Commander U.S. Naval Forces Vietnam.

The U.S. Coast Guard Combat Action Ribbon (CGCAR) was established by the approval of the Secretary of Homeland Security on 16 July 2008, in ALCOAST 361/08. The CGCAR is awarded to members who have actively participated in ground or maritime combat. Satisfactory performance under fire with the enemy is required.

From 2009 forward U.S. Coast Guard members will receive the CGCAR regardless if a member is operating in conjunction with or under the control of the U.S. Navy. Those USCG members awarded the U.S. Navy CAR prior to 2009 are authorized to continue wearing the Navy award, or at the member's option can choose to wear the CGCAR.

Eligibility for the CGCAR also includes personnel having direct exposure to the detonation of an enemy's improvised explosive device, and to personnel who served in clandestine/special operations and were restricted in their ability to return fire, where the risk of enemy fire was great.

The Coast Guard Combat Action Ribbon is authorized for:

- Operation Allied Force (Kosovo)
- Operation Desert Storm
- Operation Enduring Freedom
- Operation Iraqi Freedom

Other minor operations and specific actions may allow the award, as determined by the Commandant of the Coast Guard. Only one award per operation is authorized.

Initially, all other similar military awards from other services were required to be converted to the Coast Guard Combat Action Ribbon in order to be worn on the Coast Guard uniform, but the policy was modified effective January 1, 2009 to allow wearing the Navy Combat Action Ribbon, Air Force Combat Action Medal, and Army Combat Infantry/Medical/Action Badge for service prior to May 1, 1975, and which cannot be converted to the Coast Guard Combat Action Ribbon.

Additional awards of the Coast Guard Combat Action Ribbon are denoted by 5/16 inch gold stars on the ribbon.
