= USS Sterett =

Four ships of the United States Navy have borne the name USS Sterett in honor of Master Commandant Andrew Sterett (1778–1807), who served during the Quasi-War with France and the Barbary Wars.

- The first USS Sterett (DD-27), a three-stack, modified Paulding-class destroyer (a type of ship often referred to as a "flivver") saw action during World War I.
- The second USS Sterett (DD-407), a Benham-class destroyer, saw action during World War II.
- The third USS Sterett (CG-31), a Belknap-class guided missile cruiser, saw action in the Vietnam War and the Cold War.
- The fourth USS Sterett (DDG-104) an Arleigh Burke-class destroyer commissioned on 9 August 2008.
