= USS Leader (MSO-490) =

Minesweeper of the United States Navy

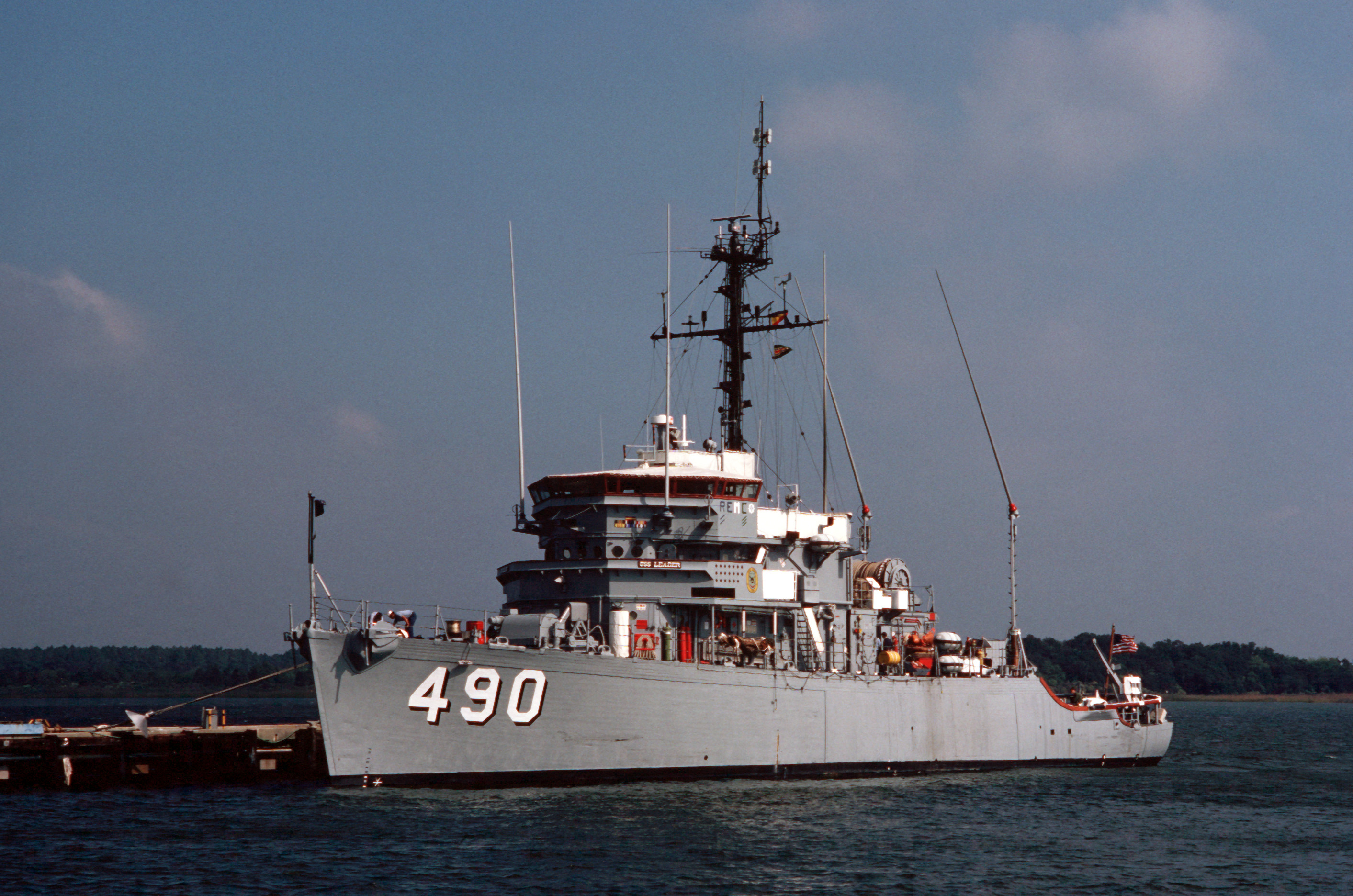
- USS Leader (MSO-490) docked on 1 October 1984

History

United States
- Builder: J. M. Martinac Shipbuilding Corp., Tacoma, Washington
- Laid down: 22 September 1953
- Launched: 15 September 1954
- Commissioned: 16 November 1955
- Decommissioned: 12 December 1991
- Reclassified: MSO-490 7 February 1955
- Stricken: 18 March 1992
- Home port: Long Beach, California
- Fate: Scrapped, 1994

General characteristics
- Class & type: Agile class minesweeper
- Displacement: 775 tons (full load)
- Length: 172 ft (52.43 m)
- Beam: 36 ft (10.97 m)
- Draft: 10 ft (3.05 m)
- Propulsion: 4 × aluminum block Waukesha diesel engines, 2,400 bhp (1,790 kW); 2 × shafts; 2 × controllable pitch propellers
- Speed: 15 knots (28 km/h)
- Complement: 74
- Armament: one 40 mm mount

USS Leader (AM-490/MSO-490) was an Agile-class minesweeper acquired by the U.S. Navy for the task of removing mines that had been placed in the water to prevent the safe passage of ships.

Leader (AM-490) was laid down by J. M. Martinac Shipbuilding Corp., Tacoma, Washington, 22 September 1953; launched 15 September 1954; sponsored by Mrs. Norman Wordlund; reclassified MSO-490 7 February 1955, and commissioned 16 November 1955. This MSO class of minesweeper was constructed of non-magnetic materials, including a wooden hull and aluminum engines, and had a degaussing system to reduce the magnetic field of the vessel, so that it could move over magnetic mines without detonating them. It was equipped with a "magnetic tail", two thick cables spooled on a large reel aft of the superstructure. The power-generation system could send current through this split tail after it was streamed behind the ship, creating a magnetic field designed to set off magnetic mines after the ship passed over them. It carried conventional mine-sweeping gear as well.

== Pacific Ocean operations ==
After shakedown, Leader joined Mine Squadron 9 at Long Beach, California, 21 December. During 1956, she performed mine evaluation exercises and tactical training until 1 October when she departed on her first WestPac cruise. Arriving Yokosuka 30 October, she operated with the U.S. 7th Fleet for the next 5 months performing mine warfare exercises in the Far East. Returning home 12 April 1957, the minesweeper resumed mine evaluation tests along the U.S. West Coast; and she continued these operations for the next 2 years.

== Cambodia and Vietnam operations ==
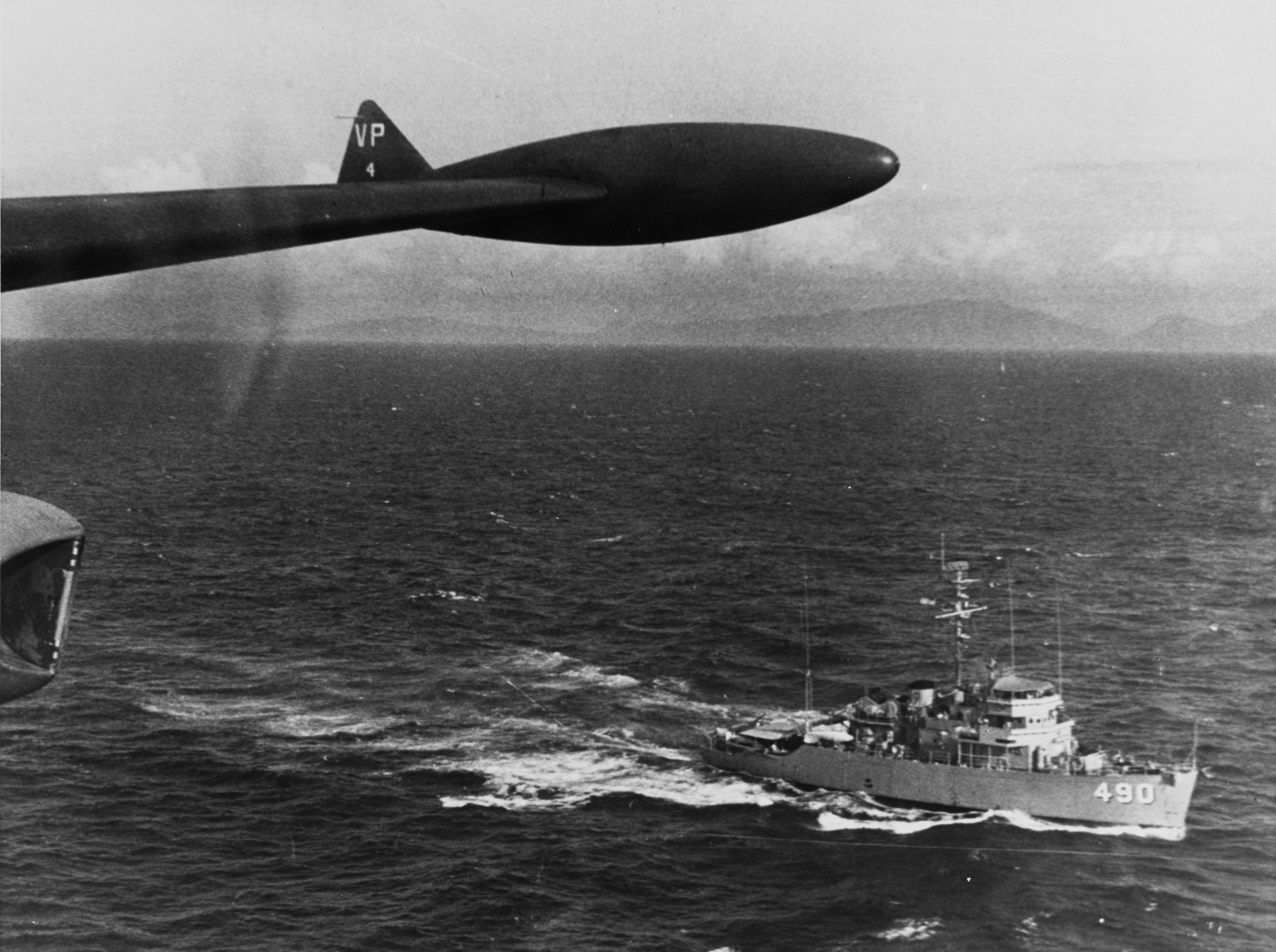
Leader off Vietnam in 1965.

From 1959 through 1968 Leader alternated six WestPac cruises with U.S. West Coast mine warfare and mine countermeasure exercises. During her 1961 cruise. Leader became the first warship ever to visit the Cambodian capital of Phnom Penh when she completed the 180-mile transit up the Mekong River on 27 August, under the command of Lt. Commander Frank Kauzlarich. On this same cruise she directed South Vietnamese units in minesweep training operations. During her tour with the U.S. 7th Fleet in 1965, Leader again operated off South Vietnam, this time under more serious circumstances. From June to August she performed special minesweeping operations and played a major role in the expanded American effort to assist the courageous people of Vietnam in their fight against Communist aggressors. Her tour completed, Leader returned to Long Beach 14 December to resume training operations.

== Market Time operations ==
1966 saw an extensive overhaul for the minesweeper, from 9 May to 30 September. After further training and readying for deployment, Leader once again sailed for WestPac 6 January 1967. She participated in Market Time operations for the better part of her tour, returning to Long Beach 18 November. She operated locally through the first half of 1968. Then, on 12 August, Leader departed Long Beach for another extensive deployment, and continued operating off Vietnam into 1969.

== Persian Gulf War service ==
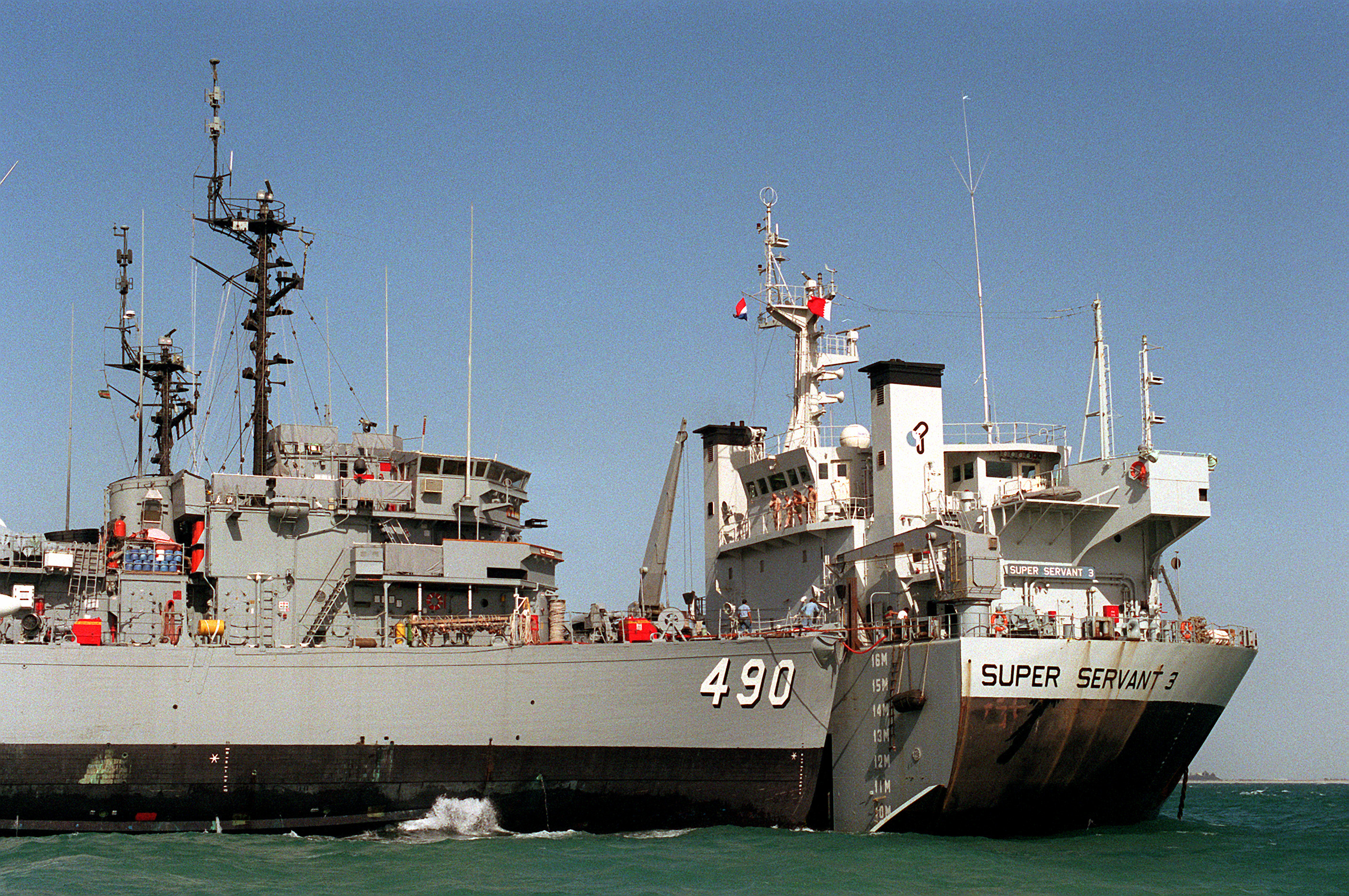
USS Leader (MSO-490) aboard Super Servant 3.

Leader was lifted to the Persian gulf following Iraq's invasion of Kuwait. She was loaded aboard the Dutch heavy lift ship Super Servant 3 on 19 August 1990 at Norfolk along with USS Impervious (MSO-449), USS Adroit (MSO-509) and USS Avenger (MCM-1). She was offloaded 5 October 1990 in the middle east. Impervious returned to Norfolk on 14 November 1991 with USS Impervious (MSO-449) and USS Adroit (MSO-509) aboard Super Servant 4. She participated in minesweeping operations to clear mines for anticipated d-day style landing by US Marines as part of the diversionary force which allowed land forces to take Iraqi Artillery positions from behind. On 28 February 1991 at 0500 they were ordered to storm the beaches at 0300 they were ordered to stand down as Iraq had surrendered and the war was over. She also did escort duty for the battleships USS Missouri and USS Wisconsin. as part of two naval battle groups built around the aircraft carriers USS Dwight D. Eisenhower and USS Independence to the Gulf, where they were ready by 8 August. She did riggings for HM-14 Airborne Mine Countermeasures minesweeping helicopters stationed aboard the USS Tripoli. This was the minesweeping gear use to clear anchored mines such as the one that hit Tripoli. Tripoli proceeded into the northern Persian Gulf and assumed duties as flagship for Airborne Mine Countermeasures operations there with HM-14 deployed aboard. On the morning of 18 February 1991, at 0436 (4:36 a.m.) Tripoli was rocked by a mine explosion on her starboard bow. The explosion ripped a 16 by 20 ft hole in the ship's hull and injured four sailors. The Tripoli was towed off of three other unexploded mines by two MCM ships. After 20 hours of damage control, the ship was stabilized and was actually ready to resume operations. However, her HM-14 fuel tanks were damaged by the mine hit, and she was unable to deploy her HM-14s due to a lack of fuel. The Impervious and sister MSOs were her escorts. USS Impervious was responsible for removing these mines that threatened the Tripoli. Soon after the Iraqi invasion, it became clear that Iraq was laying mines in international waters. U.S. ships discovered and destroyed six mines during December. The U.S. Mine Countermeasures Group (USMCMG) was established with the objective of clearing a path to the beach for a possible amphibious landing and battleship gunfire support.

The minesweepers USS Adroit (MSO 509), USS Impervious (MSO 449), and USS Leader (MSO 490) along with the newly commissioned mine countermeasures ship USS Avenger (MCM 1 ) arrived in the Gulf aboard the heavy-lift ship Super Servant III. More than 20 Navy explosive ordnance disposal (EOD) teams were also deployed to support the mine countermeasures force. Allied minesweepers from Saudi Arabia, Great Britain and Kuwait, and the MH-53 Super Stallions of Mine Countermeasures Helicopter Squadron 14 joined the MCM effort.

After months of training off Dubai, United Arab Emirates, USMCMG staff embarked in USS Tripoli (LPH 10) on 20 January, and proceeded to the northern Gulf waters to perform their mission. As flagship for the combined operation, Tripoli's flight deck was the base for the mine-sweeping helicopters. Six British minesweepers joined their U.S. counterparts, with British and U.S. warships providing air defense.

USMCMG began its work 60 miles east of the Kuwaiti coastline, working initially to clear a 15-mile-long, 1,000-yard-wide path. The mine-clearing task force spent the first few weeks of DESERT STORM pushing 24 miles to "Point FOXTROT," a 10-mile by 3.5-mile box which became the battleship gunfire support area south of Faylaka Island.

While sweeping further toward shore, the task group was targeted by Iraqi fire control radars associated with Silkworm missile sites inside Kuwait. Task force ships moved out of Silkworm range and worked to locate the radar site. During those maneuvers on 18 February, Iraqi mines found their mark. Within three hours of each other, Tripoli and USS Princeton (CG 59) were rocked by exploding mines. As damage control teams successfully overcame fires and flooding aboard Tripoli and Princeton, Impervious, Leader and Avenger searched for additional mines in the area. Adroit led the salvage tug USS Beaufort (ATS 2) toward Princeton to tow her to safety.

Tripoli was able to continue her mission for several days before she was relieved by USS La Salle (AGF 3) and USS New Orleans (LPH 11) and proceeded to Bahrain for repairs. New Orleans provided the helicopter deck while the mine group staff moved aboard La Salle to coordinate the operation. Princeton restored her TLAM strike and AEGIS anti-air warfare defense capabilities within fifteen minutes of the mine strike, whereupon she reassumed duties as local anti-air warfare coordinator and remained on station, providing defense for the mine countermeasures group for an additional 30 hours, until relieved.

Charts and intelligence captured from Iraq showed the mine field where Tripoli and Princeton were hit was one of six laid in a 150-mile arc from Faylaka Island to the Saudi-Kuwaiti border. Within that arc, there were four additional mine-lines—a total of more than 1,000 mines—laid over a five-month period.

Three days later, the massive 31-ship amphibious task force moved north to assist in battlefield preparation as the deadline for the ground offensive neared. As Wisconsin and Missouri steamed in the vicinity of recently cleared "Point FOXTROT," their gun crews continued to pound Iraqi targets. Marine AV-8B Harriers launched from the flight deck of Nassau conducted strikes ashore.

Leader was decommissioned on 12 December 1991 and was struck from the Navy list on 18 March 1992. She was sold for scrapping in 1994.
