= USS Princeton =

USS Princeton may refer to:

- USS Princeton (1843), a screw sloop, launched and commissioned in 1843, the first screw-driven vessel in the Navy and the subject of a fatal gun explosion in 1844
- USS Princeton (1851), a transport and training ship, launched in 1851 and commissioned in 1852
- USS Princeton (PG-13), a gunboat launched in 1897 and commissioned in 1898
- USS Princeton (CVL-23), a light aircraft carrier, commissioned in 1943, sunk at Leyte Gulf in 1944
- USS Princeton (CV-37), an aircraft carrier commissioned in 1945, serving in the Korean War and Vietnam War, reclassified LPH-5 in 1959, decommissioned 1970
- USS Princeton (CG-59), a guided missile cruiser commissioned in 1989, currently in active service
