= USS Princeton (CG-59) =

Ticonderoga-class cruiser

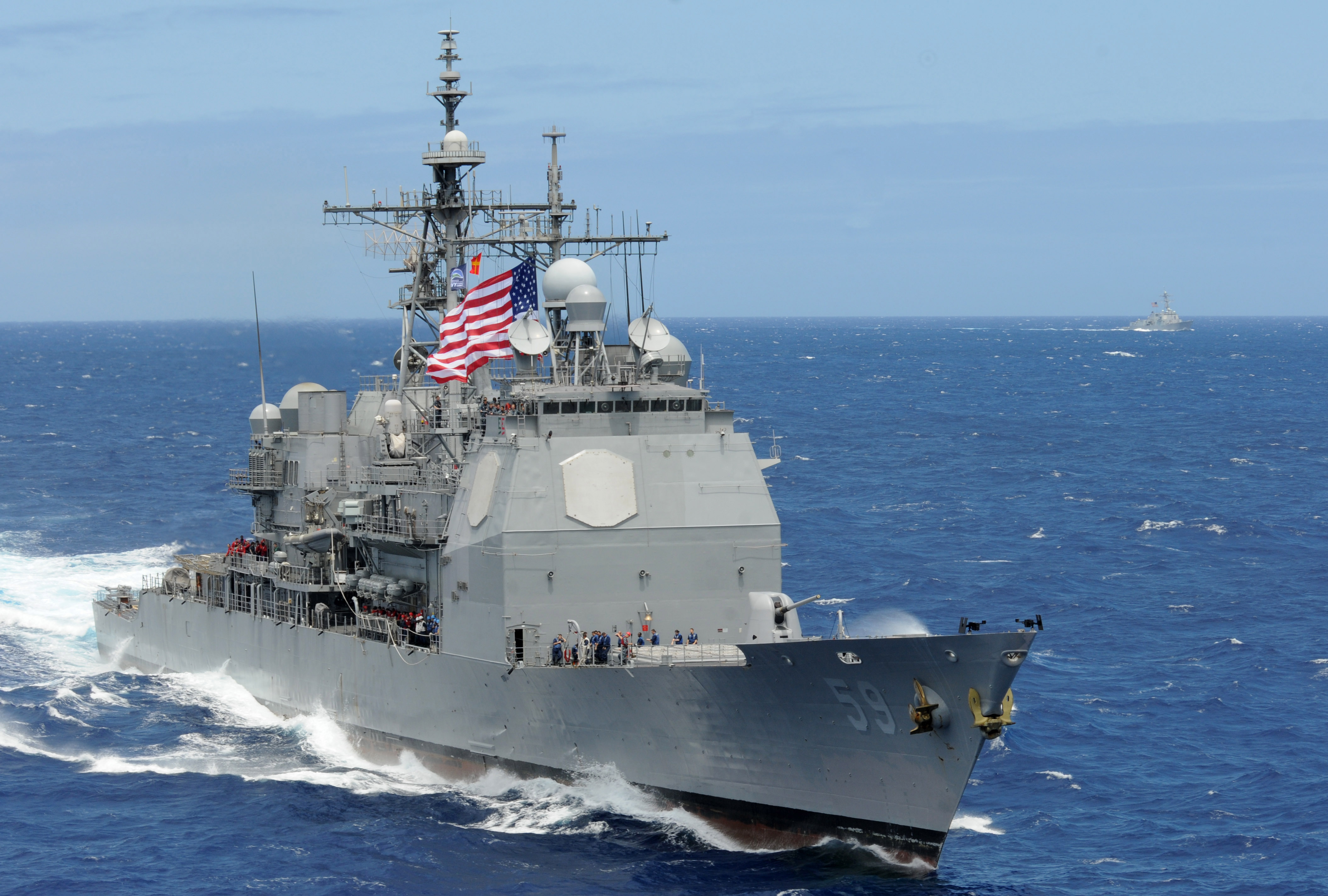
- USS Princeton (CG-59)

History

United States
- Name: Princeton
- Namesake: Battle of Princeton
- Ordered: 16 December 1983
- Builder: Ingalls Shipbuilding
- Laid down: 15 October 1986
- Launched: 2 October 1987
- Commissioned: 11 February 1989
- Home port: San Diego
- Identification: MMSI number: 338824000; Call sign: NDIH; Hull number: CG-59
- Motto: Honor and Glory
- Status: in active service
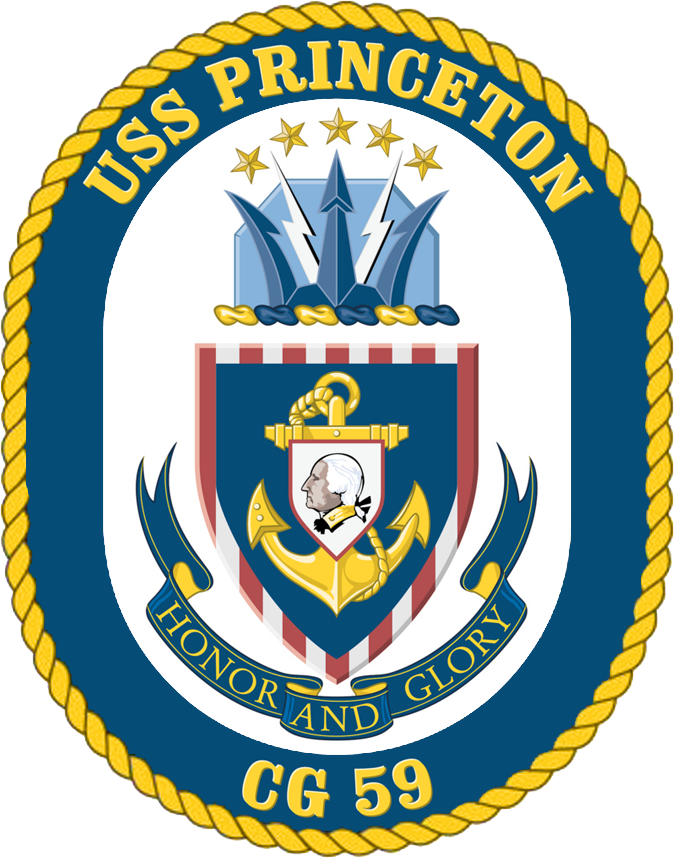
- Badge

General characteristics
- Class & type: Ticonderoga-class cruiser
- Displacement: Approx. 9,600 long tons (9,800 t) full load
- Length: 567 feet (173 m)
- Beam: 55 feet (16.8 meters)
- Draft: 34 feet (10.2 meters)
- Propulsion: 4 × General Electric LM2500 gas turbine engines; 2 × controllable-reversible pitch propellers; 2 × rudders
- Speed: 32.5 knots (60 km/h; 37.4 mph)
- Complement: 30 officers and 300 enlisted
- Sensors & processing systems: AN/SPY-1A/B multi-function radar; AN/SPS-49 air search radar (Removed on some ships); AN/SPG-62 fire control radar; AN/SPS-73 surface search radar; AN/SPQ-9 gun fire control radar; AN/SQQ-89(V)1/3 - A(V)15 Sonar suite, consisting of: AN/SQS-53B/C/D active sonar; AN/SQR-19 TACTAS, AN/SQR-19B ITASS, & MFTA passive sonar; AN/SQQ-28 light airborne multi-purpose system
- Armament: 2 × 61 cell Mk 41 vertical launch systems containing; 122 × mix of: RIM-66M-5 Standard SM-2MR Block IIIB; RIM-156A SM-2ER Block IV; RIM-161 SM-3; RIM-162A ESSM; RIM-174A Standard ERAM; BGM-109 Tomahawk; RUM-139A VL-ASROC; 8 × RGM-84 Harpoon missiles; 2 × 5 in (127 mm)/62 caliber Mark 45 Mod 4 lightweight gun; 2 × Mk 38 25 mm Machine Gun Systems; 2–4 × .50 in (12.7 mm) cal. machine gun; 2 × Phalanx CIWS Block 1B; 2 × Mk 32 12.75 in (324 mm) triple torpedo tubes
- Aircraft carried: 2 × MH-60R Seahawk LAMPS Mk III helicopters.

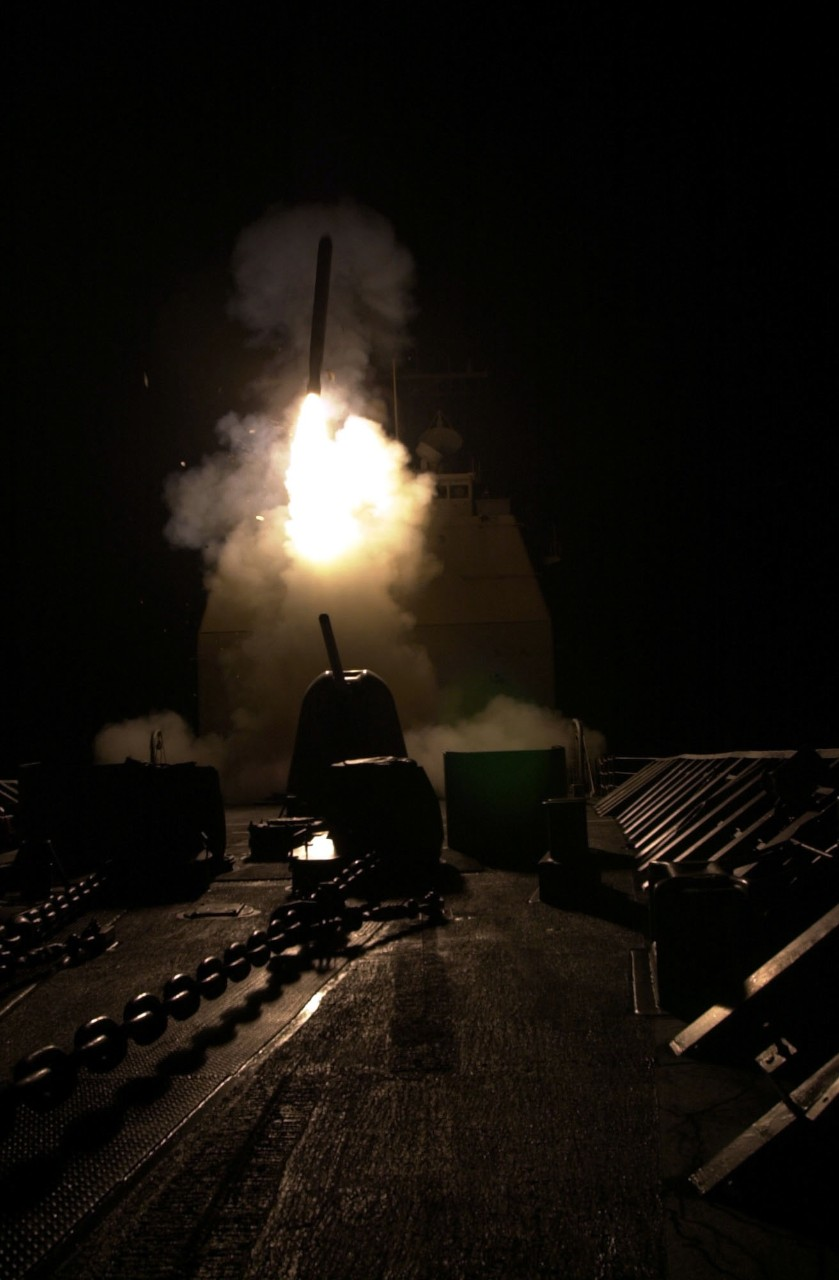
USS Princeton CG-59 Tomahawk Shot 10 Oct 2001

USS Princeton (CG-59) is a Ticonderoga-class guided missile cruiser serving in the United States Navy. Armed with naval guns and anti-air, anti-surface, and anti-submarine missiles, plus other weapons, she is equipped for surface-to-air, surface-to-surface, and anti-submarine warfare. She was previously home to two SH-60B LAMPS Mk III Seahawk helicopters and now carries a pair of the MH-60R version of the Seahawk. This warship is named for the Revolutionary War victories over the British by George Washington in and around the town of Princeton, New Jersey. She is the oldest Ticonderoga-class cruiser still in active commissioned service as of 2026.

Princeton was the first Ticonderoga-class cruiser to carry the upgraded AN/SPY-1B radar system.

== Operational history ==
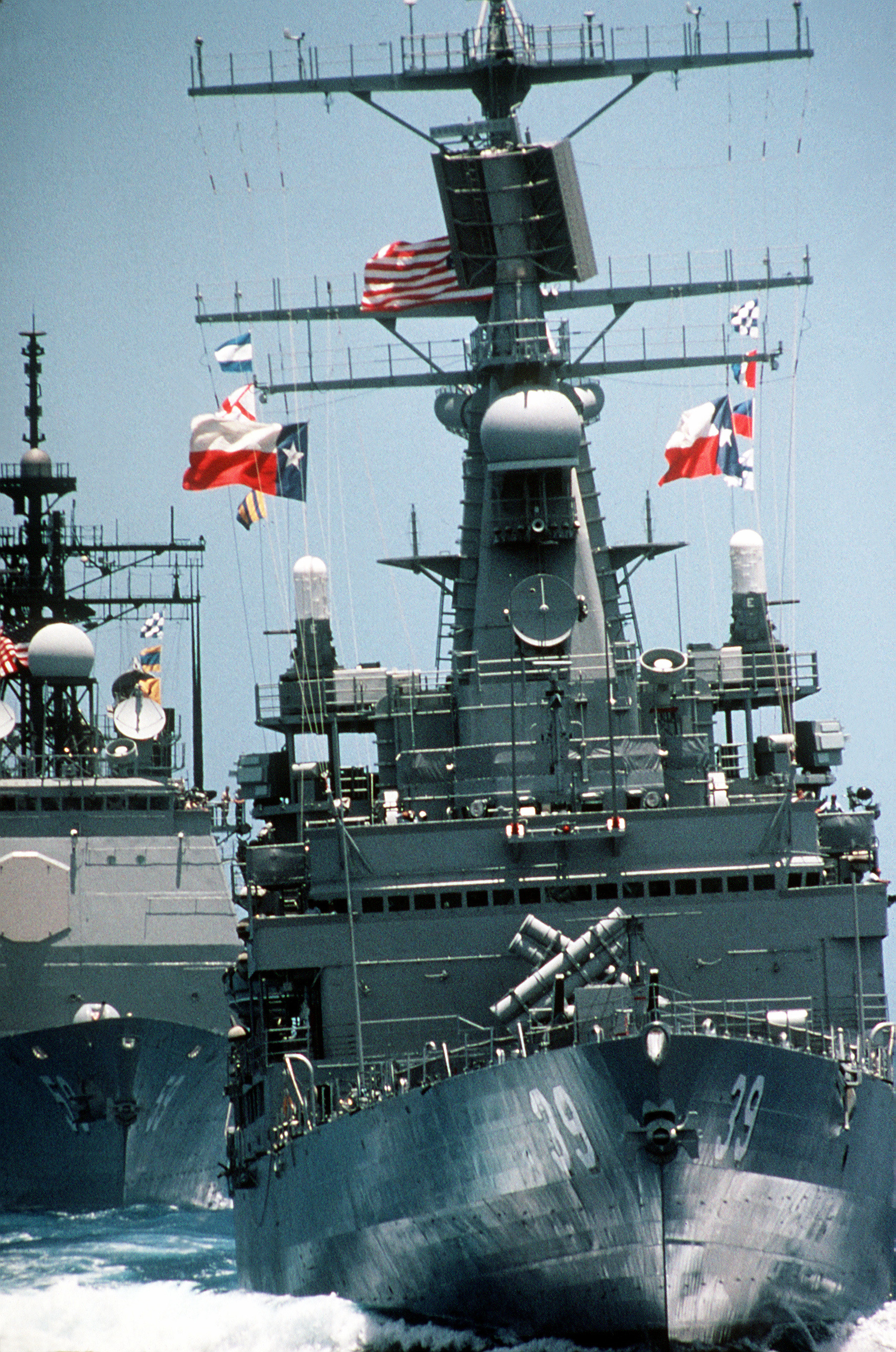
USS Princeton follows Texas during the RimPac '90 multinational exercise.

The ship was commissioned on 11 February 1989 in the Ingalls shipyard in Pascagoula, Mississippi. After traveling through the Panama Canal, Princeton was home-ported at the Long Beach Naval Station, California.

=== Vladivostok port visit ===
In 1990, Princeton served as the flagship for the first US Navy visit to the Soviet Union's Pacific port of Vladivostok since before World War II. She sailed with Reuben James. Before the visit was completed, the crew received word that their Pacific cruise was canceled. They returned to Long Beach and joined the Ranger Battle Group preparing to deploy to the Persian Gulf.

=== Mine strike ===
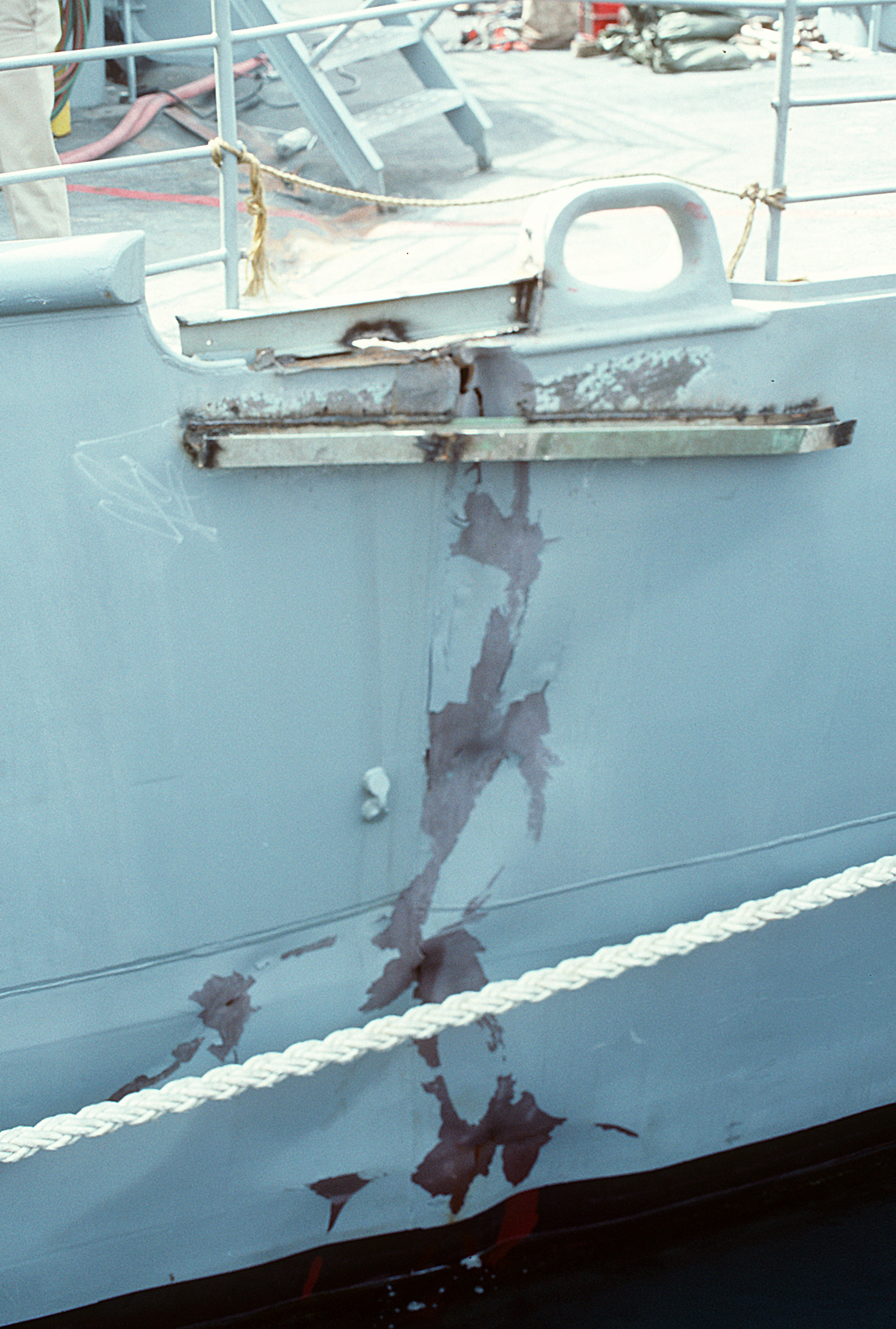
A hull crack caused by the mine that detonated underneath Princeton.

On the morning of 18 February 1991, during Operation Desert Storm, Princeton was patrolling 28 nautical miles (52 km) off Failaka Island in the Persian Gulf, on the west side of the decoy United States Marine Corps and naval invasion forces afloat. At exactly 7:15 AM local time two Italian-made MN103 Manta bottom-mounted influence mines detonated, one just under the port rudder and the other just forward of the starboard bow, the second explosion most likely being a sympathetic detonation caused by the first. The blasts cracked the superstructure, buckled three lines in the hull, jammed the port rudder, flooded the #3 switchboard room through chilled water pipe cracks, and damaged the starboard propeller shaft. Three crewmembers were injured, one seriously. Despite the severe damage, the forward weapons and the AEGIS combat system were back online within 15 minutes.

At great peril, the Canadian destroyer HMCS Athabaskan moved north through the minefield to deliver damage-control supplies to the severely damaged Princeton, which remained on station for 31 hours until she was relieved. Princeton's commanding officer, Captain Edward Hontz, specifically requested the assistance of Athabaskan despite the latter not originally assigned to the area. Unlike most ships of her size, Athabaskan could simultaneously operate two large CH-124 Sea King helicopters, which could search out mines for long periods. As a gesture of solidarity, the Athabaskan's helicopters winched over seventeen cases of beer for the crew of the Princeton, since United States Navy vessels were dry.

Princeton, which suffered from a locked starboard propeller shaft and a locked port rudder, was guided through the minefield by the minesweeper Adroit. Temporary repairs were conducted first in Bahrain, and then in the port of Jebel Ali near Dubai by the duty destroyer tender Acadia, and finally in a Dubai drydock. After eight weeks, Princeton returned to the United States under the ship's power for additional repairs. The ship and her crew were awarded the Combat Action Ribbon.

Captain Edward Hontz turned over command to Captain J. Cutler Dawson before moving on to command the Aegis Training Command in Dahlgren, Virginia. Future Chief of Naval Operations, Michael M. Gilday was serving aboard Princeton as an officer during the ordeal, and was awarded the Navy Commendation Medal with Valor for his actions.

When the U.S. Naval Base in Long Beach was closed due to BRAC action, the home port of Princeton was moved to Naval Base San Diego.

=== Operation Desert Fox ===
In December 1998, ships of the USS Carl Vinson (CVN 70) Carrier Battle Group and Carrier Air Wing 11 participated in Operation Desert Fox, striking key military targets in Iraq with a combination of attack aircraft and cruise missiles, launched from USS Antietam (CG 54), USS Princeton (CG 59), USS Paul Hamilton (DDG 60) and other Pacific Fleet ships.

Princeton was overhauled from 1999 to 2000 in San Diego, California.

=== Operation Enduring Freedom ===
Following the terrorist attacks on New York and Washington, D.C., on Sept. 11, 2001, Pacific Fleet units again answered the call. On Oct. 7, less than a month after the attack, aircraft from USS Carl Vinson (CVN 70) and surface ships conducted the first strikes on terrorist strongholds in Afghanistan, launching Operation Enduring Freedom. The following year, dozens of Pacific Fleet ships served in the Arabian Sea, including USS Kitty Hawk (CV 63), USS Constellation (CV 64), USS John C. Stennis (CVN 74) and USS Abraham Lincoln (CVN 72).

On the evening of 7 October 2001, cruisers PHILIPPINE SEA (CG-58,) and PRINCETON (CG-59,) destroyers MCFAUL (DDG-74,) JOHN PAUL JONES (DDG-53,) and O’ BRIEN (DD-975,) submarine PROVIDENCE (SSN-719) and British submarines HMS TRIUMPH and HMS TRAFALGAR commenced launching about 50 BGM-109 Tomahawk Land-Attack Missiles (TLAMs) timed to hit targets in Afghanistan at 2100 H-hour. Almost all these missile hit their assigned targets, although one errant missile hit a United Nations facility in Kabul, killing four UN employees. The Taliban would subsequently hyper-inflate claims of collateral damage in an attempt to discredit the accuracy of the U.S. strikes and to generate opposition to U.S. action, particularly in the Islamic world.

In 2003, the ship was assigned to Cruiser Destroyer Group 5 (Nimitz Battle Group)].

=== Princeton aerial object incident ===
While training in the Pacific Ocean, in November 2004 Princeton tracked unidentified flying objects that were capable of accelerating and maneuvering at extraordinary speeds. Princeton subsequently contacted two Navy F/A-18F fighters from Nimitz who tracked and filmed their interactions with the objects. The incident was publicly disclosed in December 2017 with the revelation of the funding of the Advanced Aerospace Threat Identification Program.

=== Hamid rescue ===
On 21 July 2005, Princeton responded to a radio call from an Iranian dhow, named Hamid, that was dead in the water and in need of engineering assistance. A rescue and assistance team was dispatched to Hamid where it was determined that the engine would not start due to corroded batteries that were low on power. The batteries were removed and brought back to Princeton for maintenance, cleaning and recharging. Princeton rescue team restored power onboard Hamid, restarted the engines, and then provided minor medical assistance and fresh water to the dhow's crew.

=== Man overboard incident ===
In 2005, the warship was acting as an escort for Carrier Strike Group Eleven, led by Nimitz, and was featured in the documentary Carrier. While in the Persian Gulf on the night of 12 September 2005, or the early morning of 13 September, during the filming of the documentary, a sailor fell overboard. Despite a search lasting over five days, and covering a 360-square-mile (930 km^{2}) area, the sailor was not found.

=== Magellan Star ===
In September 2010, Princeton was involved in the rescue of the hostages aboard the pirated MV Magellan Star in the Gulf of Aden.

== Awards ==
- Combat Action Ribbon – (Jan-Feb 1991)
- Joint Meritorious Unit Award – (Jan-Dec 1997)
- Navy Unit Commendation – (Jan-Feb 1991, 16-20 Dec 1998, Sep-Dec 2001, Jan-May 2003)
- Navy Meritorious Unit Commendation – (Jul-Nov 2010, Sep-Nov 2013)
- Battle "E" – (1991, 1992, 1993, 1995, 1996, 1999, 2001, 2003, 2008, 2010, 2013)
- Southwest Asia Service Medal – (Jan-Apr 1991)
- Spokane Trophy Award – (2003, 2017)
