= Action of 1 August 1801 =

Naval battle of the First Barbary War

Coordinates: 32.876174°N 13.187507°E

- Part of the First Barbary War
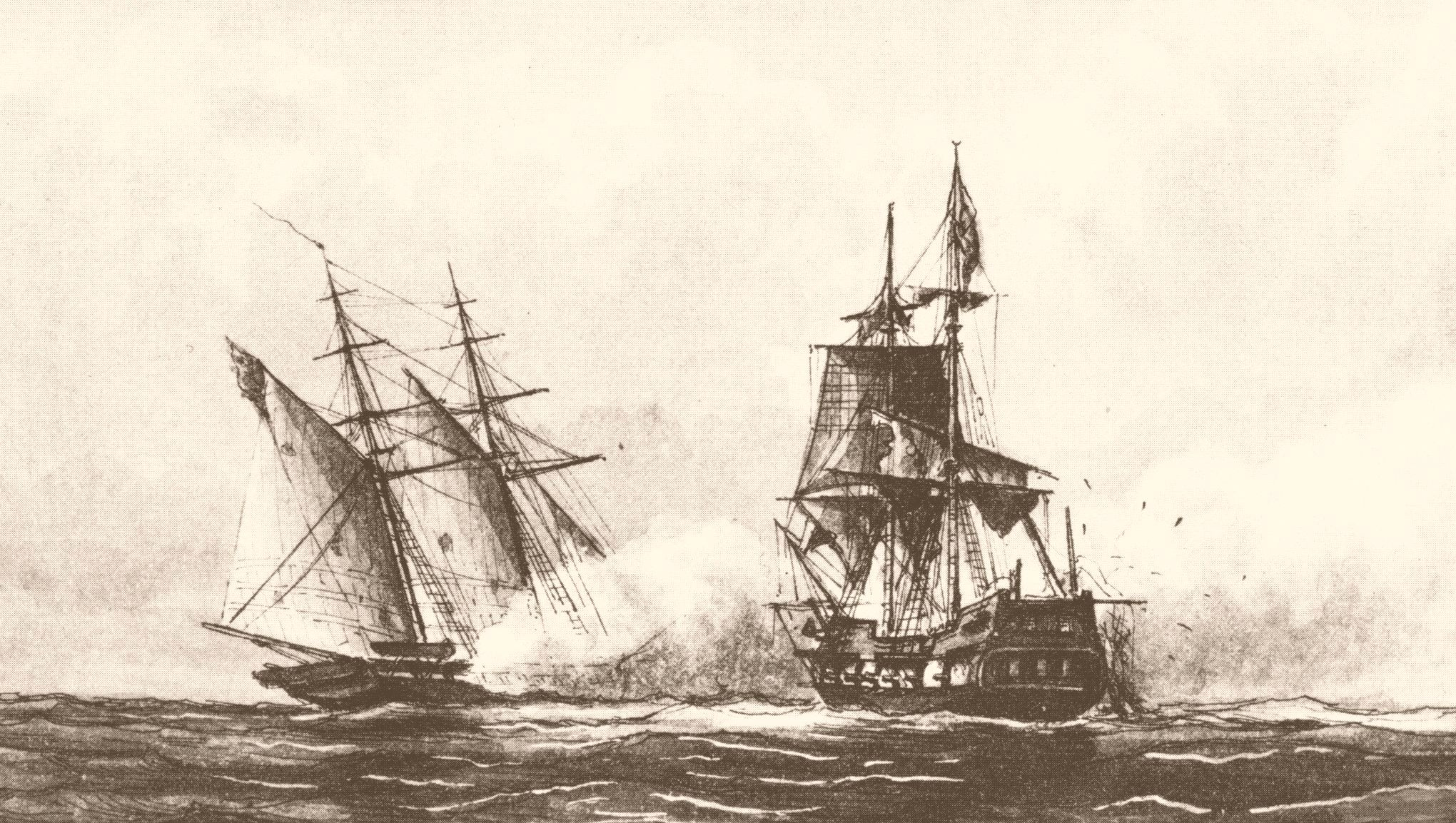
- USS Enterprise fighting the Tripolitan polacca Tripoli. William Bainbridge Hoff, 1878
Date	1 August 1801
Location	between Tripoli (present day Libya) and Malta
Result	American victory

Belligerents
United States	Eyalet of Tripolitania

Commanders and leaders
Andrew Sterett	Rais Mahomet Rous

Strength
Schooner Enterprise; 90 men	Polacca Tripoli; 80 men

Casualties and losses
None	30 killed 30 wounded Tripoli disabled

The action of 1 August 1801 was a single-ship action of the First Barbary War fought between the American schooner USS Enterprise and the Tripolitan polacca Tripoli off the coast of modern-day Libya.

As part of Commodore Richard Dale's Mediterranean Squadron, Enterprise had been deployed with the American force blockading the Vilayet of Tripoli. Enterprise, under the command of Lieutenant Andrew Sterett, had been sent by Commodore Dale to gather supplies at Malta. While cruising towards Malta, Enterprise engaged Tripoli, commanded by Admiral Rais Mahomet Rous. Tripoli put up a stubborn fight and perfidiously feigned surrender three times in an engagement lasting three hours before the polacca was finally captured by the Americans.

Although the Americans had taken the vessel, Sterett had no orders to take prizes and so was obliged to release her. Enterprise completed her journey to Malta and received honor and praise from Dale on her return to the fleet. The success of the battle boosted morale in the United States, since it was that country's first victory in the war against the Tripolitans. The opposite occurred in Tripoli, where morale sank heavily upon learning of Tripoli's defeat. Despite Enterprise's triumph, the war continued indecisively for another four years.

== Background ==
Following the recognition of the independence of the United States in 1783, the early administrations had elected to make tribute payments to the Vilayet of Tripoli to protect American commercial shipping interests in the Mediterranean Sea. Tripoli, nominally a subject of the Ottoman Empire, was practically autonomous in conducting her foreign affairs and would declare war on non-Muslim states whose ships sailed in the Mediterranean in order to extract tribute from them. In 1801, the payments demanded by Tripoli from the United States were significantly increased. The newly elected administration of Thomas Jefferson, an opponent of the tribute payments from their inception, refused to pay. As a result, Tripoli declared war on the United States, and its navy began to seize American ships and crews in an attempt to coerce the Jefferson administration into acceding to their demands. When word of these attacks on American merchantmen reached Washington, D.C., the Jefferson administration gave the United States Navy the authority to conduct limited operations against Tripoli. As part of the American strategy, a squadron under Commodore Richard Dale was dispatched to blockade Tripoli.

By July 1801, Dale's force had begun to run low on water. In order to replenish his supplies, Dale dispatched the schooner USS Enterprise, commanded by Lieutenant Andrew Sterett, to provision at the British naval base on Malta, while Dale remained off Tripoli with the frigate USS President to maintain the blockade. Soon after leaving the blockade, Enterprise came upon what appeared to be a Tripolitan cruiser sailing near her. Flying British colors as a ruse, Enterprise approached the Tripolitan vessel and hailed her. The cruiser answered that she was seeking American vessels. At this Enterprise struck the British colors, raised the American flag, and prepared for action.

The Tripolitan vessel, Tripoli, and Enterprise were quite evenly matched. Enterprise, with a complement of 90, was a 12-gun, 135-ton schooner built in 1799 that had seen action in the Quasi-War. In contrast, Tripoli, a lateen-rigged polacca with two masts, was crewed by 80 men under Admiral Rais Mahomet Rous and armed with 14 guns. Although the Tripolitans held a slight advantage in firepower, Enterprise had to its advantage a larger crew and the element of surprise. The Americans were also significantly more experienced in gunnery action than the Tripolitans, who preferred to attack by boarding and taking over their opponents' ships.

== Battle ==
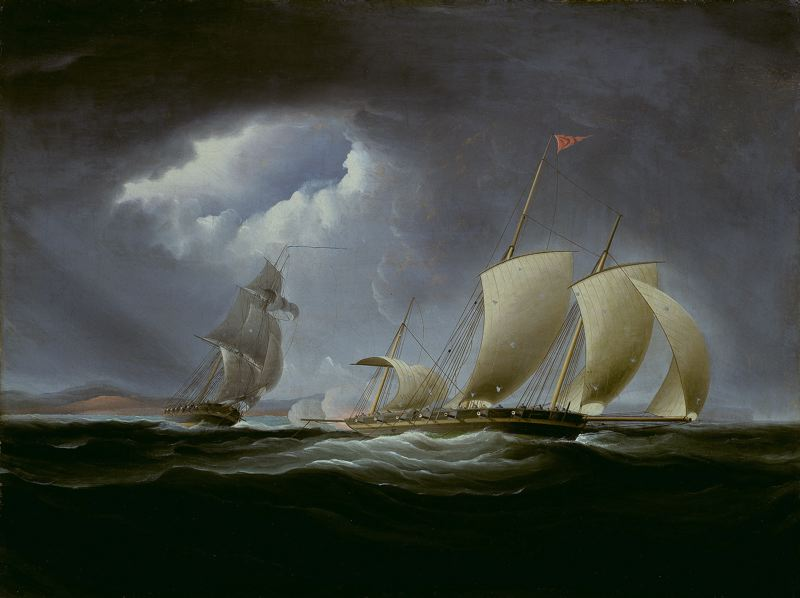
USS Enterprise pursuing Tripoli Thomas Birch, 1806

On August 1, 1801, shortly after Sterett had the American colors raised, he had his men open fire at close range with muskets. In response, Tripoli returned fire with an ineffective broadside. The Americans returned fire with their own broadsides, which led Rous to break off the engagement and attempt to flee. Unable to fight off Enterprise nor outrun her, Tripoli attempted to grapple Enterprise and board her. Once within musket range, Enterprise's Marines opened fire on the Tripoli, foiling its boarding attempt, and forced Tripoli to try to break away once more. Enterprise continued the engagement, firing more broadsides and blasting a hole in Tripoli's hull.

Severely damaged, Tripoli struck her colors to indicate surrender. As Enterprise moved towards the vessel to accept its surrender, the Tripolitans hoisted their flag and fired upon Enterprise. The Tripolitans again attempted to board the American schooner but were repelled by broadsides and musketry. After another exchange of fire, the Tripolitans struck their colors a second time. Sterett once more ceased firing and moved closer to Tripoli. In response, Rous again raised his colors and attempted to board Enterprise. Enterprise's accurate gunnery once more forced Tripoli to veer off. As the action continued, Rous perfidiously feigned a third surrender in an attempt to draw the schooner within grappling range. This time, Sterett kept his distance and ordered Enterprise's guns to be lowered to aim at the polacca's waterline, a tactic that threatened to sink the enemy ship. The next American broadsides struck their target, causing massive damage, dismasting her mizzen-mast and reducing her to a sinking condition. With most of his crew dead or wounded, the injured Admiral Rous finally threw the Tripolitan flag into the sea to convince Sterett to end the action.

== Aftermath ==
At the end of the action Tripoli was severely damaged; 30 of her crew were dead and another 30 injured. The polacca's first lieutenant was among the casualties, and Admiral Rous was injured in the fighting. In what amounted to a total American victory, Enterprise had suffered only superficial damage and no casualties. Sterett, whose orders did not give him the authority to retain prizes, let the polacca limp back to Tripoli. However, before setting her free, the Americans cut down Tripoli's masts and sufficiently disabled her so that she could barely make sail. Sterett then continued his journey to Malta and picked up the supplies for which he was sent before returning to the blockade.

After Enterprise left, Tripoli began its journey back to the port of Tripoli. On the way it ran up on President and asked for assistance; Rous falsely claimed that his vessel was Tunisian and that it had been damaged in an engagement with a French 22-gun vessel. Dale suspected the vessel's true identity and merely provided Rous with a compass so he could find his way back to port. When he arrived at Tripoli, Rous was severely chastised by Yusuf Karamanli, the pasha (ruler) of Tripoli. Stripped of his command, he was paraded through the streets draped in sheep's entrails while seated backwards on a jackass before suffering 500 bastinadoes.

Enterprise's victory over Tripoli had very different consequences for the two nations involved. In Tripoli, the defeat, combined with the severity of Rous' punishment, severely hurt morale throughout the city and led to significant reductions in recruitment for Tripolitan ships' crews. In the United States, the opposite occurred, with wild publicity surrounding the arrival of news that the Americans had won their first victory over the Tripolitans. The American government gave a month's pay as a bonus to each of Enterprise's crew members and honored Sterett by granting him a sword and calling for his promotion. Fanciful plays were written about the victorious Americans, and morale and enthusiasm about the war reached a high point. The victory did not have any long-term consequences in the conduct of the war, however. Dale's blockade of Tripoli was ineffective in preventing ships from entering and leaving the port and was equally ineffective in altering the pasha's diplomatic stance toward the Americans. Dale's squadron was relieved in 1802 by another under Richard Morris.
