= USS Impervious (AM-449) =

Minesweeper of the United States Navy

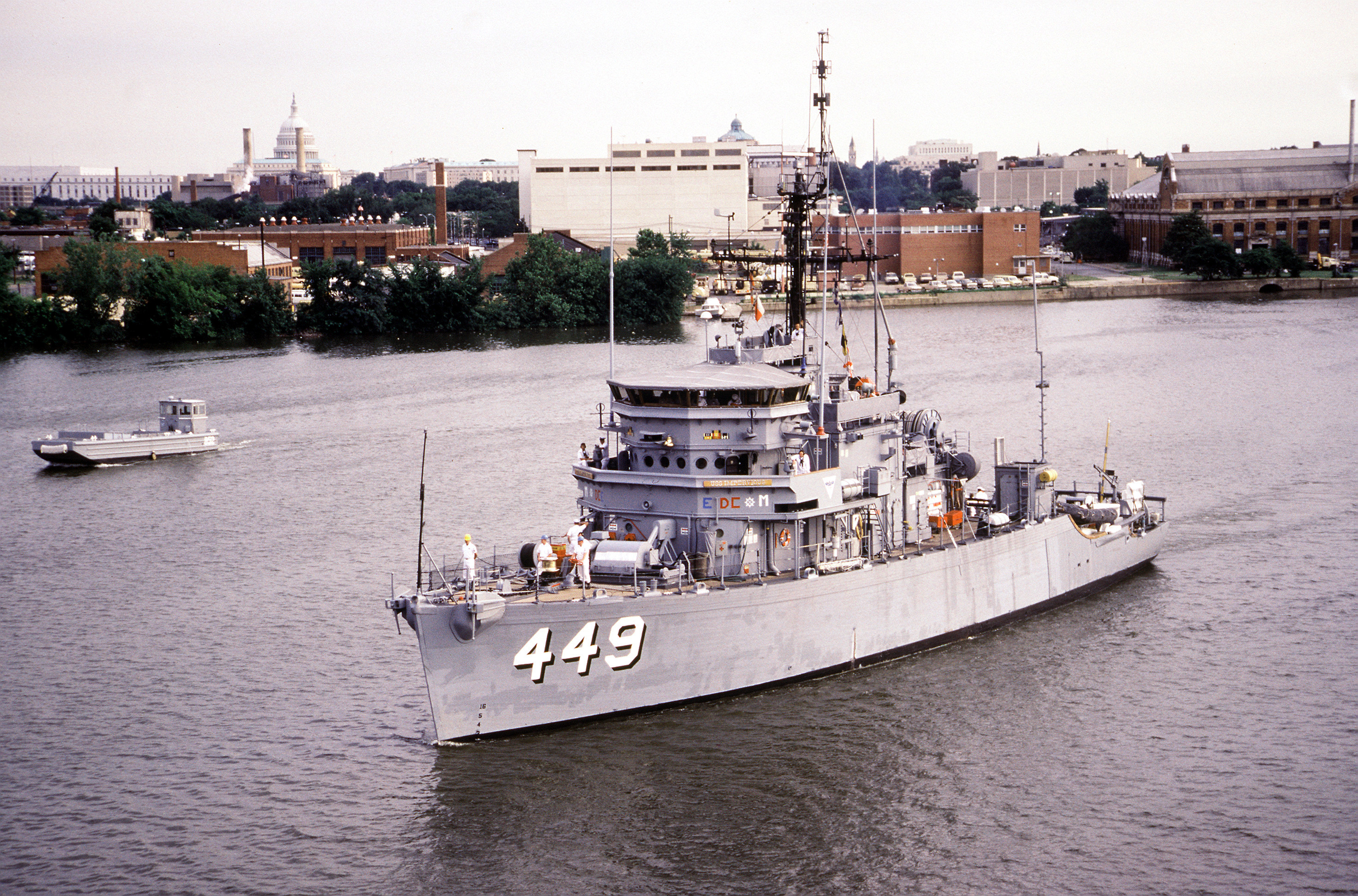
- USS Impervious (MSO-449) underway on 7 July 1990

History

United States
- Builder: Martinolich Shipbuilding Co., San Diego, California
- Laid down: 18 November 1951
- Launched: 29 August 1952
- Commissioned: 15 July 1954
- Decommissioned: 12 December 1991
- Reclassified: MSO-449 on 7 February 1955
- Stricken: 18 March 1992
- Home port: Long Beach, California
- Fate: Scrapped, 4 December 2000

General characteristics
- Class & type: Agile class minesweeper
- Displacement: 620 tons
- Length: 172 ft (52.43 m)
- Beam: 36 ft (10.97 m)
- Draught: 10 ft (3.05 m)
- Propulsion: Four Packard ID1700 diesel engines, two shafts, two controllable pitch propellers
- Speed: 16 knots
- Complement: 74
- Armament: one 40 mm mount

USS Impervious (AM-449/MSO-449) was an Agile-class minesweeper acquired by the U.S. Navy for the task of removing mines that had been placed in the water to prevent the safe passage of ships.

Impervious was launched by Martinolich Shipbuilding Co., San Diego, California, 29 August 1952; sponsored by Miss Mary Lin Moore; and commissioned 15 July 1954.

== First Far East tour ==
Following shakedown and mine warfare training off the California coast, Impervious was reclassified MSO-449 on 7 February 1955. She sailed 1 July with her division for duty in the Far East with the U.S. 7th Fleet, arriving Sasebo via Pearl Harbor 5 August. During this deployment, she operated with ships of the Republic of Korea Navy and visited Taiwan before returning to her home port, Long Beach, 15 February 1956. During the next two years she operated out of Long Beach.

== Her second cruise to the Far East ==
Impervious sailed for her second U.S. 7th Fleet deployment 3 January 1958, and during the next 6 months trained in Japanese waters. She also helped train Nationalist Chinese crews during April and May, preparing them to help to preserve the freedom and independence of Taiwan. The minesweeper returned to Long Beach 15 July 1958, and during September took part in a giant amphibious exercise off Camp Pendleton, California.

== Joint U.S.-Canadian exercises ==
In April 1959 Impervious interrupted her regular training schedule to take part in a joint mine warfare exercise with Canadian ships, and spent the rest of the year on training exercises in California waters. In early 1960 the ship prepared for another deployment to the Far East, sailing 3 May for Japan. During August she participated in maneuvers with Korean and Nationalist Chinese ships, and in October Impervious operated with units of the Philippine Navy in similar operations off Corregidor. She sailed via Guam and Pearl Harbor to Long Beach, arriving 16 November.

== Supporting nuclear testing at Johnston Island ==
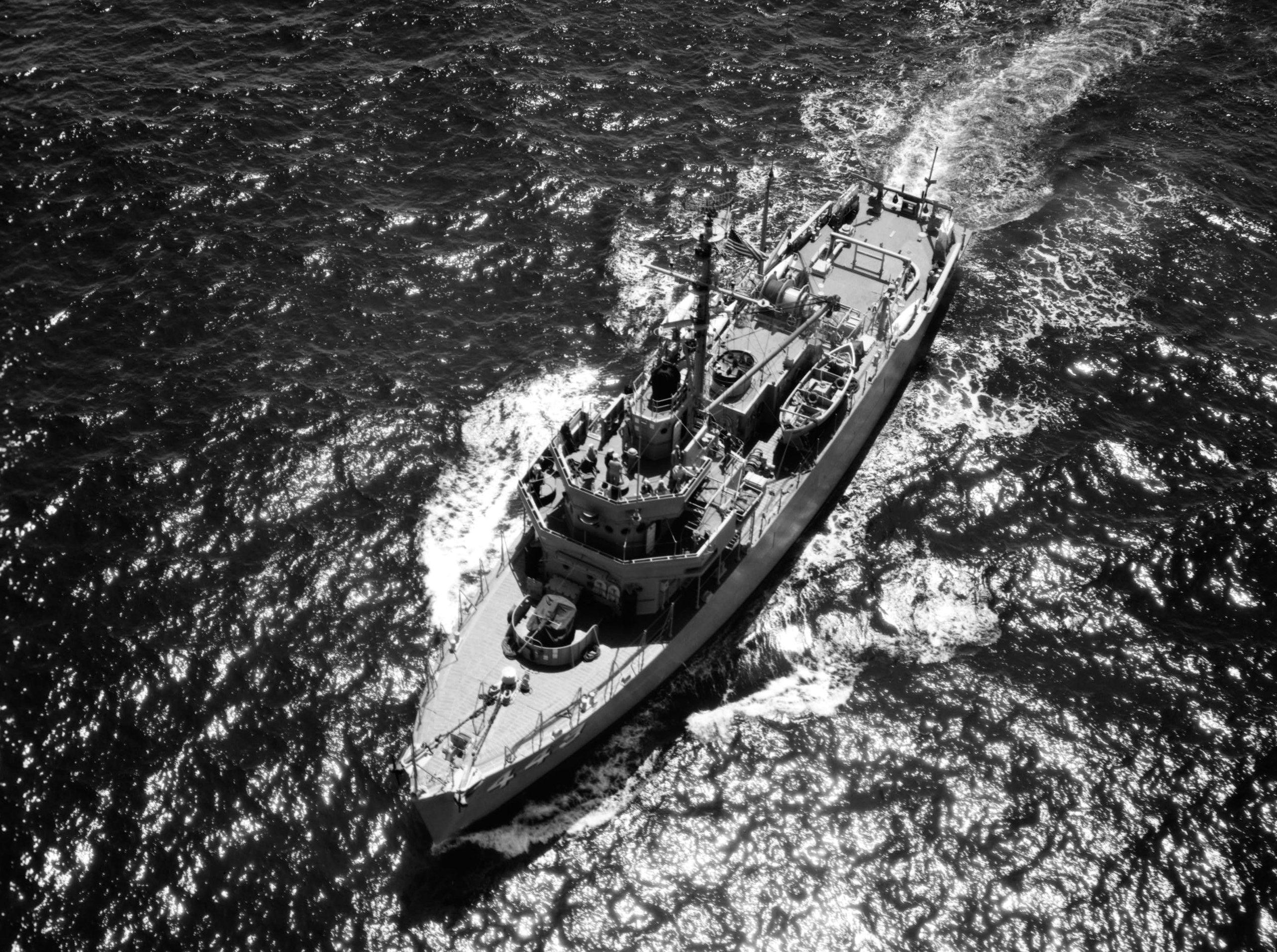
Impervious in 1954.

The ship spent 1961 and early 1962 on important readiness operations, visiting several West Coast ports, and sailed again for U.S. 7th Fleet duty 7 April 1962. After training in the Philippines the minesweeper spent part of July on patrol with Vietnamese Naval units off Danang, and the Navy supported the South Vietnamese people in their fight for freedom. She visited Hong Kong and Yokosuka before arriving Pearl Harbor 8 September 1962. During October and November, Impervious took part in atomic tests at Johnston Island, and arrived Long Beach 21 November.

In March 1963 the ship took part in another large amphibious operation, "Operation Steelgate", then worked out of Long Beach before again joining Canadian ships for mine warfare exercises off British Columbia in November. She got underway for the western Pacific again 8 May 1964, and after stopping at various islands moved to the coast of South Vietnam in September for special operations supporting the American Advisory unit. After mine exercises off the Philippines she returned Long Beach 7 December 1964. The following 12 months were spent in tactics and exercises along the coast of southern California, overhaul at Los Angeles, California, and readiness operations to prepare her for another Far Eastern deployment assisting Allied forces to defend freedom in Southeast Asia.

== Persian Gulf War service ==
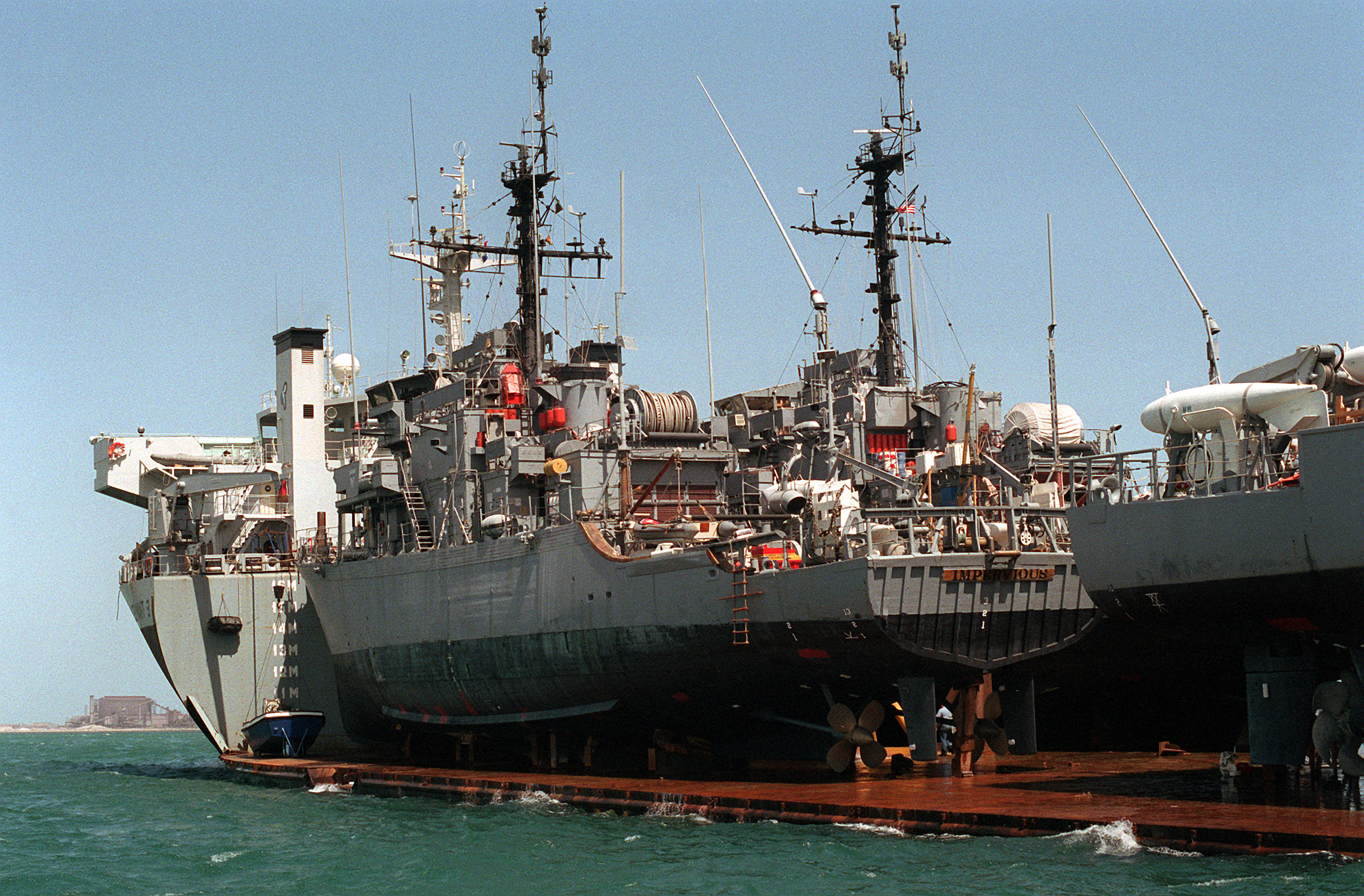
USS Impervious (MSS-449) next to USS Leader (MSO-490) and other ships aboard Super Servant 3.

Impervious was lifted to the Persian gulf following Iraq's invasion of Kuwait. She was loaded aboard the Dutch heavy lift ship Super Servant 3 on 19 August 1990 at Norfolk along with USS Leader (MSO-490), USS Adroit (MSO-509) and USS Avenger (MCM-1). She was offloaded 5 October 1990 in the middle east. Impervious returned to Norfolk on 14 November 1991 with USS Leader (MSO-490) and USS Adroit (MSO-509) aboard Super Servant 4.

She participated in minesweeping operations to clear mines for anticipated d-day style landing by US Marines as part of the diversionary force which allowed land forces to take Iraqi Artillery positions from behind. On 28 February 1991 at 0500 they were ordered to storm the beaches at 0300 they were ordered to stand down as Iraq had surrendered and the war was over. She also did escort duty for the battleships USS Missouri and USS Wisconsin. as part of two naval battle groups built around the aircraft carriers USS Dwight D. Eisenhower and USS Independence to the Gulf, where they were ready by 8 August.

She did riggings for MH 53 Airborne Mine Countermeasures minesweeping helicopters stationed aboard the USS Tripoli (LPH-10). This was the minesweeping gear use to clear anchored mines such as the one that hit Tripoli. Tripoli proceeded into the northern Persian Gulf and assumed duties as flagship for Airborne Mine Countermeasures operations there with MH 53 deployed aboard. On the morning of 18 February 1991, at 0436 (4:36 a.m.) Tripoli was rocked by a mine explosion on her starboard bow.

The explosion ripped a 16 by 20 ft hole in the ship's hull and injured four sailors. The Tripoli was towed off of three other unexploded mines by two MCM ships. After 20 hours of damage control, the ship was stabilized and was actually ready to resume operations. However, her HM-14 fuel tanks were damaged by the mine hit and she was unable to deploy her HM-14s due to a lack of fuel. The Impervious and sister MSO's were her escorts. USS Impervious was responsible for removing these mines that threatened the Tripoli. Soon after the Iraqi invasion, it became clear that Iraq was laying mines in international waters. U.S. ships discovered and destroyed six mines during December. The U.S. Mine Countermeasures Group (USMCMG) was established with the objective of clearing a path to the beach for a possible amphibious landing and battleship gunfire support.

The minesweepers USS Adroit (MSO 509), USS Impervious (MSO 449), and USS Leader (MSO 490) along with the newly commissioned mine countermeasures ship USS Avenger (MCM 1 ) arrived in the Gulf aboard the heavy-lift ship Super Servant III. More than 20 Navy Explosive Ordnance Disposal (EOD) teams were also deployed to support the mine countermeasures force. Allied minesweepers from Saudi Arabia, Great Britain and Kuwait, and the MH-53 Super Stallions of Mine Countermeasures Helicopter Squadron 14 joined the MCM effort.

After months of training off Dubai, United Arab Emirates, USMCMG staff embarked in USS Tripoli (LPH 10) on 20 January, and proceeded to the northern Gulf waters to perform their mission. As flagship for the combined operation, Tripoli's flight deck was the base for the mine-sweeping helicopters. Six British minesweepers joined their U.S. counterparts, with British and U.S. warships providing air defense.

USMCMG began its work 60 miles east of the Kuwaiti coastline, working initially to clear a 15-mile long, 1,000-yard wide path. The mine-clearing task force spent the first few weeks of Desert Storm pushing 24 miles to "Point Foxtrot," a 10-mile by 3.5-mile box which became the battleship gunfire support area south of Faylaka Island.

While sweeping further toward shore, the task group was targeted by Iraqi fire control radars associated with Silkworm missile sites inside Kuwait. Task force ships moved out of Silkworm range and worked to locate the radar site. During those maneuvers on 18 February, Iraqi mines found their mark. Within three hours of each other, Tripoli and USS Princeton (CG 59) were rocked by exploding mines. As damage control teams successfully overcame fires and flooding aboard Tripoli and Princeton, Impervious, Leader and Avenger searched for additional mines in the area. Adroit led the salvage tug USS Beaufort (ATS 2) toward Princeton to tow her to safety.

Tripoli was able to continue her mission for several days before she was relieved by USS La Salle (AGF 3) and USS New Orleans (LPH 11) and proceeded to Bahrain for repairs. New Orleans provided the helicopter deck while the mine group staff moved aboard La Salle to coordinate the operation. Princeton restored her TLAM strike and AEGIS anti-air warfare defense capabilities within fifteen minutes of the mine strike, whereupon she reassumed duties as local anti-air warfare coordinator and remained on station, providing defense for the mine countermeasures group for an additional 30 hours, until relieved.

Charts and intelligence captured from Iraq showed the mine field where Tripoli and Princeton were hit was one of six laid in a 150-mile arc from Faylaka Island to the Saudi-Kuwaiti border. Within that arc, there were four additional mine-lines—a total of more than 1,000 mines—laid over a five-month period.

Three days later, the massive 31-ship amphibious task force moved north to assist in battlefield preparation as the deadline for the ground offensive neared. As Wisconsin and Missouri steamed in the vicinity of recently cleared "Point FOXTROT," their gun crews continued to pound Iraqi targets. Marine AV-8B Harriers launched from the flight deck of Nassau conducted strikes ashore.

== Final status ==
Impervious decommissioned 12 December 1991 and was stricken 18 March 1992. She was sold for scrapping 15 April 1995, but the purchaser defaulted and the contract for sale was cancelled 8 October 1996. She was ultimately sold for scrap 4 December 2000.
