= USS Sterett (DDG-104) =

United States Navy guided missile destroyer

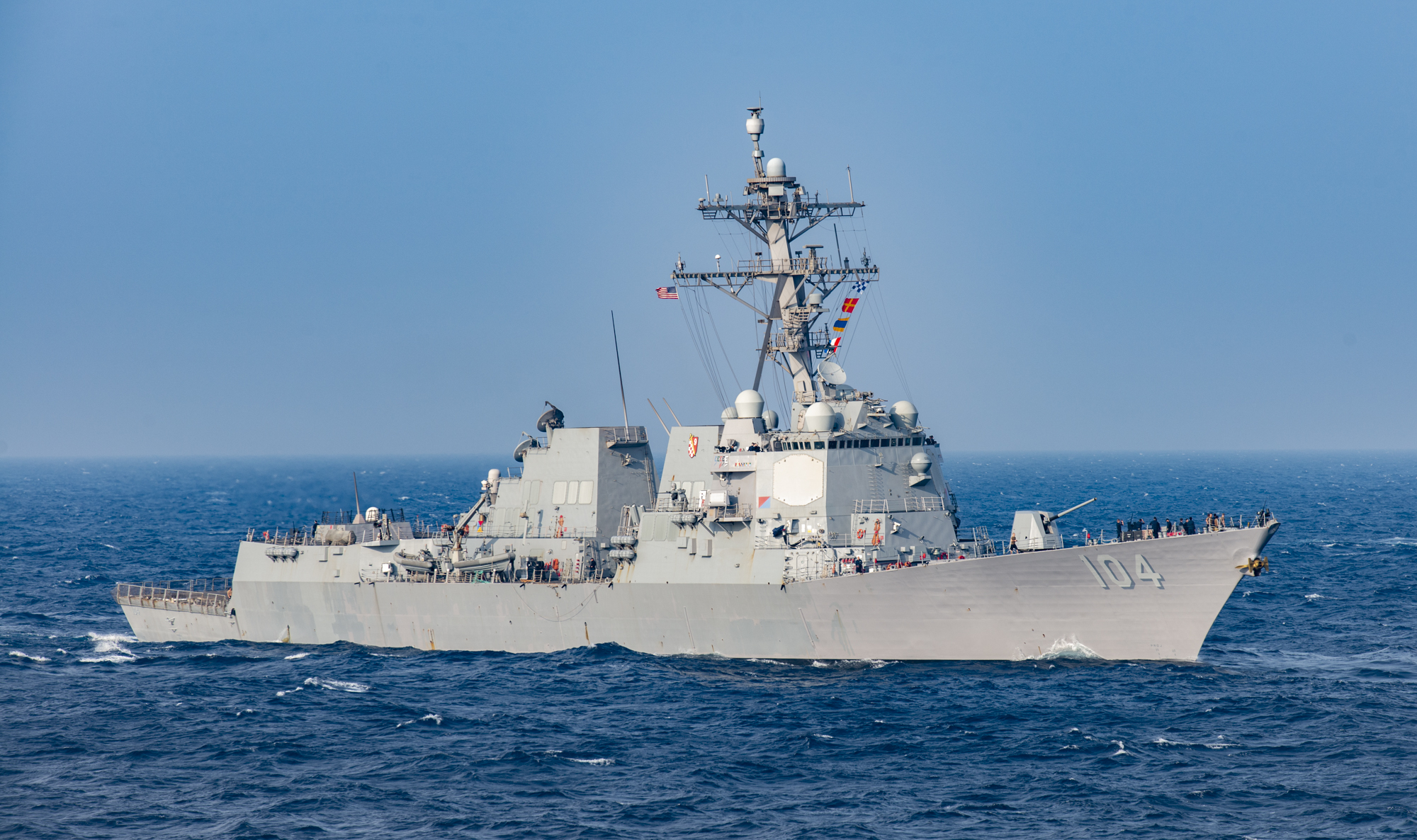
- USS Sterett during Malabar 2020

History

United States
- Name: Sterett
- Namesake: Andrew Sterett
- Ordered: 13 September 2002
- Builder: Bath Iron Works
- Laid down: 17 November 2005
- Launched: 20 May 2007
- Commissioned: 9 August 2008
- Home port: San Diego
- Identification: MMSI number: 369970119; Callsign: NRDT; Hull number: DDG-104
- Motto: Forever Dauntless
- Status: in active service
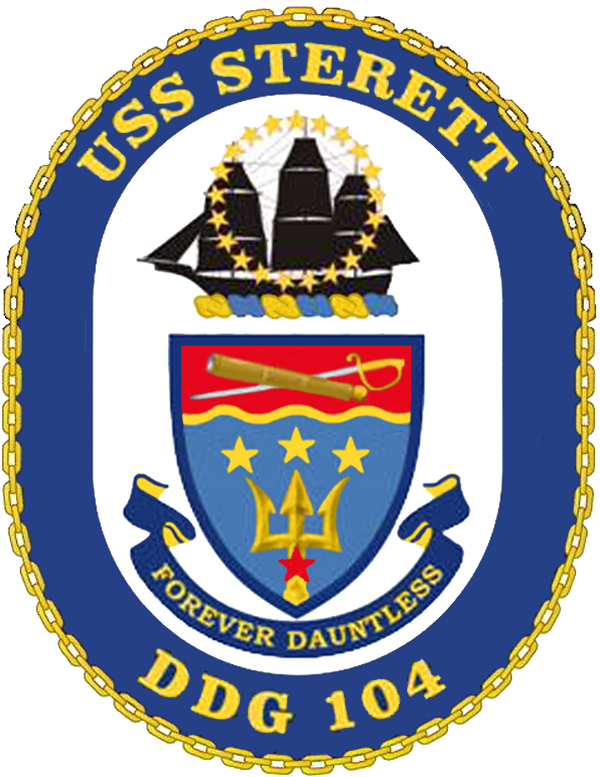
- Badge

General characteristics
- Class & type: Arleigh Burke-class destroyer
- Displacement: 6,600 tons light, 9,200 tons full, 2,600 tons dead
- Length: 509 ft 6 in (155.3 m) overall, 471 ft (143.6 m) waterline
- Beam: 66 ft (20.1 m) extreme, 59 ft (18 m) waterline
- Draft: 31 ft (9.4 m) maximum, 22 ft (6.7 m) limit
- Propulsion: 4 × General Electric LM2500-30 gas turbines, 2 shafts, 100,000 shp (75 MW)
- Speed: 30+ knots (55+ km/h) designed
- Complement: 32 officers, 348 enlisted
- Armament: Guns: 1 × 5-inch (127 mm)/62 Mk 45 Mod 4 (lightweight gun); 1 × 20 mm (0.8 in) Phalanx CIWS; 2 × 25 mm (0.98 in) Mk 38 machine gun system; 4 × 0.50 in (12.7 mm) caliber guns; Missiles: 1 × 32-cell, 1 × 64-cell (96 total cells) Mk 41 vertical launching system (VLS): RIM-66M surface-to-air missile; RIM-156 surface-to-air missile; RIM-174A Standard ERAM; RIM-161 anti-ballistic missile; RIM-162 ESSM (quad-packed); BGM-109 Tomahawk cruise missile; RUM-139 vertical launch ASROC; Torpedoes: 2 × Mark 32 triple torpedo tubes: Mark 46 lightweight torpedo; Mark 50 lightweight torpedo; Mark 54 lightweight torpedo
- Aircraft carried: 2 × MH-60R Seahawk helicopters

USS Sterett (DDG-104) is an Arleigh Burke-class (Flight IIA) Aegis guided missile destroyer of the United States Navy. She is the fourth ship named for Andrew Sterett.

== Etymology ==
USS Sterett is the fourth ship of the U.S. Navy to be named after Andrew Sterett, a U.S. naval officer who fought in the Quasi-War and the Barbary Wars.

== History ==
The contract to build USS Sterett was awarded to Bath Iron Works Corporation in Bath, Maine on 13 September 2002. On 17 November 2005, her keel was laid down, and she was christened on 19 May 2007. The ship's sponsor was Michelle Sterett Bernson, a familial descendant of Andrew Sterett, who himself had no children.

The vessel's commissioning took place in Baltimore, Maryland, Andrew Sterett's birthplace, on 9 August 2008. The ship's home port is Naval Base San Diego.

The ship was attacked by Somali pirates using rocket-propelled grenades on 22 February 2011, during negotiations with the pirates for the release of four U.S. hostages, who were eventually killed.

The ship was under the control of Commander Carrier Strike Group 9.

== Awards ==
- Combat Action Ribbon
- Navy Unit Commendation
- Navy Meritorious Unit Commendation
- Battle "E" – (2010, 2011, 2012, 2014, 2017, 2018, 2020, 2023, 2024, 2025)
- Spokane Trophy - (2010, 2023, 2025)
- Vice Admiral Thomas H. Copeman III Material Readiness Award - (2023)
- Marjorie Sterrett Battleship Fund Award - (2017)

== In popular culture ==
- USS Sterett served as one of the filming locations for the TNT's television series The Last Ship and its fictional setting, USS Nathan James (DDG-151).
- USS Sterett served as the backdrop for a historic visit to Naval Base Point Loma by President Joe Biden in March 2023. The crew gave him a "line-the-rail" salute.
