= USS Sterett (CG-31) =

1964 Belknap-class cruiser

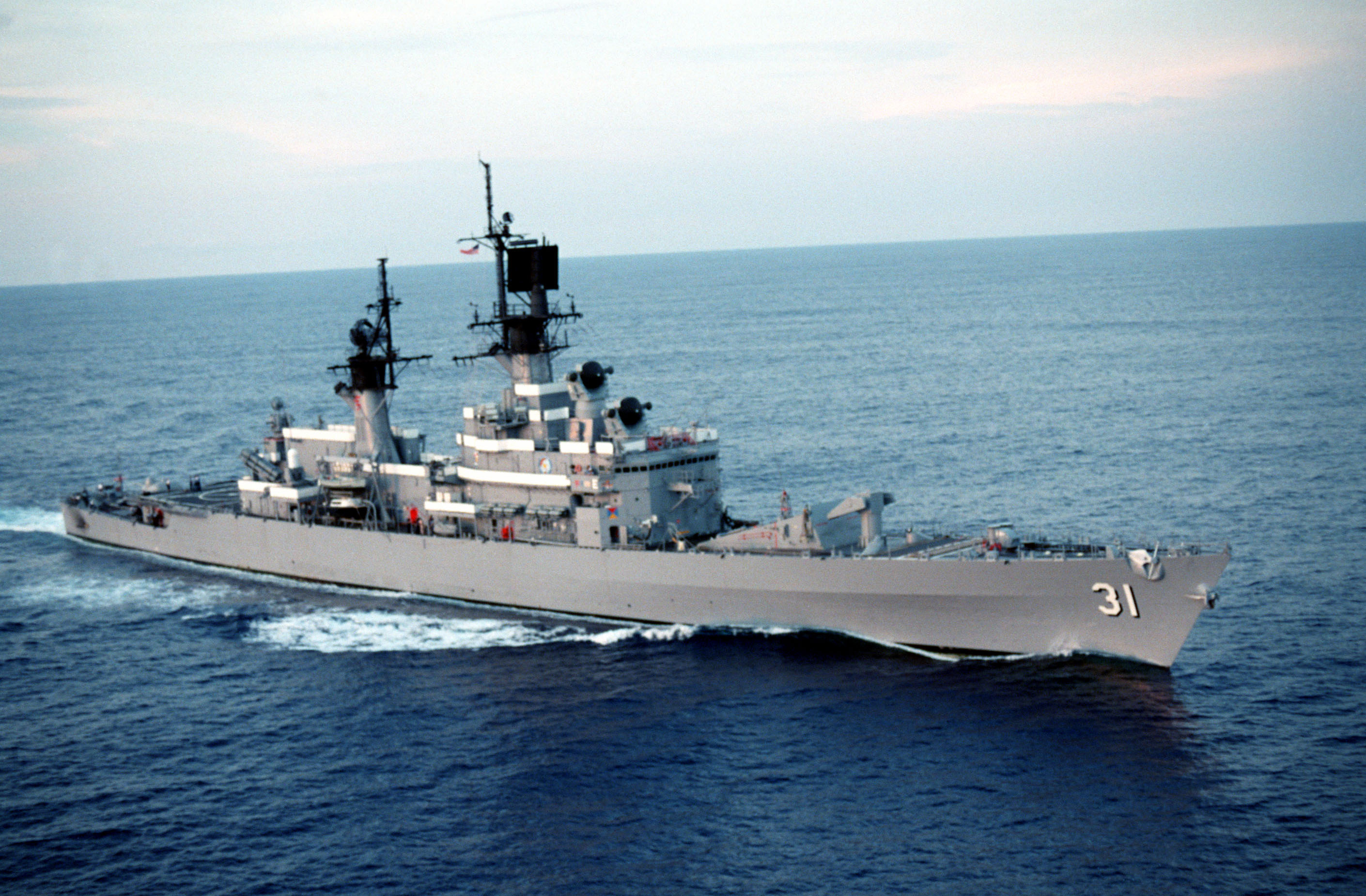
- USS Sterett (DLG-31/CG-31)

History

United States
- Name: Sterett
- Namesake: Andrew Sterett
- Ordered: 20 September 1961
- Builder: Puget Sound Naval Shipyard
- Laid down: 25 September 1962
- Launched: 30 June 1964
- Acquired: 16 June 1967
- Commissioned: 8 April 1967
- Decommissioned: 24 March 1994
- Reclassified: CG-31 on 30 June 1975
- Stricken: 24 March 1994
- Home port: Various: Yokosuka, JN; Subic Bay, PI; San Diego, CA; Long Beach, CA
- Motto: Dauntless
- Fate: Stricken, contract awarded for the dismantling of this ship July 2005
- Badge

General characteristics
- Class & type: Belknap-class cruiser
- Displacement: 7,930 tons
- Length: 547 ft (167 m)
- Beam: 55 ft (17 m)
- Draft: 28 ft 10 in (8.79 m)
- Speed: 30 knots (35 mph; 56 km/h)
- Complement: 418 officers and men
- Sensors & processing systems: AN/SPS-48E air-search radar; AN/SPS-49(V)5 air-search radar; AN/SPG-55B fire-control radar; AN/SPG-53F gun fire-control radar; AN/SQS-26 sonar
- Electronic warfare & decoys: AN/SLQ-32
- Armament: 1 x Mark 42 5 in (130 mm)/54 gun; 2 x 3 in (76 mm) guns, 1 x Terrier missile / SM-2ER launcher, 6 x 15.5-inch (394 mm) torpedo tubes, Harpoon missiles, Phalanx CIWS

USS Sterett (DLG/CG-31) was a Belknap-class destroyer leader / cruiser. She was the third ship to be named for Master Commandant Andrew Sterett (1778–1807), who served during the Quasi-War with France and the Barbary Wars. She was launched as DLG-31, a frigate, and reclassified a cruiser (CG) on 30 June 1975.

The contract to construct Sterett was awarded on 20 September 1961. Her keel was laid down at Puget Sound Naval Shipyard on 25 September 1962. Sponsored by Mrs. Phyllis Nitze, wife of Secretary of the Navy, Paul H. Nitze, she was launched on 30 June 1964, delivered to the navy on 16 June 1967 and commissioned on 8 April 1967.

Sterett earned nine battle stars for her service along the coast of Vietnam.

== 1967–1975 ==
Sterett spent 1967 operating off the west coast undergoing various post-acceptance tests and trials after commissioning, participating in shakedown training, and generally preparing for her final acceptance trials. Arriving in the Puget Sound Naval Shipyard again she underwent post-shakedown availability. With the exception of two short excursions, one for nuclear capable certification and the other for COMTUEX 8–68, Sterett remained in home port until 19 June, when she departed San Pedro Bay for her first WestPac tour. After stops at Pearl Harbor and Midway, she arrived in Yokosuka, Japan, on 5 July and began preparations for her first line period in the Tonkin Gulf.

On 31 July 1968, Sterett relieved guided missile frigate USS Horne as Positive Identification Radar Advisory Zone (PIRAZ) unit. With destroyer USS Rich, she plied the waters off North Vietnam until relieved on 5 August. She moved on to duty as sea air rescue (SAR) ship and strike support ship (SSS), which she performed until 4 September, directing two successful pilot rescues. Sterett continued alternating between PIRAZ, SAR, SSS, and in-port periods until mid-March 1969.

In the results of the CRUDESPAC Battle Efficiency Competition announced in March, Sterett won the Green "E" for Operations, the White "E" for Missiles, the Red "E" for Engineering, and the Blue "E" for Supply. Congratulatory messages were received from COMSEVENTHFLT and COMCRUDESFLOT ELEVEN.

The next at sea period began with ten days on the Sea of Japan PARPRO picket station. During this line period, United States Air Force 314th Air Division F-106 interceptors from Osan Air Base under Sterett's positive control intercepted six Soviet Tupolev Tu-16 aircraft and one Soviet Beriev Be-12 seaplane on ASW patrol. When Sterett was relieved by USS Richmond K. Turner on 10 March, the turnover was shadowed by a Soviet Petya-class PCE, hull number 857. The Petya had been on patrol at the Soviet Korean Straits station and followed Richmond K. Turner to TU 71.0.4. The next day Sterett, en route to the Gulf of Tonkin, sighted a fishing boat north of Taiwan flying the Republic of Korea ensign. The boat, later identified as BT 22210, was adrift with its engine inoperative and making frantic visual signals for assistance. Despite the heavy seas of a tropical storm Sterett immediately transferred food and fuel to the distressed craft, a vessel of some fifty feet with a crew of seven. Sterett sent urgent message requests for additional assistance to COMNAVFORKOREA, who eventually arranged a commercial tow for the crippled fishing vessel. Having rendered all appropriate assistance, Sterett proceeded through the Taiwan Straits to the Tonkin Gulf.

The Gulf of Tonkin DLG AAW pickets normally operate with a DD escort but, during April 1970, Sterett operated at a modified PIRAZ station 20NM from the North Vietnamese coast with the cruiser USS Oklahoma City, COMSEVENTHFLT embarked, as her escort. This was a plot to lure out a MiG from the airbase at the Bai Thuong Air Base, which at that time was the base for three MiG-21 and three MiG-19 fighters. Oklahoma City had EMCON (EMission CONdition) set to simulate the normal DD escort and Sterett passed track information on hostile aircraft over North Vietnam to the Talos ship via the Navy RED secure voice (KY-8) net and the NTDS Link 14 teletype. Although this missile trap was well-conceived, there was no MiG activity over Bai Thuong during this period.

Sterett continued to shuttle back and forth between Yokosuka and the Gulf of Tonkin for the first seven months of 1970. She alternated between PIRAZ duty and SAR/SSS duty, taking time out for a six-day stay at Hong Kong, an overnight layover in Keelung, Taiwan, and a two-day visit to EXPO '70 at Kobe, Japan. On 29 July 1971 Sterett set sail from Yokosuka to return to the United States.

After two years Sterett returned to CONUS and entered via San Diego Bay. Sterett spent all of 1971 either in port on, or operating off, the west coast.

On 7 January 1972, Sterett traveled on her second tour of duty off the Vietnamese coast. She departed for the Gulf of Tonkin and remained on PIRAZ station when on 21 February 1972 became the first United States Navy ship to direct the downing of a MiG-21 by Air Force Combat Air Patrol. During her second line period of the deployment, Sterett participated in the downing of two more MiGs (30 March) and brought down another with a salvo of Terrier missiles during the Dong Hoi engagement on 19 April. Later on that day, she launched a second salvo of Terriers at an unidentified target, probably a Styx surface-to-surface missile, destroying it in midair. After adding two more successful pilot rescues to her tally, she returned to Subic Bay on 22 May.

Four months later she returned to San Diego and operated off the west coast for the rest of 1972.

On 25 March 1973 during transit, Sterett's LAMPS helicopter crashed while ferrying the chaplain between ships for religious services, fortunately, all crewmen survived.

Sterett participated in one last tour of duty, after the cease fire negotiations, in Vietnam in 1973 that was uneventful. She ended 1973 by docking in San Diego in preparations for regular overhaul to begin in February 1974.

== Late 1970s ==
On 30 June 1975, Sterett was reclassified as a guided missile cruiser—CG-31. In October of that year Sterett was deployed to the Western Pacific serving in the South China Sea and the Gulf of Tonkin. During this 8-month deployment Sterett visited the Philippines, Singapore, Thailand, Hong Kong, Okinawa, Korea and Japan. The vessel completed the WESTPAC tour in May or 1976 and returned to San Diego. The remainder of 1976 and the first part of 1977 were spent on operations in the SOCAL area.

In March 1977, following embarkation of Helicopter Anti-submarine Light Squadron (HSL-33), Sterett departed San Diego for Yokosuka, Japan. On 11 March 1977 during transit, HSL-33's Seasprite helicopter crashed at sea, LCdr Jeffrey Smith was lost at sea, while the rest of the crew were rescued. Following visits to the Philippines, Indonesia and the Australia, the warship was dispatched to Iran for operations with the Imperial Iranian Navy. After returning to operations in the Indian Ocean, Sterett returned to San Diego in October 1977. The rest of 1977 was spent on upkeep and operations in the SOCAL area.

Sterett underwent a long maintenance availability from January through March 1978 followed by refresher training (REFTRA). From May 1978 to June Midshipmen embarked on Sterett for annual training. In July, the vessel traveled up the west coast to Portland during the Rose Festival and Seattle for the SeaFair celebration. In September 1978, Sterett departed San Diego for operations in the Western Pacific and Indian Ocean. On 7 December, the destroyer leader was dispatched to the Gulf of Oman. Sterett was stationed off the coast of Iran during the Iranian Revolution. The vessel remained on station until relieved on 14 January 1979.

In April 1979, Sterett departed Subic Bay en route to San Diego. Sterett's Tactical Data System equipment was removed in June and in July 1979, the ship began a regular overhaul at the Long Beach Naval Shipyard. The overhaul was completed in October 1980, followed by sea trials, qualification trials and combat systems training.

== 1983 ==
On 20 July 1983 Sterett rescued 264 Vietnamese boat people in the Gulf of Thailand.

Sterett was involved in the search for the wreckage of Korean Air Lines Flight 007 in late 1983; along with the United States Coast Guard Cutter Munro. Arriving on station 14 September, the Sterett became flagship of the US Search and Rescue/Salvage Task Force 71 which operated until the beginning of November.

== 1984–1986 ==
In the winter of 1985 Sterett, departed her tropical homeport and transited once again to the North Pacific Ocean to conduct surveillance on the newest Soviet aircraft carrier upon its departure from Vladivostok, Russia. In February 1986 the vessel set sail for Manila Harbor from Subic Bay Naval Base for the possible evacuation of the Philippine presidential family during the People Power Revolution. They were eventually evacuated by the Air Force. Sterett's homeport was Subic Bay Naval Station in the Philippines and was the only combatant home ported there.

In 1991, Sterett received a comprehensive overhaul including New Threat Upgrade (NTU), a major anti-aircraft warfare systems improvement.

After 27 years of service, Sterett was decommissioned on 24 March 1994. She was struck from the register the same day to be scrapped. 29 July 2005, International Shipbreaking Limited of Brownsville, Texas was contracted to dismantle and recycle ex-Sterett.
