= Andrew Sterett =

United States Navy officer (1778-1807)

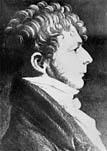
- Portrait of Sterett, c. 1800
- Born: January 27, 1778; Baltimore, Maryland, U.S.
- Died: January 9, 1807 (aged 28); Off the coast of Cape Horn, Chile
- Military career
- Allegiance: United States of America
- Branch: United States Navy
- Service years: 1798–1805
- Rank: Master commandant
- Commands: USS Enterprise
- Conflicts: Quasi-War; USS Constellation vs Insurgente; USS Enterprise vs Amour de la Patrie; First Barbary War; USS Enterprise vs Tripoli
- Other work: United States Merchant Marines

Andrew Sterett (January 27, 1778 – January 9, 1807) was a United States Navy officer who served in the Quasi-War and First Barbary War. He commanded the schooner USS Enterprise in both conflicts.

== Early life ==
Sterett was born in Baltimore, Maryland to John Sterett, a former Revolutionary War captain and a successful shipping merchant. The fourth of ten children, Andrew nevertheless inherited a sizable amount of money. He resolved to join the Navy despite his inheritance, and was commissioned as a lieutenant on March 25, 1798. His family was of English descent.

== The Quasi-War ==
Sterett's first assignment was as Third Lieutenant of the USS Constellation, under Captain Thomas Truxtun, which was sent to do battle with French vessels during the Quasi-War. He was commanding a gun battery when Constellation defeated and captured the French frigate Insurgente on February 9, 1799. Insurgente lost 29 dead and 41 wounded; the only American loss was a seaman run through by Sterett's saber in a summary execution, the seaman, Neal Harvey, having abandoned his post in a panic. Upon Constellation's arrival back in Baltimore, the Anti-Federalist press, who opposed the military in general and the Quasi-War in particular, seized upon this incident as an example of the Navy's "arrogance and cold-bloodedness". The objections intensified when Sterett was heard to say, "We put men to death for even looking pale on this ship." The Navy, however, soon promoted Sterett to the rank of first lieutenant.

A year later, Sterett was involved in a battle to a draw with the 54-gun French frigate Vengeance. Soon afterward, he took command of the schooner USS Enterprise where he remained through the end of the Quasi-War, capturing the privateer Amour de la Patrie on 24 December 1800.

== The Barbary Wars ==
After resupplying in Baltimore, Sterett sailed Enterprise to the Barbary Coast in June 1801 as part of a force under Commodore Richard Dale in the first stages of the Barbary Wars.

On August 1, 1801, Enterprise under Sterett's command defeated the 14-gun Tripoli, a Tripolitan corsair. After twice faking surrender, Tripoli suffered 30 dead and 30 wounded, including the Captain, Rais Mahomet Rous, and the first officer. Enterprise suffered no casualties. Since there was no formal declaration of war, Enterprise was under orders not to take prizes. After her crew was ordered to dump its guns overboard, Tripoli was allowed to sail home, where her captain was humiliated and punished.

Enterprise was sent back to Baltimore with dispatches after this engagement. While there, on the recommendation of Congress, Sterett was presented by President Thomas Jefferson with a sword in gratitude of the victory over the Tripoli. A letter dated 13 July 1805 stated that the sword would be presented to him along with the letter. Enterprise's crew was also rewarded with an extra month's pay. The ship returned to the Mediterranean in November 1802.

Sterett turned over command of the Enterprise to Stephen Decatur in April 1803. He was then promoted to Master Commandant and offered the command of a brig which was under construction. On November 15, 1803 he is granted a furlough to make a commercial voyage to the East Indies. At some point his ship "Canton' is wrecked at unknown date and location, he is rescued, date unknown, the rescue ship proceeded to Lisbon, Portugal. He departs Lisbon for the U.S. in early April, 1805.

== Resignation ==
Sterett had been senior in rank to Decatur, but due to their comparative length of service, in 1803, Decatur was selected to be promoted above Sterett. Sterett therefore resigned from the Navy, on June 29, 1805, to join the merchant marine.

== Final voyage ==
In August 1806, Sterett was hired by Baltimore ship owner Lemuel Taylor to captain Taylor's sloop Warren on a trading voyage to the North West coast of America and China (though there were rumors that the ship was actually headed to the West Indies or South America with a cargo of contraband). Taylor selected Procopio Pollock, son of Revolutionary War financier Oliver Pollock, as the Warren's supercargo (cargo master). Both men were given sealed orders that were not to be opened until a certain point in the voyage.

On September 12, the Warren sailed out of Baltimore with a complement of about 112 men, including four officers (all previously known to Sterett). In early December, off the coast of Brazil, Sterett and Pollock opened their instructions. To his horror Sterett discovered that Taylor's orders to Pollock gave Pollock control over not only the cargo but operational control of the vessel as well; they stated that the ship was to proceed to the west coast of South America, where Pollock was to engage in trade as he saw fit. These orders, different from those given to Sterett and in violation of the articles of employment signed by the crew, caused a violent argument between Sterett and Pollock. Sterett seems to have been driven into a frenzy bordering on madness; he was heard by members of the crew to say that before he would follow such orders he would kill either Pollock or himself. About a week later, after apparently trying unsuccessfully to shoot Pollock, Captain Sterett retired to his cabin alone and shot himself in the head. He lingered in agonizing pain for two weeks before dying on 9 January 1807, a few weeks shy of his 29th birthday and shortly before the ship rounded Cape Horn. Neither the records of the Warren or a lawsuit later filed against Taylor by the crew make any mention of Sterett's body, so it is presumed that he was buried at sea.

== Legacy ==
Four ships of the United States Navy have been named USS Sterett in his honor.
