= USS Adroit (MSO-509) =

Minesweeper of the United States Navy

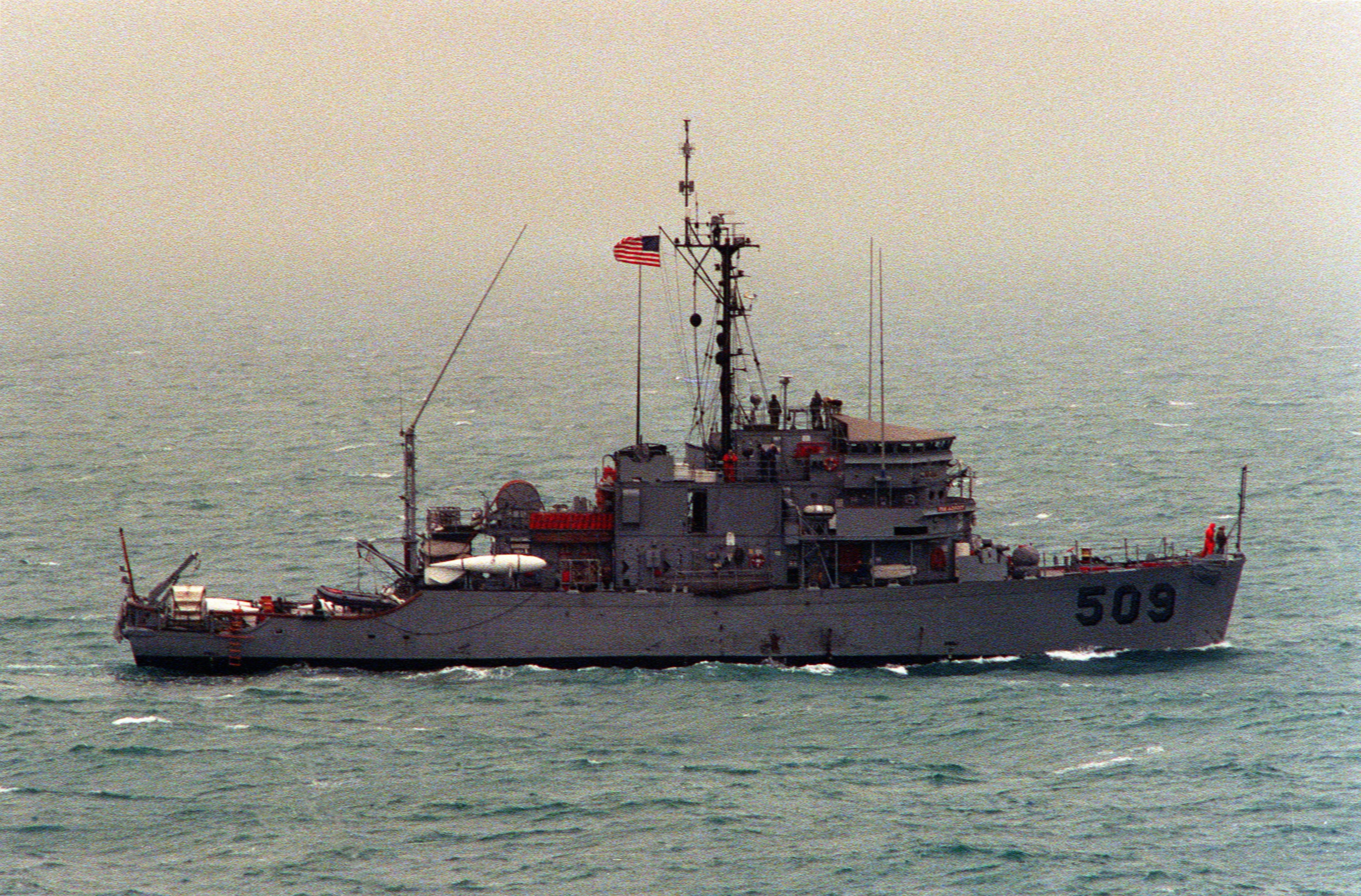

History

United States
- Laid down: 18 November 1954
- Launched: 20 August 1955
- Commissioned: 4 March 1957
- Decommissioned: 12 December 1991
- Stricken: 8 May 1992
- Home port: Charleston, South Carolina; Newport, Rhode Island; Portsmouth Naval Shipyard; Little Creek, Virginia
- Fate: Scrapped at Wilmington, North Carolina, 30 May 1995

General characteristics
- Displacement: 775 tons (full load)
- Length: 172 ft 11.5 in (52.718 m)
- Beam: 35 ft 1.25 in (10.6998 m)
- Draught: 10 ft 4 in (3.15 m)
- Speed: 15 knots
- Complement: 78
- Armament: 40 mm mount (prior 1969), Two .50 cal (12.7 mm) machine guns (after 1969)

USS Adroit (AM-509/MSO-509) was an minesweeper acquired by the U.S. Navy for the task of removing mines that had been placed in the water to prevent the safe passage of ships.

The second ship to be named Adroit by the Navy, MSO-509 was laid down on 18 November 1954 at Boothbay Harbor, Maine, by Frank L. Sample, Jr., Inc. as AM-509; redesignated MSO 509 on 7 February 1955, named Adroit on 17 May 1955; launched on 20 August 1955; sponsored by Mrs. Alice G. Olsen, the wife of Capt. Eliot Olsen, and commissioned on 4 March 1957.

== East Coast operations ==
Following commissioning, Adroit completed fitting out and then moved south to Charleston, South Carolina. From that port, she conducted shakedown training in the West Indies and in the local operating area. The minesweeper then began a period of almost 17 years of service with the Atlantic Fleet Mine Force. During that time, she provided services for several Navy organizations most notably the Naval Mine Defense Laboratory (after 1971 the Naval Coastal Systems Laboratory) at Panama City, Florida, the Naval Ordnance Laboratory Test Facility at Ft. Lauderdale, Florida, and the Mine Warfare School at Charleston, South Carolina. In addition, Adroit participated in Gordon Cooper's Project Mercury, space shot in May 1963 and helped the Naval Oceanographic Office to conduct a test in March 1970. The minesweeper also made occasional deployments to both the Mediterranean sea and the West Indies. During her tour of duty with the U.S. 6th Fleet in the summer of 1958, she earned the Armed Forces Expeditionary Medal as a result of service off the coast of strife-torn Lebanon. For the most part, however, normal operations such as exercises and goodwill port visits occupied her time overseas. While serving in home waters, she concentrated on type training independent ship's exercises, regular overhauls, and repair periods.

== Reassigned to Newport, Rhode Island ==
The character of Adroit's Navy career changed significantly midway through 1973. That summer, she received word of her reassignment to naval reserve training duty and of a change of home ports from Charleston to Newport, Rhode Island. She departed Charleston on 24 September and arrived in Newport on the 28th. The minesweeper spent the remainder of her Navy career training naval reservists. She operated along the U.S. East Coast participating in a number of exercises most frequently independent ship's exercises and amphibious assault training. In August 1977, her base was changed to Portsmouth Naval Shipyard in Kittery Maine (near Portsmouth, New Hampshire), whence she operated for more than four years. Early in October 1981 Adroit changed home ports once again from Portsmouth Naval Shipyard, to Little Creek, Virginia. As of December 1987, she was still operating from the Naval Amphibious Base, Little Creek, Virginia. She deployed to the Persian Gulf in 1991. She operated with The Multinational Coalition Mine Countermeasure Force that found approximately 1300 Iraqi-laid mines in the Gulf.

=== Persian Gulf War service ===
USS Adroit (MSO-509) was lifted to the Persian Gulf following Iraq's invasion of Kuwait. She was loaded aboard the Dutch heavy lift ship Super Servant 3 on 19 August 1990 at Norfolk along with USS Leader (MSO-490), USS Impervious (MSO-449) and USS Avenger (MCM-1). She was offloaded 5 October 1990 in the middle east. Impervious returned to Norfolk on 14 November 1991 with USS Leader (MSO-490) and USS Adroit (MSO-509) aboard Super Servant 4. She participated in minesweeping operations to clear mines for anticipated d-day style landing by US Marines as part of the diversionary force which allowed land forces to take Iraqi Artillery positions from behind. On 28 February 1991 at 0500 they were ordered to storm the beaches at 0300 they were ordered to stand down as Iraq had surrendered and the war was over. She also did escort duty for the battleships USS Missouri and USS Wisconsin. as part of two naval battle groups built around the aircraft carriers USS Dwight D. Eisenhower and USS Independence to the Gulf, where they were ready by 8 August. She did riggings for HM-14 Airborne Mine Countermeasures minesweeping helicopters stationed aboard the USS Tripoli. This was the minesweeping gear use to clear anchored mines such as the one that hit Tripoli. Tripoli proceeded into the northern Persian Gulf and assumed duties as flagship for Airborne Mine Countermeasures operations there with HM-14 deployed aboard. On the morning of 18 February 1991, at 0436 ( 4:37 a.m.) Tripoli was rocked by a mine explosion on her starboard bow. The explosion ripped a 16 by 20 ft hole in the ship's hull and injured four sailors. The Tripoli was towed off of three other unexploded mines by two MCM ships. After 20 hours of damage control, the ship was stabilized and was actually ready to resume operations. However her HM-14 fuel tanks were damaged by the mine hit and she was unable to deploy her HM-14's due to a lack of fuel. The Impervious and sister MSO's were her escorts. USS Impervious was responsible for removing these mines that threatened the Tripoli. Soon after the Iraqi invasion, it became clear that Iraq was laying mines in international waters. U.S. ships discovered and destroyed six mines during December. The U.S. Mine Countermeasures Group (USMCMG) was established with the objective of clearing a path to the beach for a possible amphibious landing and battleship gunfire support.

The minesweepers USS Adroit (MSO 509), USS Impervious (MSO 449), and USS Leader (MSO 490) along with the newly commissioned mine countermeasures ship USS Avenger (MCM 1 ) arrived in the Persian Gulf aboard the heavy-lift ship Super Servant III. More than 20 Navy Explosive Ordnance Disposal (EOD) teams were also deployed to support the mine countermeasures force. Allied minesweepers from Saudi Arabia, Great Britain and Kuwait, and the MH-53 Super Stallions of Mine Countermeasures Helicopter Squadron 14 joined the MCM effort.

After months of training off Dubai, United Arab Emirates, USMCMG staff embarked in USS Tripoli (LPH 10) on 20 January, and proceeded to the northern Persian Gulf waters to perform their mission. As flagship for the combined operation, Tripoli's flight deck was the base for the mine-sweeping helicopters. Six British minesweepers joined their U.S. counterparts, with British and U.S. warships providing air defense.

USMCMG began its work 60 miles east of the Kuwaiti coastline, working initially to clear a 15-mile long, 1,000-yard wide path. The mine-clearing task force spent the first few weeks of Desert Strom pushing 24 miles to "Point Foxtrot," a 10-mile by 3.5-mile box which became the battleship gunfire support area south of Faylaka Island.

While sweeping further toward shore, the task group was targeted by Iraqi fire control radars associated with Silkworm missile sites inside Kuwait. Task force ships moved out of Silkworm range and worked to locate the radar site. During those maneuvers on 18 February, Iraqi mines found their mark. Within three hours of each other, Tripoli and USS Princeton (CG 59) were rocked by exploding mines. As damage control teams successfully overcame fires and flooding aboard Tripoli and Princeton, Impervious, Leader and Avenger searched for additional mines in the area. Adroit led the salvage tug USS Beaufort (ATS 2) toward Princeton to tow her to safety.

Tripoli was able to continue her mission for several days before she was relieved by USS La Salle (AGF 3) and USS New Orleans (LPH 11) and proceeded to Bahrain for repairs. New Orleans provided the helicopter deck while the mine group staff moved aboard La Salle to coordinate the operation. Princeton restored her TLAM strike and AEGIS anti-air warfare defense capabilities within fifteen minutes of the mine strike, whereupon she reassumed duties as local anti-air warfare coordinator and remained on station, providing defense for the mine countermeasures group for an additional 30 hours, until relieved.

Charts and intelligence captured from Iraq showed the mine field where Tripoli and Princeton were hit was one of six laid in a 150-mile arc from Faylaka Island to the Saudi-Kuwaiti border. Within that arc, there were four additional mine-lines—a total of more than 1,000 mines—laid over a five-month period.

Three days later, the massive 31-ship amphibious task force moved north to assist in battlefield preparation as the deadline for the ground offensive neared. As Wisconsin and Missouri steamed in the vicinity of recently cleared "Point FOXTROT," their gun crews continued to pound Iraqi targets. Marine AV-8B Harriers launched from the flight deck of Nassau conducted strikes ashore.

Adroit had 34.9 years of service.

== Final decommissioning ==
Adroit was decommissioned 12 December 1991 and was stricken 8 May 1992. She was sold for scrap 15 April 1994 and scrapped at Wilmington, North Carolina, 30 May 1995.

In 1994, Wilmington, North Carolina became the site of a ship scrapping operation. There were twenty decommissioned U.S.NAVY warships and one maritime ship. Wilmington Resources, Inc., and Sigma Recycling, LLC, operated the facility. The USS ADROIT MSO 509 was dismantled and scrapped at this facility.
