= SS Rainbow =

SS Rainbow may refer to one of several Type C2 ships built for the United States Maritime Commission:

- SS Rainbow (1941) (MC hull number 124, Type C2-T), built by Tampa Shipbuilding; transferred to the United States Navy as Lassen-class ammunition ship USS Rainier (AE-5); scrapped in 1971
- SS Rainbow (1943) (MC hull number 1168, Type C2-S-B1), built by Moore Dry Dock; sold for commercial use under the name Virginia Lykes in 1947; scrapped in 1973
