= Rawan bint Najeeb Tawfeeqi =

Minister of Youth Affairs in the Kingdom of Bahrain

Rawan Najeeb Tawfiqi
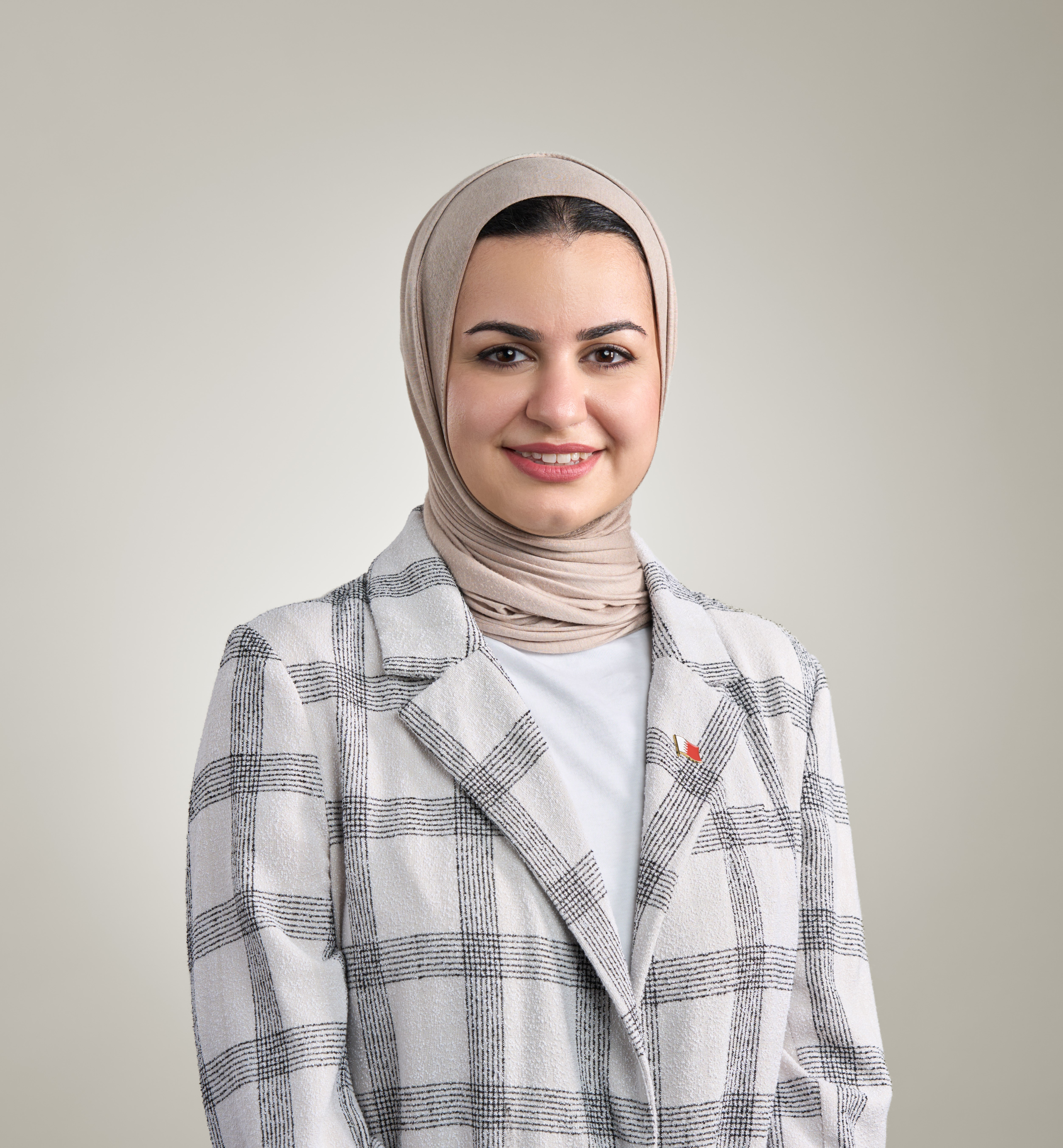

Minister of Youth Affairs
- Incumbent
- Assumed office November 21, 2022
- Monarch: His Majesty King Hamad bin Isa Alkhalifa
- Preceded by: Aymen Tawfeeq Almoayed

Rawan Najeeb Tawfeeqi is a Bahraini politician who has held the position of Minister of Youth Affairs since November 21, 2022.

Her Excellency Mrs. Rawan Bint Najeeb Tawfeeqi is considered one of the youth entrepreneurs in the Kingdom of Bahrain and has an active role in the process of upgrading this sector through her positive participation in many programs, plans and initiatives, which had a great impact on her success and reaching the goals for which she was found.

She was also among the top three in the national program ‘Lamea’, which aims to create promising youth leaders and a strong and rich base of competencies with integrated national awareness, to be qualified for excellence and hold leadership positions in many locations and fields.
