= Riffa =

City in Bahrain

Riffa الرفاع
- City
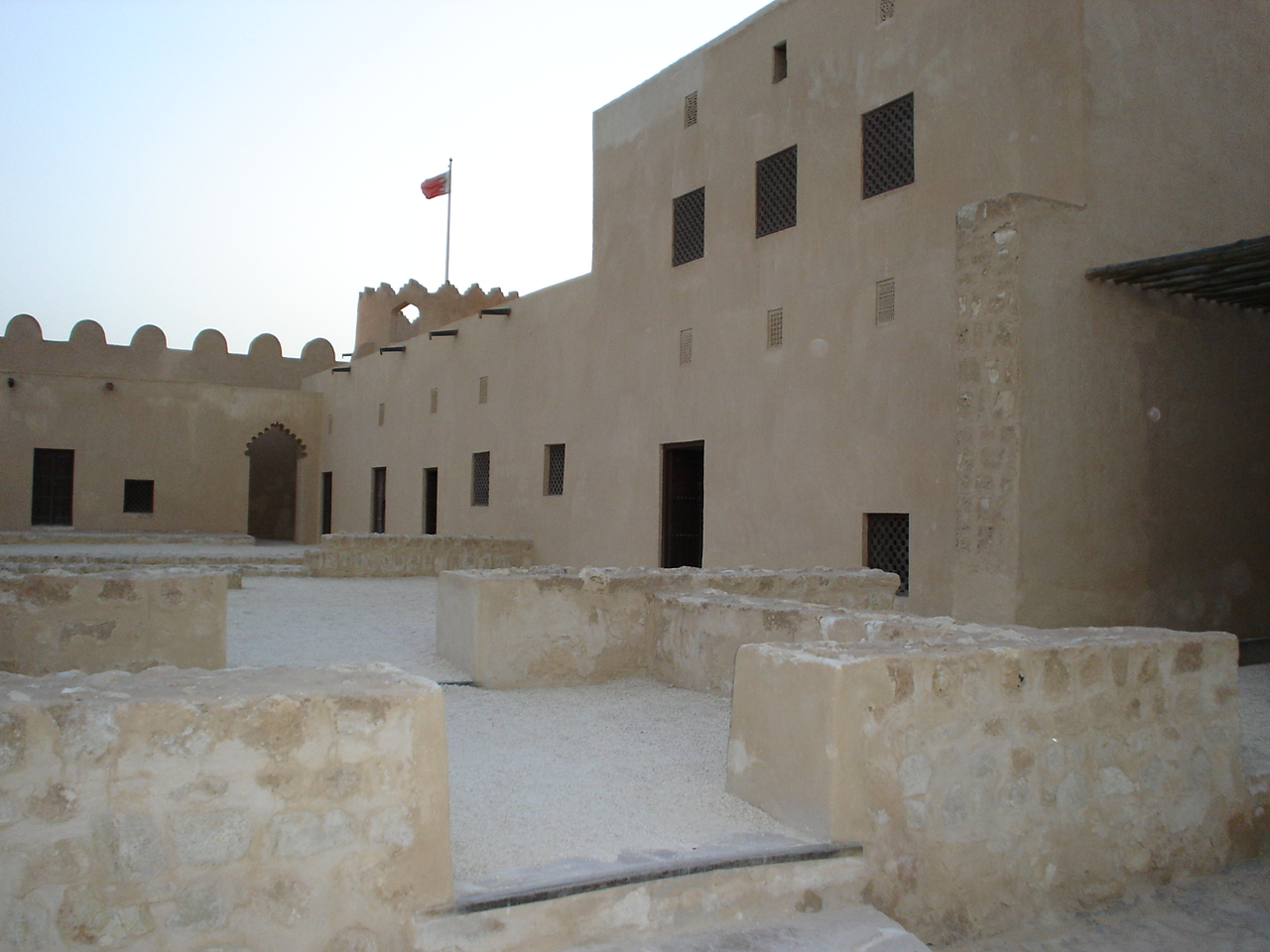
- Riffa Fort
- Nickname: رفاع العز Riffa Glory and History
- Location in Bahrain
- Coordinates: 26°7′48″N 50°33′18″E
- Country: Bahrain
- Governorate: Southern Governorate
- Settled: 1811

Government
  - Governor: His Highness Shaikh Khalifa bin Ali bin Khalifa Al Khalifa
  - Deputy Governor: Brigadier General Hamad Al Khayyat

Area
  - Land: 15.8 sq mi (41 km^{2})

Population (2012)
  - Total: 115,495
- Time zone: UTC + 3

Riffa (Arabic: الرفاع, romanized: Ar-Rifāʿ) is the second-largest city in the Kingdom of Bahrain in terms of area. The city is divided into three parts: East Riffa, West Riffa and North Riffa. All three parts are located in the Southern Governorate.

The city is growing fast: during the 2001 census, the population was recorded as 79,550, which was estimated at 111,000 by 2008.

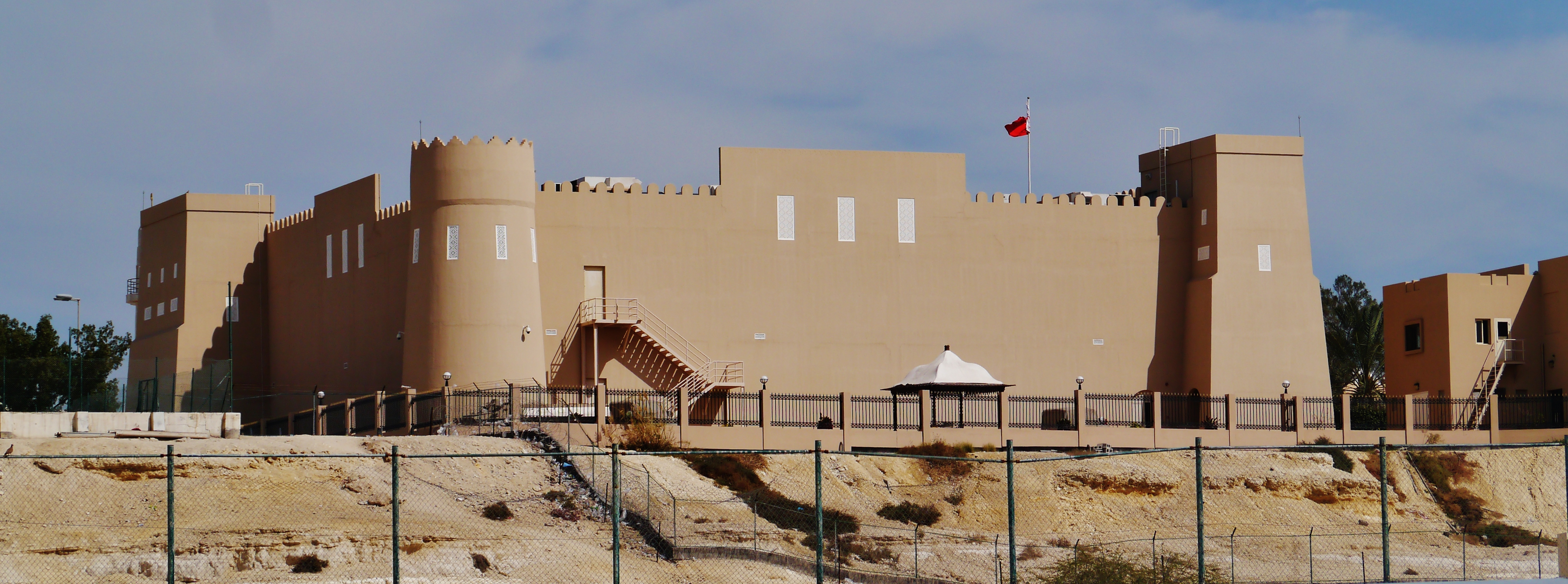
The military museum in Riffa.

== History ==
Riffa was formerly the principal settlement on Bahrain Island, before being supplanted by the port of Manama over the course of the 19th century.

== East Riffa ==
East Riffa has many attractions; one such attraction is the Bahrain National Stadium, along with a thriving restaurant scene. The city is also home to stores such as East Riffa Market and Carrefour Market, along with providing entertainment services such as Iron Man Gym and Gaga Zumba Hop. The city is also home to the Al Rayan Medical Complex Hospital. The city has several shopping malls and two main shopping streets; Riffa Market (سوق الرفاع, Souk ar-Rifa) and Bukuwara Street Market. The former is larger, while the latter is more organised and modernised. Playing golf in the Royal Golf Club is considered one of the top activities to do in the area.

Even though East Riffa has predominantly been an urban working class area, in recent times more people are relocating here due to East Riffa being one of the most affordable places to live in Bahrain, especially due to the government housing projects. The government built council houses in East Riffa and also built more council houses in neighboring towns like Isa Town, Hamad Town and Zayed Town. East Riffa is also becoming more popular with locals and expats due to the number of new developments and projects being launched, expanding its real estate market. A new development, created by Arcapita, called Riffa Views, is a large residential and commercial center. The project includes artificial lakes, an international school, commercial districts, supermarkets, and will have access to the recently opened Royal Women's University. Enma Mall and Lulu Hypermarket Mall are new additions to the rapidly increasing commercial centers in East Riffa.

East Riffa has previously been known as one of the most dangerous areas in Bahrain, particularly because of the political tension and unrest within Sunni-Shia clashes due to the sectarian conflict, along with anti-government protests and demonstrations where as many as hundreds of injuries would occur, some of those injuries even resulting in death, much like its neighboring village Ma'ameer. These clashes and protests dates back to the 1990s after the Gulf War, but received the most media coverage during the Arab Spring in 2011. However, in recent times unrest has simmered, and East Riffa is becoming one of the fastest-growing areas in Bahrain due to the number of new developments taking place in the area, making it more popular with locals and expats.

East Riffa is culturally diverse, housing a proportionally mixed Shia–Sunni population along with expats, unlike West Riffa where the majority of the population in West Riffa is Sunni due to the unwritten laws which establishes a quasi-apartheid regime that makes it much more difficult for Shias, along with Ibadis, to find housing in West Riffa. This has caused many Shias, along with Ibadis, to instead migrate to East Riffa where they can find available and affordable housing, which in turn has unfortunately caused political tension and unrest between Sunnis and Shias due to the sectarian conflict, along with sectarian polarization between Sunnis and Ibadis.

== West Riffa ==
West Riffa is predominantly a residential area. Most of the ruling family, ministers and business investors live in West Riffa. King Hamad bin Isa Al Khalifa of Bahrain lives there, as well as the former prime minister, Sheikh Khalifa bin Salman Al Khalifa who died in 2020. Riffa's famous clock tower is located in the centre of West Riffa. The majority of West Riffa's population is Sunni, unlike East Riffa which houses a more proportionally mixed Shia-Sunni population along with expats.

West Riffa also has various landmarks including the Riffa Palace, where the former rulers of Bahrain, Sheikh Salman bin Hamad and Shaikh Isa bin Salman Al Khalifa lived. West Riffa also is home to well-known springs, Al Hunaynya and Umm Ghwayfa, once considered to be Bahrain's purest and finest water. West Riffa is also home to one of the city's most iconic buildings known as the clock tower, as well as the Riffa Fort, which is also known as Sheikh Salman Bin Ahmad Al Fateh Fort.

== Notable people ==
- Hamad bin Isa Al Khalifa (born 1950), King of Bahrain
- Salman bin Hamad Al Khalifa (born 1969), Crown Prince and Prime Minister of Bahrain
- Nasser bin Hamad Al Khalifa (born 1987), Commander of Bahrain's Royal Guard, deputy chairman of the Higher Committee for Energy and Natural Resources, and the head of the government's Supreme Council for Youth and Sports
- Aymen Tawfeeq Almoayed (born 1982), diplomat
