= USS Tripoli (LPH-10) =

United States Navy amphibious assault ship

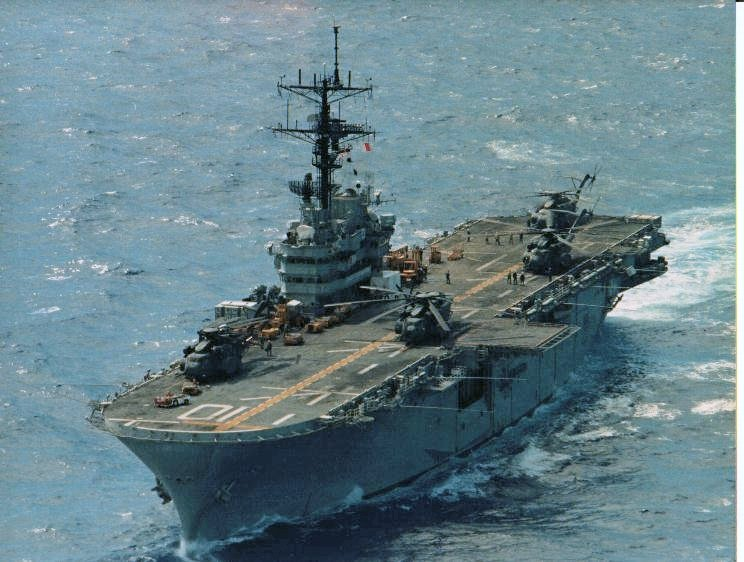
- USS Tripoli underway

History

United States
- Name: Tripoli
- Namesake: Battle of Derna
- Ordered: 10 December 1962
- Builder: Ingalls Shipbuilding
- Yard number: 1105
- Laid down: 15 June 1964
- Launched: 31 July 1965
- Completed: 20 July 1966
- Commissioned: 6 August 1966
- Decommissioned: 15 September 1995
- Stricken: 15 September 1995
- Identification: Callsign: NWQU; Hull number: LPH-10
- Motto: Semper Princeps; (Always First)
- Fate: Scrapped in 2018

General characteristics
- Class & type: Iwo Jima-class amphibious assault ship
- Displacement: 19,302 tons
- Length: 598 feet (182 m)
- Beam: 84 feet (26 m)
- Draught: 30 feet (9 m)
- Propulsion: 2 × 600 psi (4.1 MPa) boilers, one geared steam turbines, one shaft, 22,000 shaft horse power
- Speed: 23 knots (26 mph; 43 km/h)
- Complement: 718 (80 officer, 638 enlisted)
- Armament: Initially: 2 × 2 3-inch (76 mm) / 50 caliber as DP guns, 8 cell Sea Sparrow BPDMS launchers, Later: 2 × Phalanx CIWS
- Aircraft carried: 20 × CH-46 Sea Knight, 10 × MH-53E Sea Dragon, 3 × AH-1 Cobra

USS Tripoli (LPH-10), an Iwo Jima-class amphibious assault ship, was laid down on 15 June 1964 at Pascagoula, Mississippi, by the Ingalls Shipbuilding Corporation; launched on 31 July 1965; sponsored by Jane Cates, the wife of General Clifton B. Cates, former Commandant of the Marine Corps; and commissioned on 6 August 1966 at the Philadelphia Naval Shipyard. Tripoli was the second US Navy ship named for the Battle of Derna in 1805. It was the decisive victory of a mercenary army led by a detachment of US Marines and US Army soldiers against the forces of Tripoli during the First Barbary War and was the first recorded land battle of the United States fought overseas.

Following three months fitting out at Philadelphia, the ship put to sea on 6 November 1966, bound for the west coast. She transited the Panama Canal at mid-month and arrived at her home port, San Diego, on 22 November 1966. Final acceptance trials, shakedown training, and post-shakedown availability at Long Beach occupied the warship until she embarked Marine Heavy Helicopter Squadron HMH-463, elements of Marine Observation Squadron VMO-6, and some members of the staff of the Commander, Amphibious Squadron 8 on 1 May 1967 and departed San Diego, bound for the western Pacific.

== Vietnam Service, 1967–1973 ==
Tripoli served on three deployments to Vietnamese waters during the Vietnam War, participating in numerous operations.

=== First tour ===
Except for a round-trip voyage to Okinawa early in September, the ship operated out of US Naval Base Subic Bay, Republic of the Philippines for the remainder of her deployment. Main propulsion plant problems, however, continued to plague her. On the return trip, the ship went dead in the water not far to the northwest of Subic Bay. USS Beaufort went out and towed her into port. After repairs, Tripoli, occupied her remaining time in the Far East with amphibious exercises in the Philippines. On 11 December 1967, USS Okinawa relieved her as flagship of TG 76.4, and Tripoli headed for home. Tripoli arrived in San Diego on 23 December 1967 and remained there through the end of the year.

On 22 May 1967, Tripoli arrived in the combat zone off the coast of South Vietnam and disembarked HMH-463 and VMO-6 at Danang on the 23rd and 24th before joining TG 76.5, just then finishing up amphibious landing Operation Belt Tight in the I Corps zone just south of the Vietnamese Demilitarized Zone (DMZ) between North and South Vietnam. She headed for the Philippines on 25 May, arrived in Subic Bay on the 27th, and relieved USS Princeton as flagship of Amphibious Ready Group (ARG) Bravo VTG 76.5. In that capacity, she embarked not only the task group commander's staff but also the staff of the Commander, Special Landing Force (SLF) Bravo CTG 79.5, the 2nd Battalion, 3rd Marines, the men and aircraft of Marine Medium Helicopter Squadron HMM-164, Surgical Evacuation Team Bravo, and Detachment Bravo of Tactical Squadron (TacRon) 11. On 8 June, she departed Subic Bay for an extended tour of duty in Vietnamese waters.

During its 1967 deployment, Tripoli participated in eight amphibious operations, all conducted along the coast of the I Corps. Her first operation, codenamed Beacon Torch, began on 18 June when US Marines of SLF Bravo were flown into the vicinity of Hoi An, located on the coast midway between the DMZ and the southern limit of I Corps tactical zone. Between 18 June and 2 July, the Marines operated ashore, initially engaging an enemy force of about 100 men. After an air strike broke the enemy resistance, the Marines concluded their mission with a search and destroy sweep to wipe out the remnants of that force. All the while, Tripoli remained offshore providing logistic support, medical evacuation services for casualties and a platform from which to launch air support missions by the embarked Marine attack squadron. On 2 July, she received the special landing force back on board and immediately headed north to the coast of Quảng Trị Province to answer a call for assistance from Marine Corps units near Con Thien, which had suffered heavily from bombardments by the People's Army of Vietnam (PAVN). The ensuing Operation Beaver Track pitted SLF Bravo against the PAVN troops to relieve the pressure on Marine Corps units based ashore with the III Marine Amphibious Force (MAF). Simultaneously with Operation Beaver Track, SLF "Alfa", embarked on USS Okinawa, went ashore to engage the same enemy force in Operation Bear Claw. The two battalion landing teams joined III MAF Marines based ashore in a week-long struggle, followed by an eight-battalion search and destroy sweep. Throughout the 12 days of "Beaver Track/Bear Claw," Tripoli steamed offshore within easy helicopter range to provide logistical, medical, and ground support. The two landing forces were later credited with a third of the 1,100 PAVN casualties and with no small part in breaking up the PAVN attack.

"Beaver Track/Bear Claw" ended on 14 July, and both battalion landing teams returned to their ships on the 7th. The respite from combat, however, proved brief. At dawn three days later, Tripoli's Marines stormed ashore in a combined waterborne-airborne amphibious assault on the exposed seaward flank of the Viet Cong (VC) 806th Battalion near Quảng Trị City. The VC avoided contact with the Marines by retiring hastily to the west, where they were badly mauled by South Vietnamese troops. BLT 2/3 re-embarked in Tripoli on the 27th for another brief rest before the equally brief amphibious Operation Kangaroo Kick, which commenced on 1 August. Tripoli's Marines landed in Quảng Trị Province, north of Hue. Though the operation ended only three days later, the Marines did not re-embark for the voyage to Subic Bay. Instead, they changed operational control to III MAF, while Tripoli and the rest of TG 76.5 spent two weeks at the Philippine naval base for upkeep.

Tripoli returned to the Vietnamese coast near Huế on the 20th and backloaded SLF Bravo in time for the Marines to participate in Operation Belt Drive. On 27 August, the battalion landing team once more went ashore, via both helicopter and landing craft, in Quang Tri Province. PAVN/VC resistance proved slight; and, after a three-day sweep of the Hai Lang forest, the Marines reembarked in Tripoli on 5 September. That same day, USS Dupont suffered a hit from enemy guns on Cape Lay, North Vietnam. Tripoli, located not far away, went to her assistance and evacuated 12 casualties by helicopter for treatment on board the ship. On the 17th, because her entire complement of CH-46A Sea Knight helicopters had been grounded, Tripoli launched the first all-boat landing from an LPH. In spite of swells 8–12 feet (2.4–3.7 m) high, a rain squall, 30- to 40-knot (46 mph; 74 km/h) winds, and visibility frequently less than 0.5 miles (0.80 km), the boat landings for Operation Fortress Sentry came off almost without a hitch. Ashore near the Cua Viet River some 7 miles (11 km) south of the DMZ, the Marines moved inland, but encountered no enemy resistance until the 23d. Then, artillery and air support quickly extinguished the PAVN's will to fight, and the operation was terminated on the 25th. The Marines reembarked between 25 September and 27 September, and the task group headed back to Subic Bay for six days in port. Tripoli returned to Vietnam at Danang early in October and loaded 39 defective CH-46A helicopters for transportation to Okinawa, where their tail pylons were to be replaced. Shortly after she departed Danang on 7 October, her lookout spied an Air Force F-105 Thunderchief, which crashed into the sea about 2 miles (3.2 km) ahead. One of her helicopters flew to the scene, rescued the pilot, and returned him to the ship for medical treatment. Not long thereafter, her lookouts caught sight of a second survivor of the crash. By the time her helicopter arrived on the scene, an Air Force chopper had already picked up the man. Tripoli's helicopter assisted in the operation by taking on board the Air Force crewman who had jumped in to assist the survivor into the lift harness.

Tripoli returned from the Ryukyus Islands (Japan) to Vietnamese waters at mid-month. On the 17th, CH-53 Sea Stallion helicopters carried the battalion landing team to a point 10 miles (16 km) south of Phu Bai Combat Base in Thừa Thiên Province. The following day, the Marines changed operational control to III MAF ashore for a search and destroy sweep along Route 1. Meanwhile, Tripoli supplied logistic support until she cleared Vietnamese waters on 1 November, bound for Okinawa with another 18 defective CH-46A helicopters. After brief stops at Okinawa and Subic Bay, the ship returned to Danang on 10 November. After re-embarking SLF "Bravo," she prepared for her last amphibious operation of the deployment, Operation Badger Hunt. On the 14th, the landing force was lifted some 25 miles (40 km) inland to the area near An Hoa Combat Base in Quảng Nam Province. After silencing sporadic enemy resistance near the landing site, Tripoli's Marines joined elements of the shore-based 7th Marines in a successful search-and-destroy operation. Tripoli supported the landing force through the end of the operation on the 27th, when the Marines returned to the ship. She entered Danang on the 29th and began transferring the Marines of the battalion landing team and their supporting elements to USS Valley Forge. The next day, 30 November, Valley Forge relieved Tripoli as flagship, TG 76.5; and Tripoli got underway to return to the United States via Okinawa and Yokosuka, Japan. She arrived in San Diego on 23 December 1967, and began post-deployment standdown.

Tripoli completed a restricted availability at Long Beach between late January and the end of March 1968. During the first three weeks of April, she conducted a series of individual ship exercises and then rounded out the month with amphibious training. From 6 to 17 May, the ship conducted refresher training and then returned to San Diego to prepare for her second WestPac deployment. On 12 June 1968, the ship stood out of San Diego on her way to the Far East. She stopped briefly at Pearl Harbor, Hawaii and at Okinawa before arriving at Subic Bay on 1 July. Between the 2nd and the 5th, she embarked the 2nd Battalion, 7th Marines, HMM-265, Detachment Bravo of TacRon 13 and other supporting units of the ARG "Bravo." On the 6th, she departed Subic Bay and arrived the following day in the Vietnam combat zone.

=== Second tour ===
Tripoli's second tour of duty closely followed the pattern of the first. During the next seven months, she patrolled the coast of South Vietnam near the I Corps tactical in a position to launch her landing contingent quickly whenever they were needed by Marine Corps, Army and South Vietnamese forces operating ashore. The first of her eight amphibious operations came the day after she arrived in the combat zone. Following preliminary naval bombardment, Operation Eager Yankee opened with a combined airborne and waterborne assault. The Marines of SLF Bravo went ashore about 10 miles (16 km) east of Phu Bai Combat Base. They then wheeled right and pressed north toward a known VC haven. The VC avoided contact; and, on the 16th, the Marines joined shore-based forces in Operation Houston IV. That operation ended on 22 July, and the battalion landing team returned to the ship the same day.

While Tripoli proceeded to the scene of a new operation, feverish preparations allowed her to send SLF Bravo ashore again just 17 hours after the completion of reembarkation. For Operation Swift Play, the Marines rode helicopters ashore to an area about 10 miles (16 km) southwest of An Hoa, deep inland in Quảng Nam Province. The assault forces spotted several enemy formations, but no engagements resulted. The following day, BLT 2/7 transferred to the control of III MAF to conclude an operation designed to parry a major enemy thrust toward Danang. The landing force remained ashore operating under the commanding general, 1st Marine Division, in defense of Danang through the months of August, September and November. Meanwhile, Tripoli steamed on station offshore providing logistics and medical support, departing Vietnamese waters twice between 22 July and 5 November. In mid-August, she steamed to Subic Bay for repairs; and, in early October, she voyaged via Subic Bay to Kaohsiung, Taiwan, for a liberty call. During all other periods, she remained off the Vietnamese coast providing support services to the Marines of BLT 2/7 operating ashore.

On 5 November, the special landing force ended more than three months of combat duty ashore and re-embarked on Tripoli. Five days later, HMM-165's helicopters and Tripoli's landing craft carried the Marines ashore once again. In Operation Daring Endeavor, the Marines located, closed with and destroyed enemy fortifications and captured large quantities of rice. They concluded the action on the 17th and returned to the ship that same day. Three days later, Tripoli launched her fourth landing, another combined waterborne and airborne operation directed at an area in Quảng Nam Province, just south of Danang. During Operation Swift Move, initial opposition proved very light; and the landing force quickly transferred to the control of the 1st Marine Division for further action ashore in the continued defense of Danang against PAVN and Vietcong forces. Tripoli continued support activities for the battalion landing team until 3 December when she offloaded what remained aboard of the Marines' equipment at Danang, in preparation for departing Vietnam for a liberty call in Hong Kong. After a five-day visit, she continued on to Subic Bay for a two-week availability. On 27 December 1968, she headed back to Danang. On 1 January 1969, she embarked BLT 3rd Battalion, 26th Marines and HMM-164 to reconstitute SLF "Bravo."

During the remainder of her second tour of duty, Tripoli participated in two more amphibious operations. The first of these, Operation Bold Mariner, was hailed as the largest such maneuver since the Allied landings during World War II. Aimed at the Batangan Peninsula of Quảng Ngãi Province, where the entire population was considered hostile, the operation sought to cordon off the peninsula and trap the 300 or so Vietcong operating there. Both special landing forces "Alfa" and "Bravo," joined South Vietnamese troops and soldiers of the US Army's Americal Division in forming the cordon. Following a feint near Mo Duc, the amphibious force headed for the real landing area. Navy guns softened the objective beaches, and the Marines went ashore on 13 January, many by helicopter. Marines from Company H, 2nd Battalion, 26th Marines went ashore in landing craft, M-Boats carried platoons and reinforced companies which landing on the beach forming the east side of the cordon. While the operation continued, Tripoli remained offshore providing her Marines with the ever-needed logistical support and medical facilities. By 6 February, the soldiers and Marines ashore had thoroughly combed the peninsula for VC troops, so BLT 3/26 turned the mop-up operation over to the American and South Vietnamese soldiers and returned to the ship.

The re-embarkation of the Marines was completed by 9 February, just in time for Tripoli to launch her last amphibious operation of the deployment. The expected enemy Tet 1969 offensive required South Vietnamese troops to be withdrawn from Operation Taylor Common, then in progress near An Hoa in Quang Nam Province. SLF Bravo was to replace those troops in Operation Defiant Measure. The landings began at 08:00 on the morning of 10 February, and the offloading of men and equipment continued for several days. Tripoli remained in the area until the 16th. Operation Defiant Measure was concluded on that day, though the Marines remained ashore to continue Operation Taylor Common. HMM-164 was disembarked before Tripoli began her voyage home. She departed Vietnam that same day, and arrived in Subic Bay on the 18th. There, she turned over her duties to USS Valley Forge. On the 22nd, she got underway for badly needed repairs in Yokosuka, Japan, and before continuing on to the United States. She finally arrived back in San Diego on 19 March and began post-deployment standdown.

Tripoli remained on the west coast until November. After leave and upkeep, she began an availability period at the San Diego yard of the National Steel Company, which continued until 11 August. Following refresher training in September and amphibious training in October, she stood out of San Diego on 1 November to return to the Far East. After a brief stop at Guam on the 15th for fuel, she continued on to Danang, South Vietnam, arriving five days later.

=== Third tour ===
During Tripoli's third deployment to the western Pacific, the combat operations along the Vietnamese coast, which had characterized her first two deployments were totally absent. Instead, she conducted a series of amphibious training exercises and a series of "Keystone" operations redeploying Marine Corps units. Her first mission, Operation Keystone Cardinal, began on 20 November 1969 when she loaded the Marines and equipment of BLT 3rd Battalion, 4th Marines for transportation to Okinawa. At Okinawa between 24 November and 2 December, she disembarked BLT 3/4 and embarked BLT 2/9, HMM-165, and supporting units to constitute SLP "Alfa." On 2 December, she departed Okinawa bound for the Philippines. She conducted upkeep at Subic Bay between 5 December and 12 December and two amphibious exercises at Zambales on the 13th and 14th.

Tripoli returned to Vietnamese waters on the 17th and cruised the area without incident until the 25th, when she headed back to Subic Bay. In the Philippines, minor repairs and more amphibious exercises occupied her until 6 January 1970. She made a six-day cruise to Vietnam and then returned to the Philippines on the 12th for more training. On the 25th, she disembarked SLF "Alfa" at Subic Bay in preparation for a voyage to Vietnam to pick up homeward-bound marines. She entered Danang on 31 January and began embarking personnel from HQ, III MAF, 1st Marine Air Wing, 1st Marine Division, and III MAF Logistics Command. Later that evening, she got underway for home. After a non-stop voyage of 17 days, the ship arrived in San Diego on 16 February. She moved to Long Beach on the 23d to replace a cracked screw and departed that port on the 27th to return to the western Pacific reaching Subic Bay on 15 March.

Tripoli operated in the Philippines and at Okinawa conducting amphibious exercises in preparation for an exercise with units of South Korean forces. She arrived in Korean waters on 18 April and, two days later, began Operation Golden Dragon. The combined American-South Korean amphibious exercise lasted until the 25th. Tripoli returned to Okinawa on the 27th. She briefly operated off Danang at the end of the first week in May and then visited Hong Kong for a week in mid-month. Late in May, she returned via Subic Bay to Okinawa to disembark SLF "Alfa" and then moved to Danang, where she disembarked ComPhibRon 9 and his staff and took on cargo for the voyage home. Tripoli got underway on 7 June 1970 and reached San Diego on the 24th. Tripoli spent the next 15 months on the west coast. Following post-deployment' upkeep and local operations, she conducted carrier qualifications in the southern California operation area in August and an amphibious exercise off Camp Pendleton. For the remainder of 1970, the ship occupied herself with individual ship's exercises and upkeep in preparation for an overhaul, which began on 1 February 1971. She left Hunters Point on 1 June, fully revitalized, and returned to San Diego on the 3rd to prepare for refresher training, which took place in late June and early July. Amphibious refresher training filled the latter half of July. She made two brief training cruises during the first week in August: one with NROTC midshipmen embarked and the other with Marine Corps reservists on board. Local operations and preparations for her fourth WestPac deployment occupied the rest of August and the entire month of September. On 1 October, Tripoli stood out of San Diego bound for the Far East. After stops at Pearl Harbor and Okinawa, she arrived in Subic Bay on the 28th.

The ship conducted amphibious training operations in the Philippines and made port visits to such places as Keelung and Kaohsiung in Taiwan and Sasebo, Japan. During her return from Sasebo to Subic Bay, she received orders to deploy to the Indian Ocean with TF-74, a special contingency task force built around USS Enterprise in response to the Indo-Pakistani War, which erupted on 3 December. The ship remained in the Indian Ocean for the duration of the brief war. The fighting ended on 15 December; and, two days later, Pakistan officially accepted the loss of its eastern provinces, which became the independent nation, Bangladesh. Tripoli remained with TF 74 in the Indian Ocean and the Bay of Bengal until early 1972.

She returned to Subic Bay on 14 January and resumed training operations punctuated by visits to Singapore, Hong Kong and Kobe, Japan. She began operations in Vietnamese waters at the beginning of April, operating on Yankee Station to provide search-and-rescue and medical evacuation services. She departed the combat zone twice, once for upkeep at Subic Bay and later to exchange battalion landing teams at Okinawa. At the end of June, she resumed flight operations in connection with troop movements. However, instead of carrying embarked Marines inland for amphibious landings, her helicopters moved South Vietnamese troops from point to point ashore. On 29 June, Tripoli-assigned helicopters helped to transport 1,400 Vietnamese Marines from Tam My to the vicinity of Quang Tri City during the allied counteroffensive to recapture areas of the I Corps tactical zone, which had been overrun by PAVN during the Easter Offensive. As this operation, codenamed "Lam Son 72" progressed, Tripoli remained off shore, evacuating casualties and waiting should the reserves be required. That necessity came shortly before noon on 11 July, when her helicopters helped to insert the reserve Vietnamese Marines battalion, picking them up near Route 553 and landing them behind enemy lines, about 1.5 miles (2.4 km) north-northwest of Quang Tri City. On the 20th, Tripoli departed Vietnamese waters bound for the Philippines where heavy monsoons had caused extensive flooding. She reached Subic Bay on 23 July and conducted relief operations until 4 August, at which time she set course for the United States.

Tripoli arrived at San Diego on 20 August and, remained there until 10 October. After a six-day amphibious exercise near Hunter Liggett Point, Tripoli returned to home port, where she stayed through the end of the year. During the first two months of 1973, she operated out of San Diego and prepared to deploy to the Far East once more. Tripoli stood out of San Diego on 6 March for her fifth deployment to the western Pacific. Steaming via Pearl Harbor, where she made a three-week stop for repairs to her high-pressure turbine, she arrived in Subic Bay on 17 April. The ship remained there and, when not plagued by material casualties to her main propulsion plant, conducted training preparatory to Operation End Sweep, the removal of American mines from North Vietnamese waters. Though scheduled to sail for Haiphong on 16 June, she was delayed by more problems in her propulsion plant. Nevertheless, early the next morning, Tripoli headed for North Vietnam and arrived at Haiphong on the 19th. The clearing of US mines in North Vietnamese waters, particularly Haiphong, was the last remaining precondition to the release of the US prisoners of war. That morning, the commander of TF 78, Rear Admiral Brian McCauley, embarked on the Tripoli and began negotiations with North Vietnamese representatives over the conduct of Operation End Sweep. McCauley spent his childhood in China and spoke fluent Chinese as the son of Commodore Cleaveland McCauley, who was military attache to China in the 1920s, and the negotiations were conducted in Chinese. Meanwhile, Tripoli's embarked air group began providing logistics support and inter-ship transportation services.

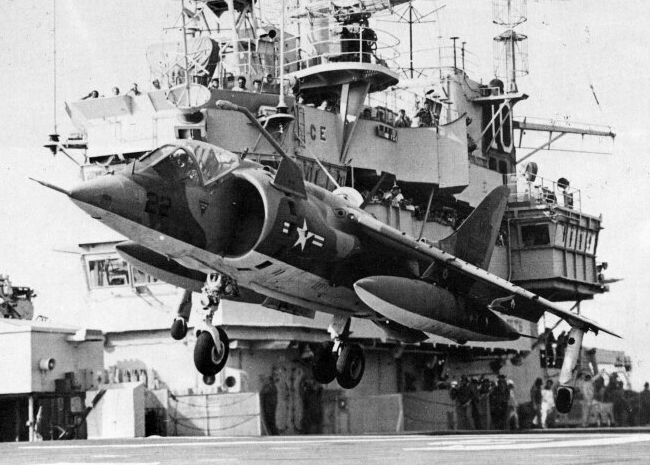
A Hawker Siddeley Harrier takes off from Tripoli in 1974.

Major issues in the negotiations were resolved by 28 June, and minesweeping operations began early that morning. Throughout the operation, the ship provided a platform for helicopters engaged both in minesweeping operations and for those providing logistics and transport services. Periodically, she retired from the area to replenish and to evade typhoons. Otherwise, she remained in the minesweeping area until 18 July when it departed North Vietnamese waters in company with USS Inchon and USS Ogden, bound for Luzon. Four days after her arrival back in Subic Bay, the last American operation in Vietnamese territory ended, and the End Sweep task force was dissolved. Operations reverted to CTG 76.5/ARG "Bravo." That organization lasted only two days because on the 27th, the Commander, PhibRon 1, broke his flag on Tripoli, and she became flagship for TG 76.4/ ARC "Alfa."

== Operational readiness, 1974–1979 ==
Between January 1974 and the end of 1976, Tripoli made two relatively routine deployments to the western Pacific. The first lasted from late July 1974 until late January 1975. During that time period, she operated out of Subic Bay and engaged primarily in amphibious training exercises in the Philippines. The second deployment, from mid-February to late October 1976, saw a repetition of this routine, but also included a voyage to Guam for disaster relief duty as a result of Super Typhoon Pamela. She also participated in two joint American-Korean amphibious exercises conducted near Pohang, Korea, in March and June, respectively. The second deployment ended on 25 October, when she arrived in San Diego, remaining there into 1977.

The first six months of 1977 were spent in a Planned Restricted Availability (PRAV) at Naval Station San Diego, for the purpose of increasing propulsion reliability during the next deployment. While the PRAV concluded on 28 June, it was necessary to tow Tripoli to the Long Beach Naval Shipyard to use the yard's extensive facilities for the reinstallation of Tripoli's low pressure turbine. The work was completed on 26 July; and, following successful sea trials, Tripoli returned to San Diego on 28 July. Succeeding months were spent in refresher training and workup for the ship's forthcoming deployment to the western Pacific. On 3 November, Tripoli departed San Diego. Chopping to control by the Commander, 7th Fleet, on 25 November, the ship spent the next seven months in WestPac, returning to San Diego on 22 July 1978. Following post-deployment standdown, Tripoli received an inspection by the Naval Board of Inspection and Survey in September. On 16 October, the ship commenced a three-month PRAV in preparation for a scheduled deployment to the western Pacific in 1979.

With the Vietnam War over, Tripoli was kept operationally ready through countless drills, exercises and maritime deployments. The Pacific Fleet introduction of the AV-8A Harrier occurred between 17 June and 13 August 1974. Also in 1974, after proving that she could handle Harrier flight operations, Tripoli became the first amphibious warfare ship to carry a full squadron of AV-8s.

== 1980s ==
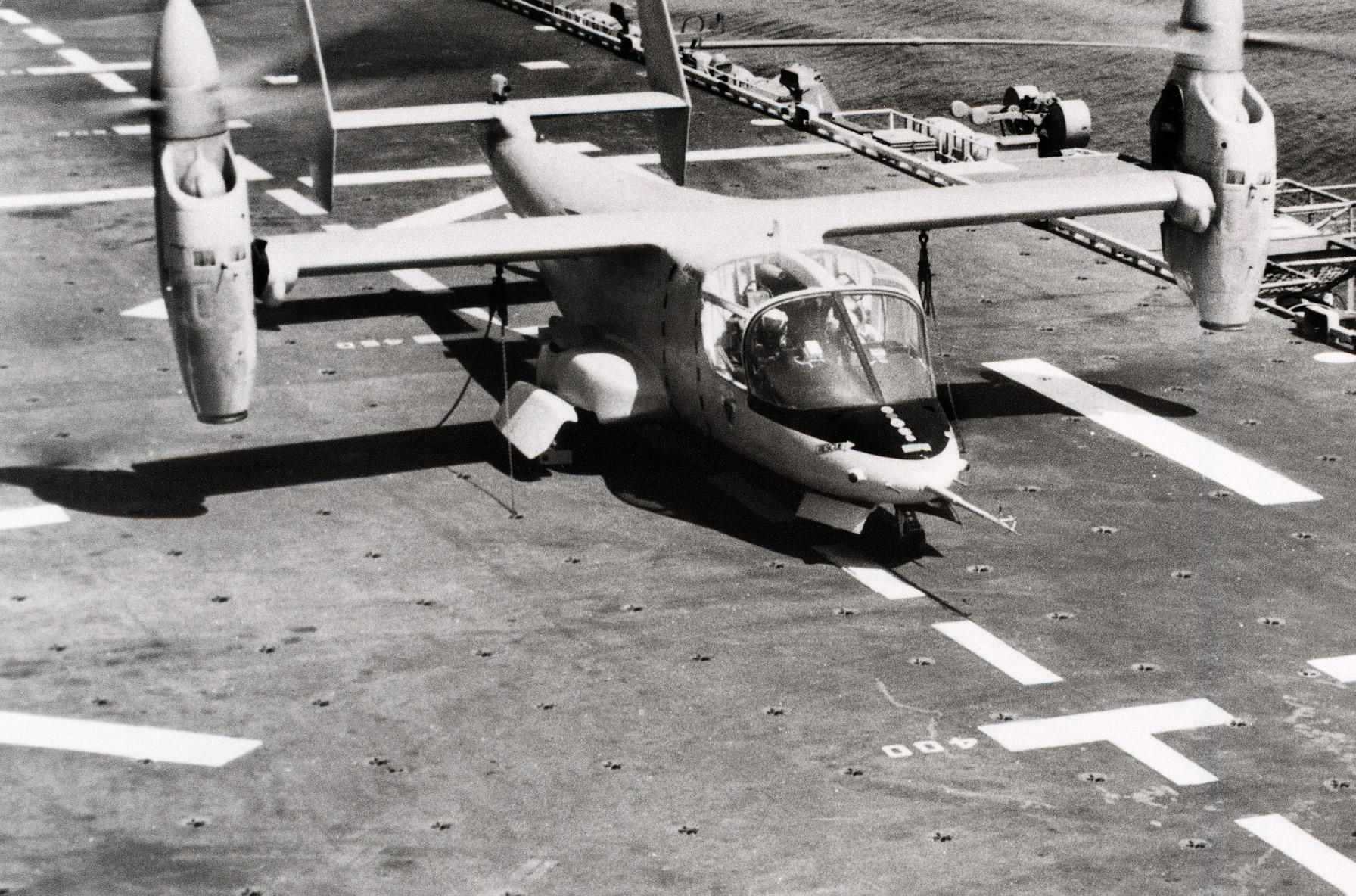
The experimental Bell XV-15 aboard Tripoli in 1983

Tripoli sailed on 12 November 1981 from San Diego for a western Pacific and Indian Ocean deployment as flagship of Amphibious Ready Group Alpha/Amphibious Squadron One (USS Duluth, USS Mount Vernon, USS Fresno) during which USS Tripoli and Amphibious Squadron One visited Perth and Fremantle, in Western Australia for R&R from 28 January to 3 February 1982. Tripoli returned home to San Diego, on 15 May 1982.

In 1982, the ship was the test platform for the XV-15 experimental tilt-rotor aircraft, the precursor of the V-22 Osprey.

== Stationed in the Arabian Sea, 1990–1995 ==
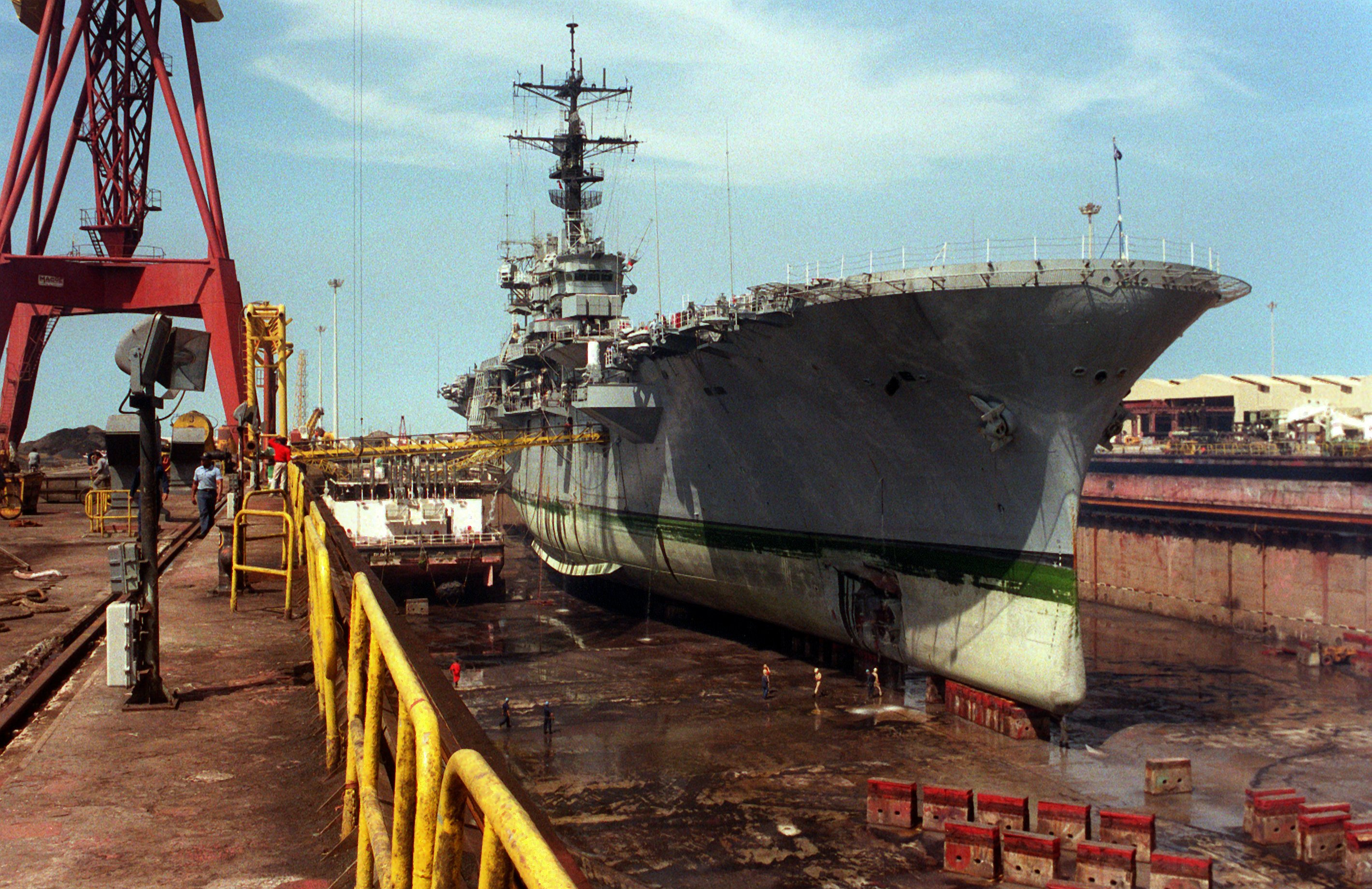
Tripoli in drydock after hitting an Iraqi naval mine

In 1990, Iraqi President Saddam Hussein became the focal point of international interest when, on 2 August his troops invaded Kuwait. Over 100 US Naval ships were sent in response, and on 1 December 1990, Tripoli was sent into action once again. Tripoli proceeded into the northern Persian Gulf and assumed duties as flagship for airborne mine countermeasures operations there with HM-14 and Marine Light Attack Helicopter Squadron 773 (HMLA-773) deployed aboard. On the morning of 18 February 1991, at 04:36 Tripoli was rocked by a LUGM-145 mine explosion on her starboard bow. The explosion ripped a 16 by 20 ft hole in the ship's hull. After 20 hours of damage control, the ship was stabilized and was actually ready to resume operations. However, her JP5 fuel tanks were damaged by the mine hit and she was unable to deploy her MH-53E Seadragons due to a lack of fuel. Tripoli remained on station for seven days before finally setting course for Jubail to allow HM-14 to crossdeck to the USS New Orleans and then to Bahrain's Arab Shipbuilding and Repair Yard Company. After 30 days of quick repairs, Tripoli returned to the Persian Gulf where she spearheaded the U.N. mine sweeping operation to clear the naval mine fields laid down by Iraq.

USS Impervious and sister MSO's were her escorts. Impervious was responsible for removing these mines that threatened the Tripoli. Soon after the Iraqi invasion, it became clear that Iraq was laying mines in international waters. US ships discovered and destroyed six mines during December. The US Mine Countermeasures Group (USMCMG) was established with the objective of clearing a path to the beach for a possible amphibious landing and battleship gunfire support.

The minesweepers USS Adroit, Impervious and USS Leader, along with the newly commissioned mine countermeasures ship USS Avenger, arrived in the Persian Gulf aboard the heavy-lift ship Super Servant III. More than 20 Navy Explosive Ordnance Disposal (EOD) teams were also deployed to support the mine countermeasures force. Allied minesweepers from Saudi Arabia, Great Britain and Kuwait, and the MH-53E Sea Dragons of Mine Countermeasures Helicopter Squadron 14 joined the mine countermeasure effort.

After months of training off Dubai, United Arab Emirates, USMCMG staff embarked on Tripoli on 20 January, and proceeded to the northern part of the Persian Gulf waters to perform their mission. As flagship for the combined operation, Tripoli's flight deck was the base for the mine-sweeping helicopters. Six British minesweepers joined their US counterparts, with UK and US warships providing air defense.

USMCMG began its work 60 miles (97 km) east of the Kuwaiti coastline, working initially to clear a 15 miles (24 km) long, 1,000 yards (910 m) wide path. The mine-clearing task force spent the first few weeks of Desert Storm pushing 24 miles (39 km) to Point Foxtrot, a 10 miles (16 km) by 3.5 miles (5.6 km) box, which became the battleship gunfire support area south of Faylaka Island. While sweeping further toward shore, the task group was targeted by Iraqi fire control radars associated with Silkworm missile sites inside Kuwait. Task force ships moved out of Silkworm range and worked to locate the radar site. During those maneuvers on 18 February, Iraqi mines found their mark. Within three hours of each other, Tripoli and USS Princeton were rocked by exploding mines. As damage control teams successfully overcame fires and flooding aboard Tripoli and Princeton, Impervious, Leader, and Avenger searched for additional mines in the area. Adroit led the salvage tug USS Beaufort toward Princeton to tow her to safety.

Tripoli was able to continue her mission for several days, until she was relieved by USS La Salle and USS New Orleans and proceeded to Bahrain for repairs. New Orleans provided the helicopter deck while the mine group staff moved aboard La Salle to coordinate the operation. Princeton restored her TLAM strike and AEGIS anti-air warfare defense capabilities within fifteen minutes of the mine strike, whereupon she reassumed duties as local anti-air warfare coordinator and remained on station, providing defense for the mine countermeasures group for an additional 30 hours, until relieved. Charts and intelligence captured from Iraq showed the mine field where Tripoli and Princeton were hit was one of six laid in a 150 miles (240 km) arc from Faylaka Island to the Saudi-Kuwaiti border. Within that arc, there were four additional mine lines—a total of more than 1,000 mines—laid over a five-month period. Three days later, the massive 31-ship amphibious task force moved north to assist in battlefield preparation as the deadline for the ground offensive neared. As Wisconsin and Missouri steamed in the vicinity of recently cleared Point Foxtrot, their gun crews continued to hit Iraqi targets. Marine AV-8B Harriers launched from the flight deck of Nassau conducted strikes ashore. Three crewmen received Bronze Stars, three others received Silver Stars and the ship was awarded the Combat Action Ribbon for exceptional performance during the incident.

When Somali warlords controlled the city of Mogadishu, Tripoli was ordered to respond. On 3 December 1992, Tripoli arrived off the coast of Somalia and conducted the first landing of forces in support of Operation Restore Hope. During the night landing, Tripoli's Marines were able to secure the airport and seaports in Mogadishu.

When Iraqi President Saddam Hussein began to redeploy his forces along the border of Kuwait in late 1994, Tripoli was sent as the initial show of force. Assuming duties with other ships in the northern Persian Gulf, Tripoli prepared to conduct amphibious operations in response to any further southward movement by Iraqi forces. Operation Vigilant Warrior resulted in the withdrawal of Hussein's forces from Kuwait's border.

== Decommissioning ==
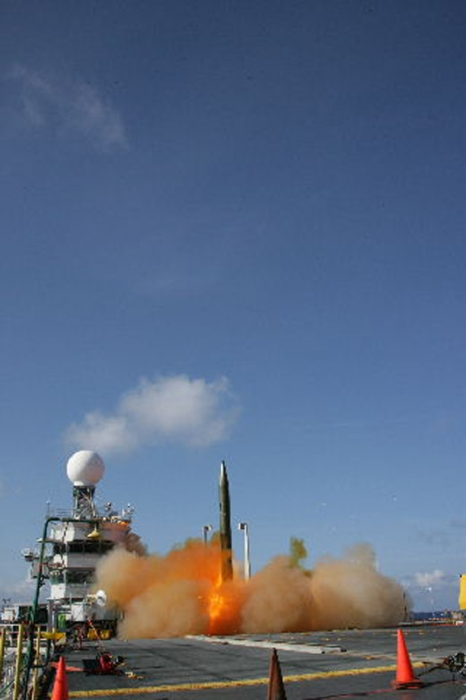
Ex-Tripoli used as a launch platform

Tripoli was decommissioned in 1995 and as of 2004, she was on loan to the US Army, but remained laid up at Mare Island Naval Shipyard. In December 2006, the ship was towed to Pearl Harbor, Hawaii, where she had a high-tech role as a launch platform with the United States' developing ballistic missile defense program. Three times the ship was towed some 100 miles (160 km) off shore and used to launch small ballistic missiles, which were then intercepted by Terminal High Altitude Area Defense Missiles, test-fired from the Pacific Missile Range Facility. The last test in the series was performed 26 October, when the ship fired a "Scud-like" missile, which was successfully intercepted. The ship was towed back to the San Francisco Bay Area for the winter. As the Hawaiian island of Kauaʻi lacked a suitable land-based launch site, and the costs of building one would far exceed the approximately $600,000 per year it costs to use the old warship, so the vessel returned to Pearl Harbor for a second series of tests in late spring 2008. In March 2015, the ship was towed back through the Panama Canal and stored with the Beaumont Reserve Fleet. In August 2016 the US Maritime Administration designated her for disposal. In July 2018, Tripoli was towed from Beaumont to Brownsville, Texas, for scrapping by European Metal Recycling.

== Awards ==
- Joint Meritorious Unit Award
- Navy Unit Commendation with 4 awards
- Combat Action Ribbon with 5 awards
- Navy Meritorious Unit Commendation
- Navy Battle "E" Ribbon with 2 awards
- National Defense Service Medal
- Vietnam Service Medal with 9 awards
- Armed Forces Expeditionary Medal
- Southwest Asia Service Medal
- Humanitarian Service Medal
- Philippines Presidential Unit Citation
- Republic of Vietnam Meritorious Unit Citation with 8 awards
- Vietnam Campaign Medal

== Gallery ==
USS Tripoli Lifecycle

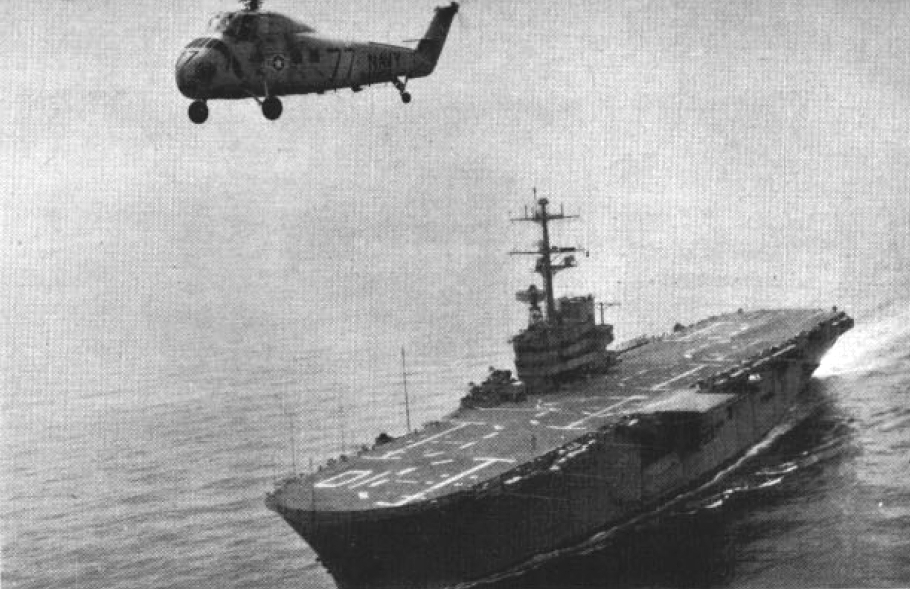
USS Tripoli during trials in the Gulf of Mexico, accompanied by a Sikorsky H-34 helicopter.

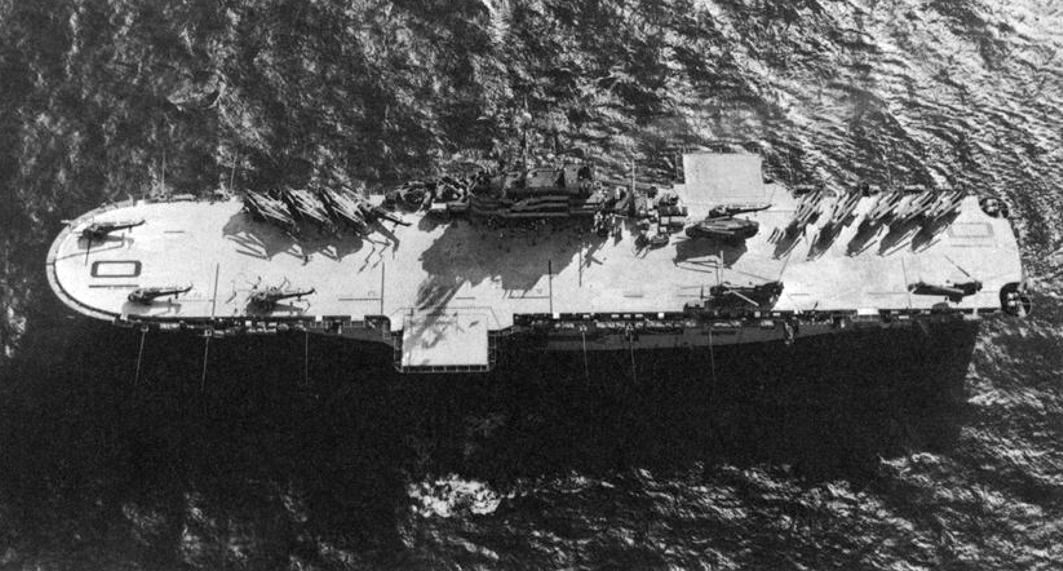
Aerial view of Tripoli underway in 1967

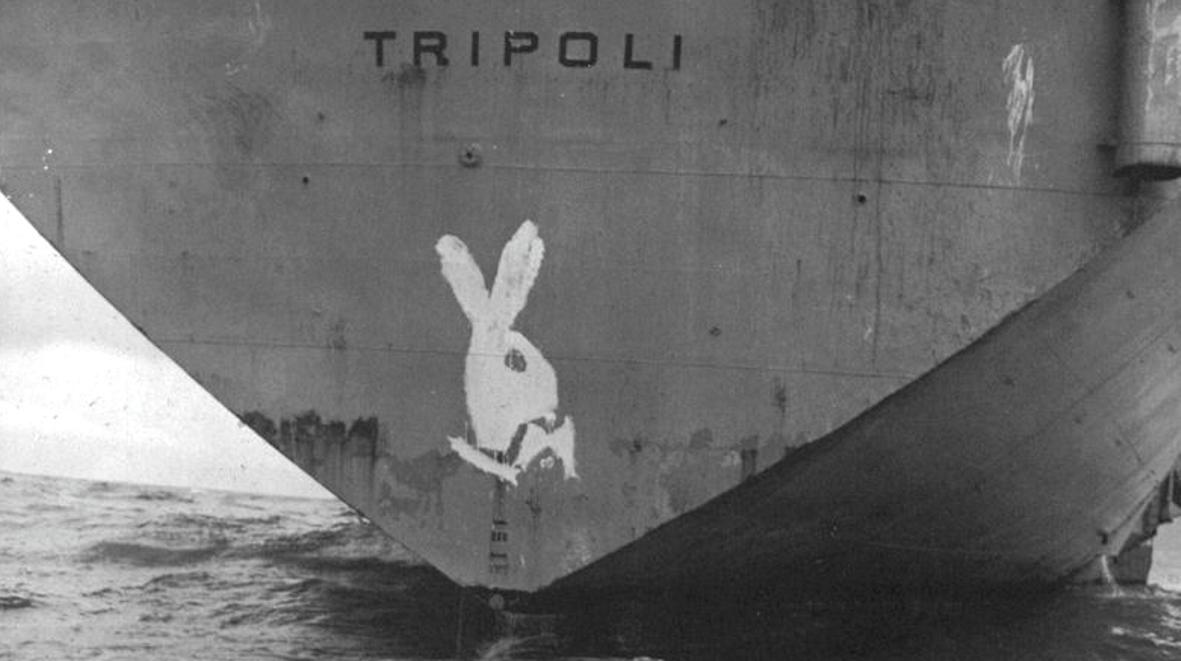
Playboy Bunny painted on the stern of Tripoli in 1967

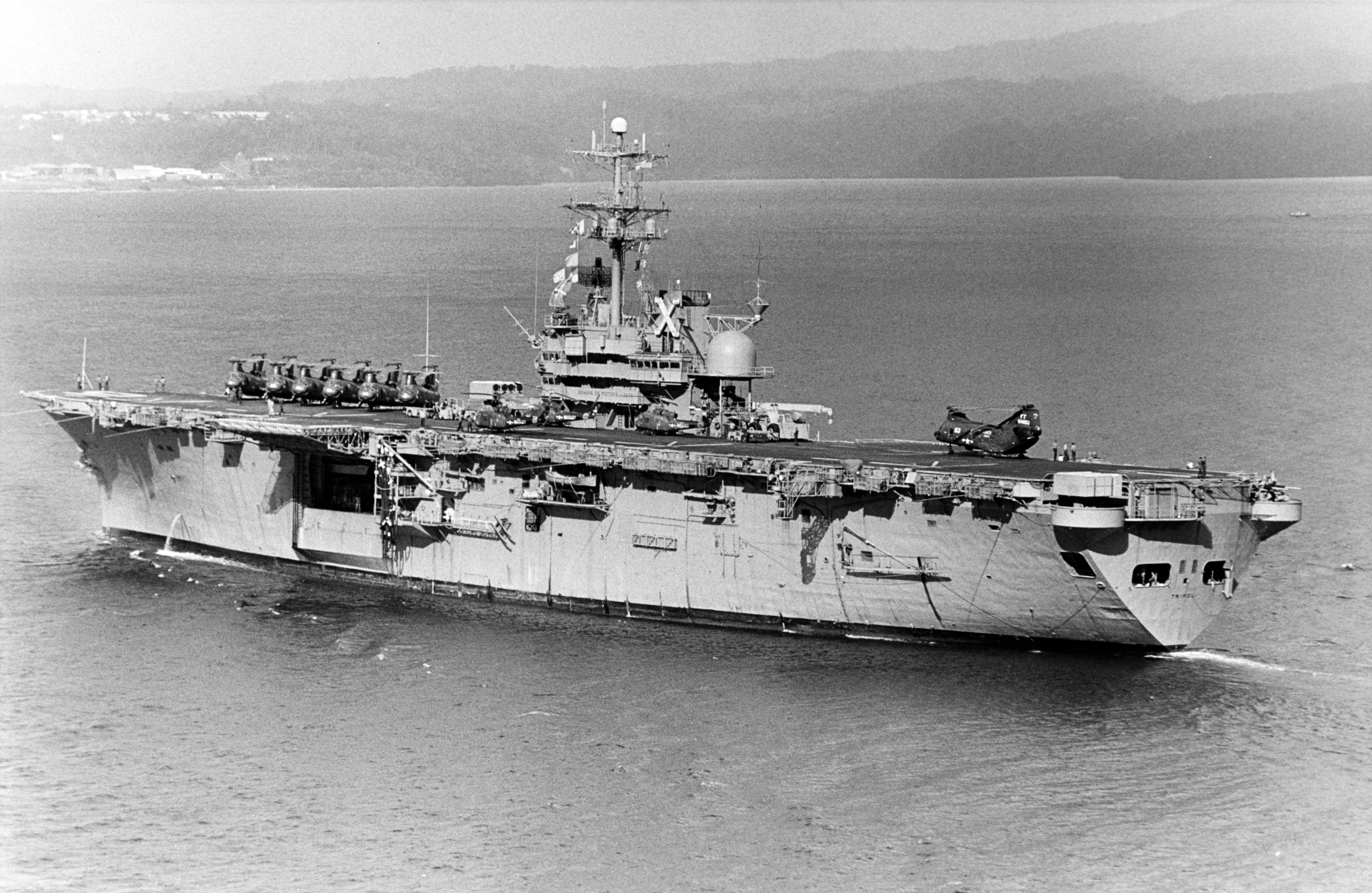
Tripoli entering Subic Bay in 1973

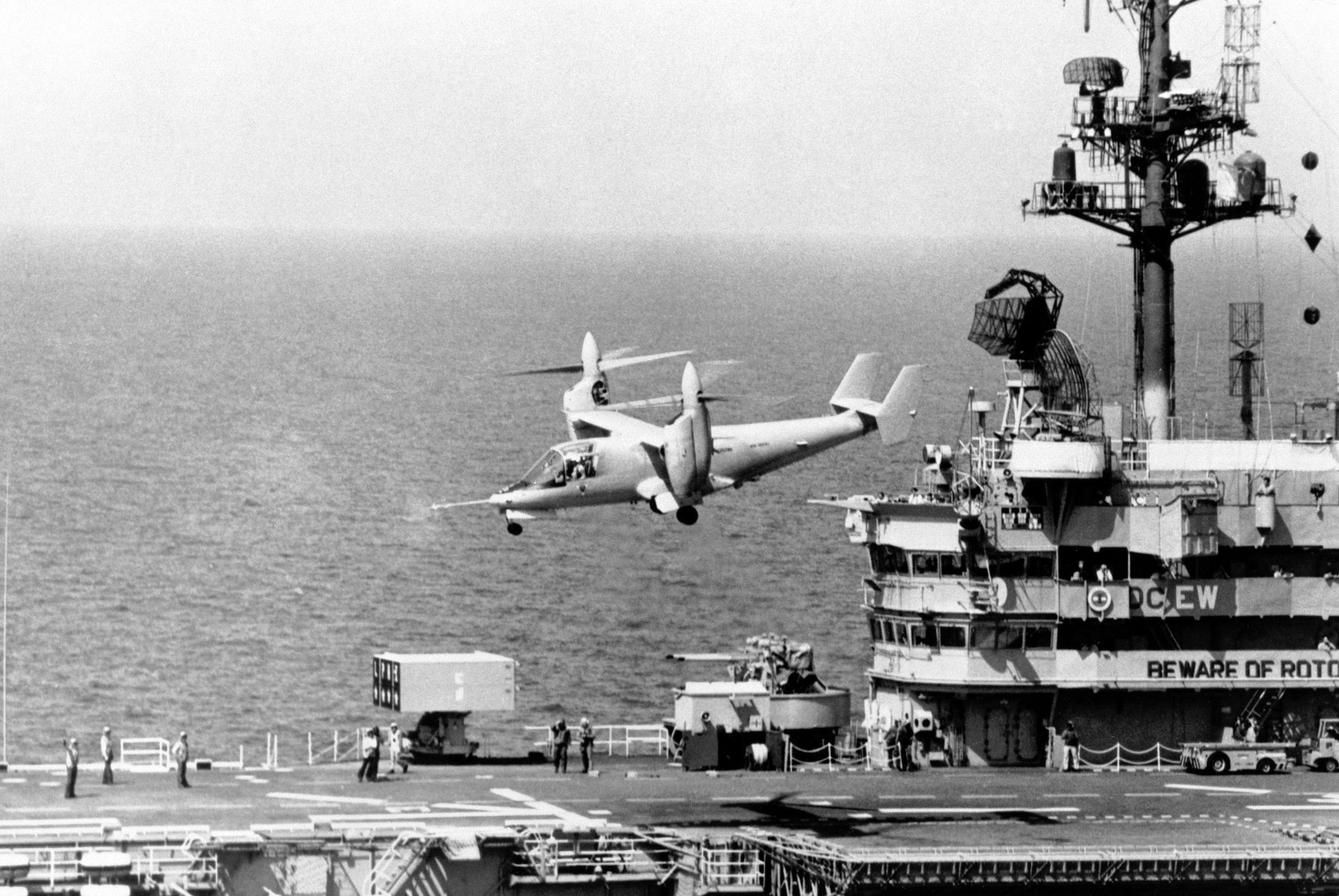
The experimental Bell XV-15 executes a vertical take off from Tripoli in 1983.

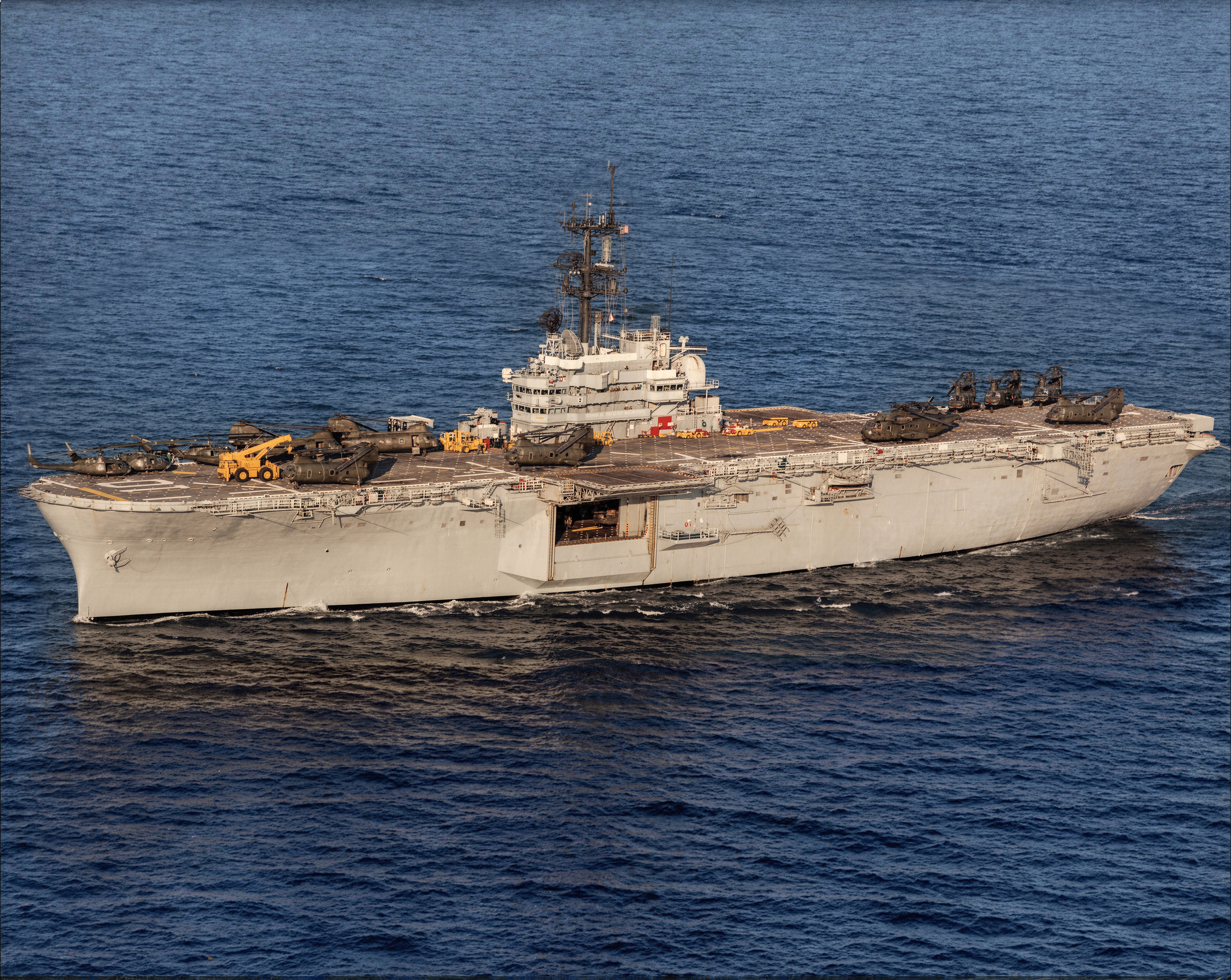
Tripoli underway with the 15th MAU during WESTPAC deployment, late 1987

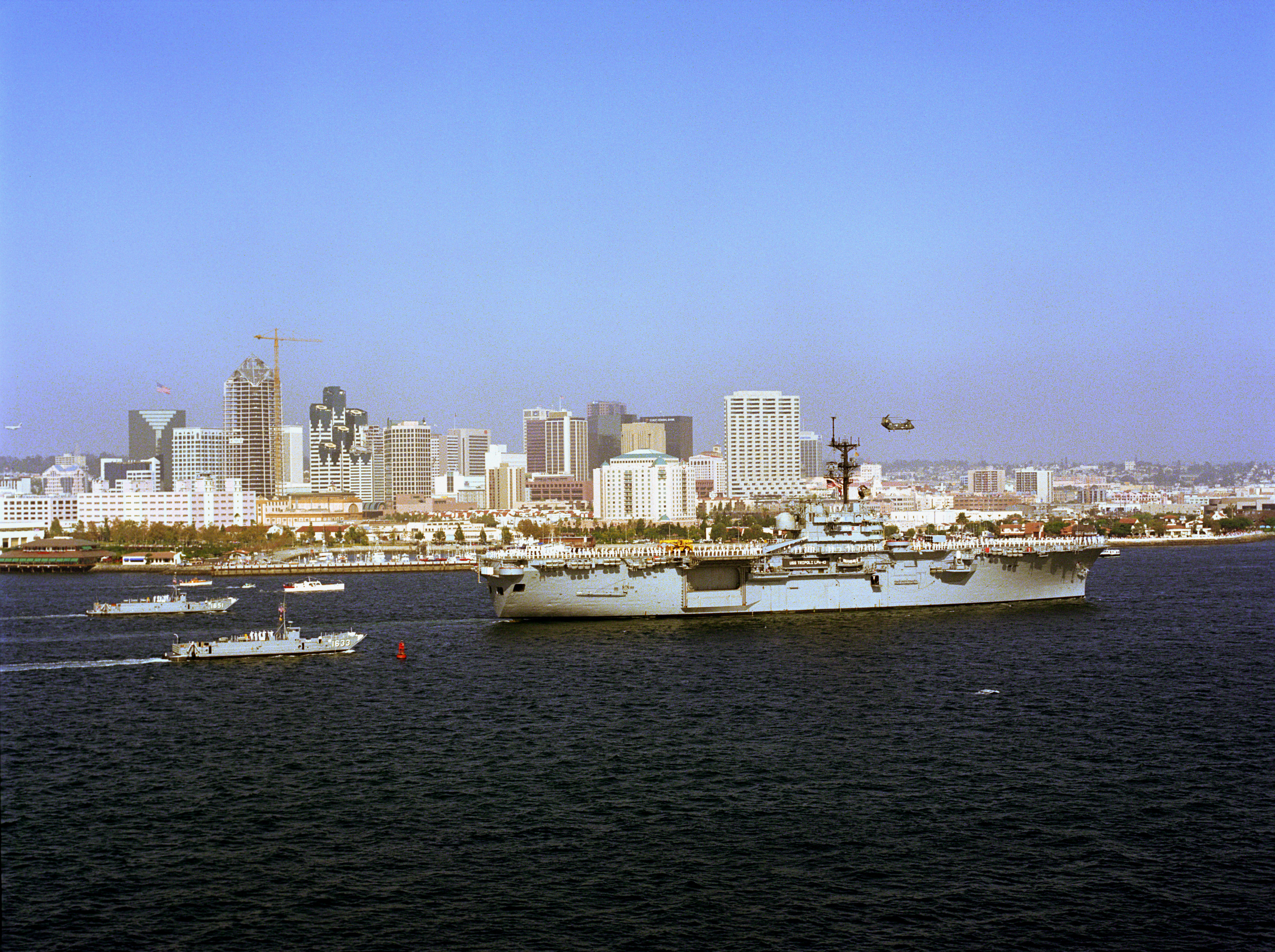
Tripoli leads a ship parade followed by landing craft in San Diego Bay

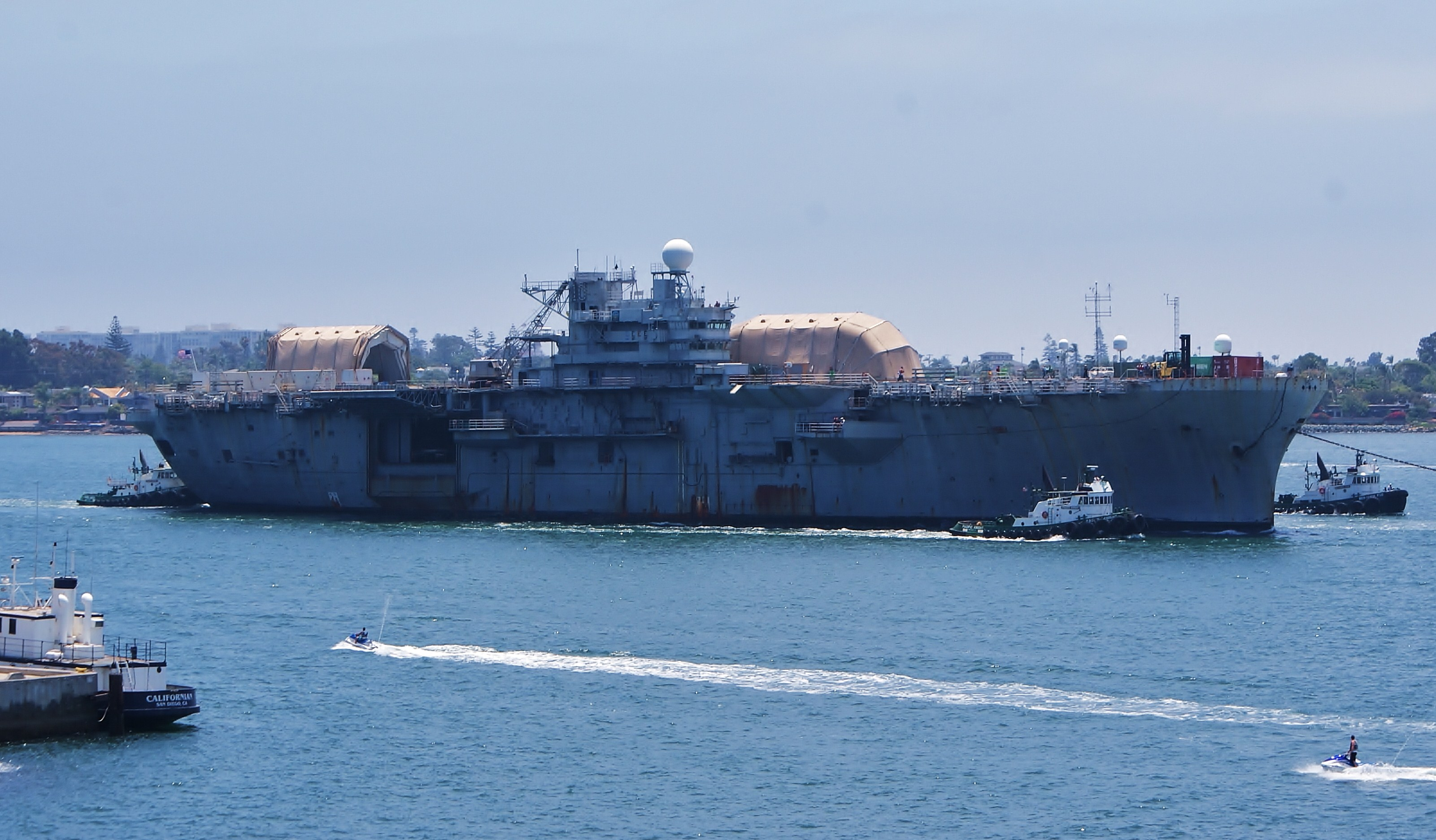
The decommissioned Tripoli being towed out of San Diego Bay

== See also ==
- Vincent O'Rourke, commanding officer of Tripoli 26 August 1970 to 10 September 1971.
- USS Iwo Jima Class Association, USS Iwo Jima Class Association
