= Ministry of Youth Affairs (Bahrain) =

Government ministry of Bahrain

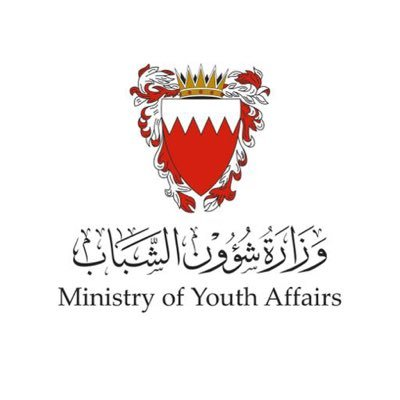

Agency overview
- Formed: 2015
- Jurisdiction: Kingdom of Bahrain
- Minister responsible: Rawan bint Najeeb Tawfeeqi
- Website: www.mya.gov.bh/en

The Ministry of Youth Affairs is the authority responsible for managing youth programs in Bahrain. This ministry was established in 2015 and is headed by Rawan bint Najeeb Tawfeeqi.

== History ==
His Highness Shaikh Isa bin Salman Al Khalifa, the Emir of the state of Bahrain at the time, issued Amiri Decree No. 2 of 1975 establishing a Supreme Council for Youth and Sports, headed by His Highness Shaikh Hamad bin Isa Al Khalifa, the Crown Prince and Commander-in-Chief of the Bahrain Defence Force. The Council is responsible for drawing up the general policy for youth and sports programmes to achieve integration in the areas of youth and sports to create a socially, physically and mentally fit citizen.

Then, Decree-Law No. (5) of 1983 was issued amending Amiri Decree No. 2 of 1975 establishing the Supreme Council for Youth and Sports. Pursuant to this Decree, the General Organization for Youth and Sports was established, affiliated with the Supreme Council for Youth and Sports, and is considered its executive body and assumes the duties of its General Secretariat. It is responsible for proposing and implementing plans, projects and programmes for childhood, youth and sports services in accordance with the decisions and recommendations of the Supreme Council for Youth and Sports in cooperation with relevant bodies and authorities in these fields. It also contributes to providing and equipping youth and sports facilities and providing the necessary technicians for them, and prepares and trains youth and sports leaders. Then Decree-Law No. 33 of 2010 was issued amending some provisions of Decree-Law No. 5 of 1983 amending Amiri Decree No. 2 of 1975 establishing the Supreme Council for Youth and Sports. This decree assigned to the Public Authority for Youth and Sports the responsibility of supervising the youth sector and its affairs, youth centers, national clubs, facilities and projects related to it.

In 2015 King Hamad bin Isa Al Khalifa, King of the Kingdom of Bahrain, issued Decree No. 27 of 2015 appointing a Minister for Youth and Sports Affairs to supervise the General Organization for Youth and Sports. Decree-Law No. 35 of 2015 was then issued abolishing the General Organization for Youth and Sports, with the Ministry of Youth and Sports Affairs or the competent authority named by a decree to exercise all the powers assigned to the General Organization for Youth and Sports stipulated in Decree-Law No. 5 of 1983 amending Amiri Decree No. 2 of 1975 establishing a Supreme Council for Youth and Sports, and the laws, regulations, decisions and systems in force in the Kingdom, with the transfer of all employees of the organization with the same rights and job benefits to the ministry.
