= William P. Driscoll =

United States Navy commander and flying ace

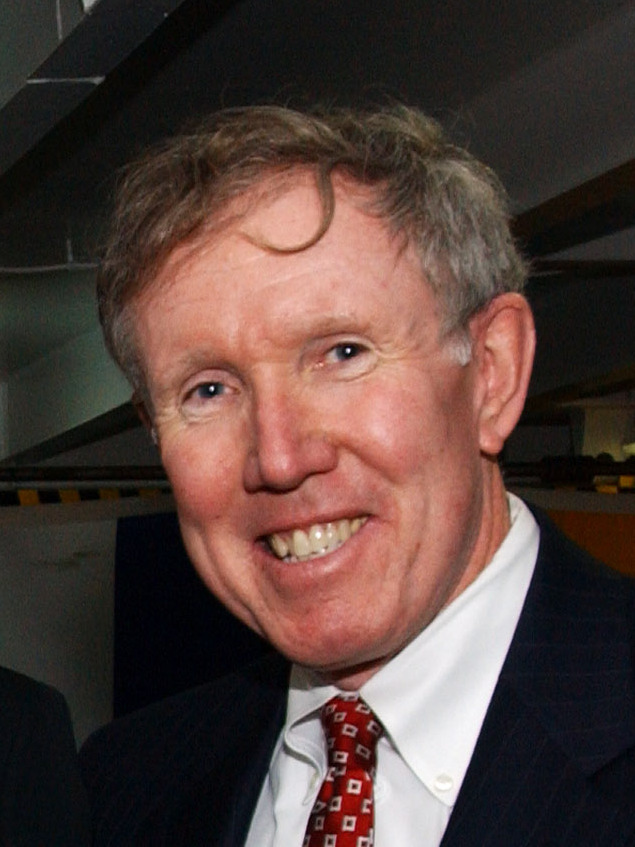
- Driscoll in 2005
- Born: William Patrick Driscoll; March 5, 1947 (age 79); Boston, Massachusetts, United States
- Military career
- Allegiance: United States of America
- Branch: United States Navy
- Service years: 1968–1982
- Rank: Commander
- Nicknames: "Willy Irish", "Drifty"
- Units: VF-96; VF-124
- Conflicts: Vietnam War
- Awards: Navy Cross; Silver Star (2); Purple Heart; Air Medal (10)

William Patrick "Willy Irish" Driscoll (born March 5, 1947) is a retired commander in the United States Navy and a highly decorated flying ace.

Driscoll, a Naval Flight Officer, and air crewmate Duke Cunningham, a Naval Aviator, were their service's only aces of the Vietnam War. They remain the Navy's most recently minted aces. Driscoll received the service's second-highest decoration, the Navy Cross, for his role in a 1972 dogfight with North Vietnamese MiGs.

== Early life and education ==
Driscoll was born March 5, 1947, and received a Bachelor of Arts degree in Economics from Stonehill College in North Easton, Massachusetts, in 1968, and a Master of Science degree in Systems Management from University of Southern California in 1978.

== Naval career ==
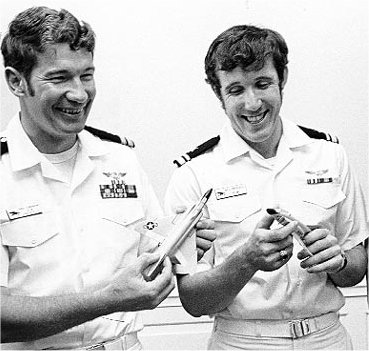
Driscoll (right) and Duke Cunningham in a ceremony honoring them in June 1972

In 1968, Driscoll graduated from Aviation Officer Candidate School and received his commission as an Ensign (ENS) in the Naval Reserve. After initial flight training at Naval Air Station Pensacola, Florida, he completed advanced flight training at Naval Air Station Glynco, Georgia, and received his Naval Flight Officer wings in 1970. He was assigned to the F-4 Phantom II as a Radar Intercept Officer (RIO), part of the two-man aircrews that had been developed to employ the air-to-air missiles that had become the primary weapons of aerial combat. He was assigned to Fighter Squadron 121 (VF-121) at NAS Miramar, California, for fleet replacement squadron training in the F-4J, then to Fighter Squadron 96 (VF-96) The Fighting Falcons, also based at NAS Miramar. As a lieutenant junior grade (LTJG), he served as a RIO with his primary pilot, Lieutenant Duke Cunningham. They became the Navy's only two flying aces during the Vietnam War while VF-96 was embarked on a Western Pacific deployment aboard the aircraft carrier USS Constellation.

Cunningham and Driscoll made their first two kills on separate missions. Their third, fourth, and fifth kills occurred during a single day: May 10, 1972. The engagement became one of the most celebrated aerial dogfights in the war. After they bombed their intended ground target, they engaged 16 MiG interceptors that converged on a bomber convoy of USAF Boeing B-52 Stratofortresses attacking a railyard in Hải Dương. Cunningham shot down two MiG-17s, and became separated from the other aircraft in their strike package. The pair headed for the coast, where they spotted and shot down a lone North Vietnamese MiG-17. Their fighter was then hit by a missile, and they ejected over the Gulf of Tonkin and were rescued. Driscoll was awarded the Navy Cross for his actions.

During the war, Driscoll was promoted to lieutenant. Besides the Navy Cross, he was awarded two Silver Stars, a Purple Heart, and ten Air Medals. He was also nominated for the Medal of Honor. He flew 170 combat missions in total and accumulated over 3,300 flying hours in jet aircraft and 500 carrier landings.

Driscoll later became an instructor at the U.S. Naval Fighter Weapons School (TOPGUN). He then shifted to the F-14 Tomcat and became an instructor at Fighter Squadron 124 (VF-124), the F-14 Fleet Replacement Squadron for the Pacific Fleet at NAS Miramar (now MCAS Miramar), in San Diego, California. He left active duty in 1982, but remained in the United States Navy Reserve, flying the F-4 Phantom II and later the F-14 Tomcat in a Naval Air Reserve fighter squadron at NAS Miramar, eventually retiring with the rank of commander (O-5).

He has remained an air combat consultant at TOPGUN, and has spoken to all 107 graduating TOPGUN classes.

== Post-military career ==
Driscoll works in real estate in San Diego, though he continues to serve as a consultant and public speaker focusing on military aviation issues.
