= LUGM-145 =

The LUGM-145 was an Iraqi produced naval moored contact mine. The mine had a 145 kilogram explosive warhead. In February 1991, during the Gulf War, USS Tripoli (LPH-10) struck a LUGM-145 mine, losing a third of its fuel, and sustaining damage that would cost 3.5 million US dollars to repair.
