= VF-96 =

Fighter Squadron 96
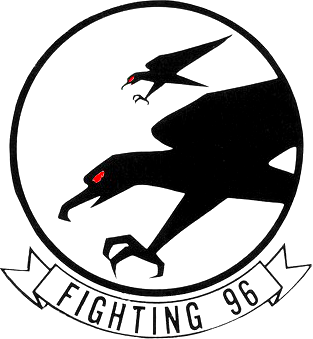
- VF-96 squadron insignia
- Active: 1 June 1962 – 1 December 1975
- Country: United States
- Branch: United States Navy
- Role: Fighter aircraft
- Part of: Inactive
- Nickname: Fighting Falcons
- Engagements: Korean War; Vietnam War

Aircraft flown
- Fighter: F4U-4 Corsair; F9F-6 Cougar; F-8C Crusader; F-4B/J Phantom II

Fighter Squadron 96, or VF-96 Fighting Falcons, was an aviation unit of the United States Navy in service from 1962 to 1975. When assigned to Carrier Air Wing Nine (CVW-9) their tailcode was NG, and their radio callsign was Showtime. Originally established as United States Naval Reserve squadron VF-791 Fighting Falcons on 20 July 1950 it was redesignated VF-142 after becoming a regular squadron on 4 February 1953. It was re-designated VF-96 on 1 June 1962 and disestablished on 1 December 1975.

== History ==
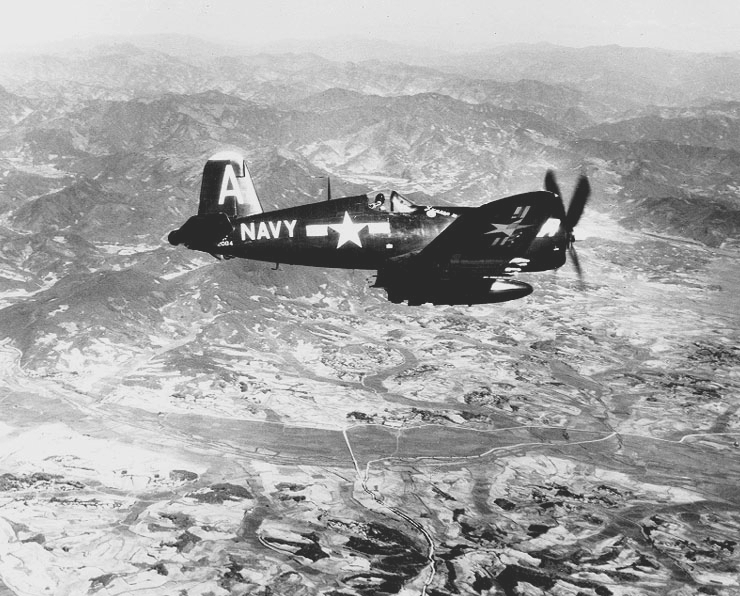
VF-791 F4U-4 over Korea in September 1951

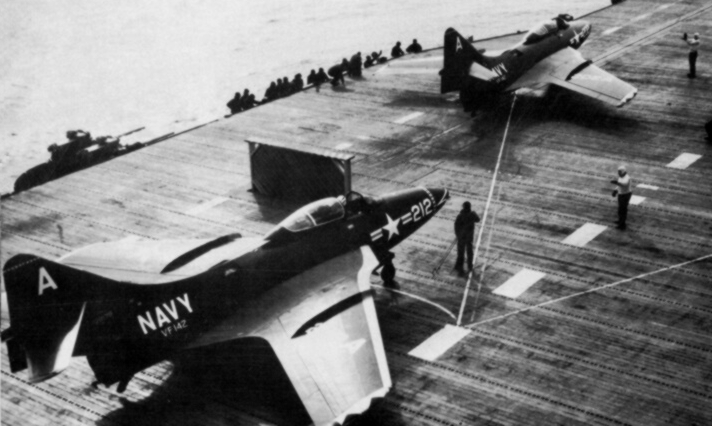
VF-142 F9F-6s on USS Randolph in 1954

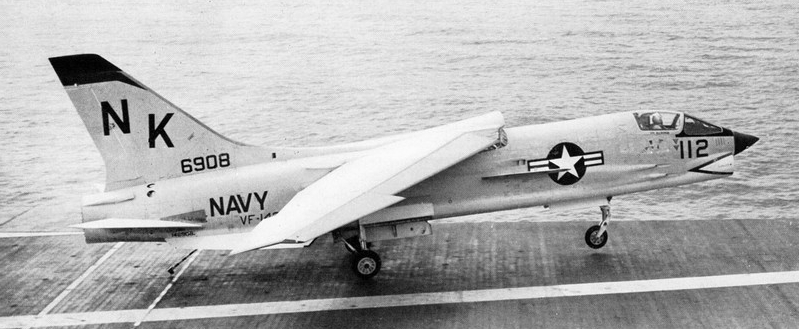
VF-142 F-8C on USS Oriskany in 1960

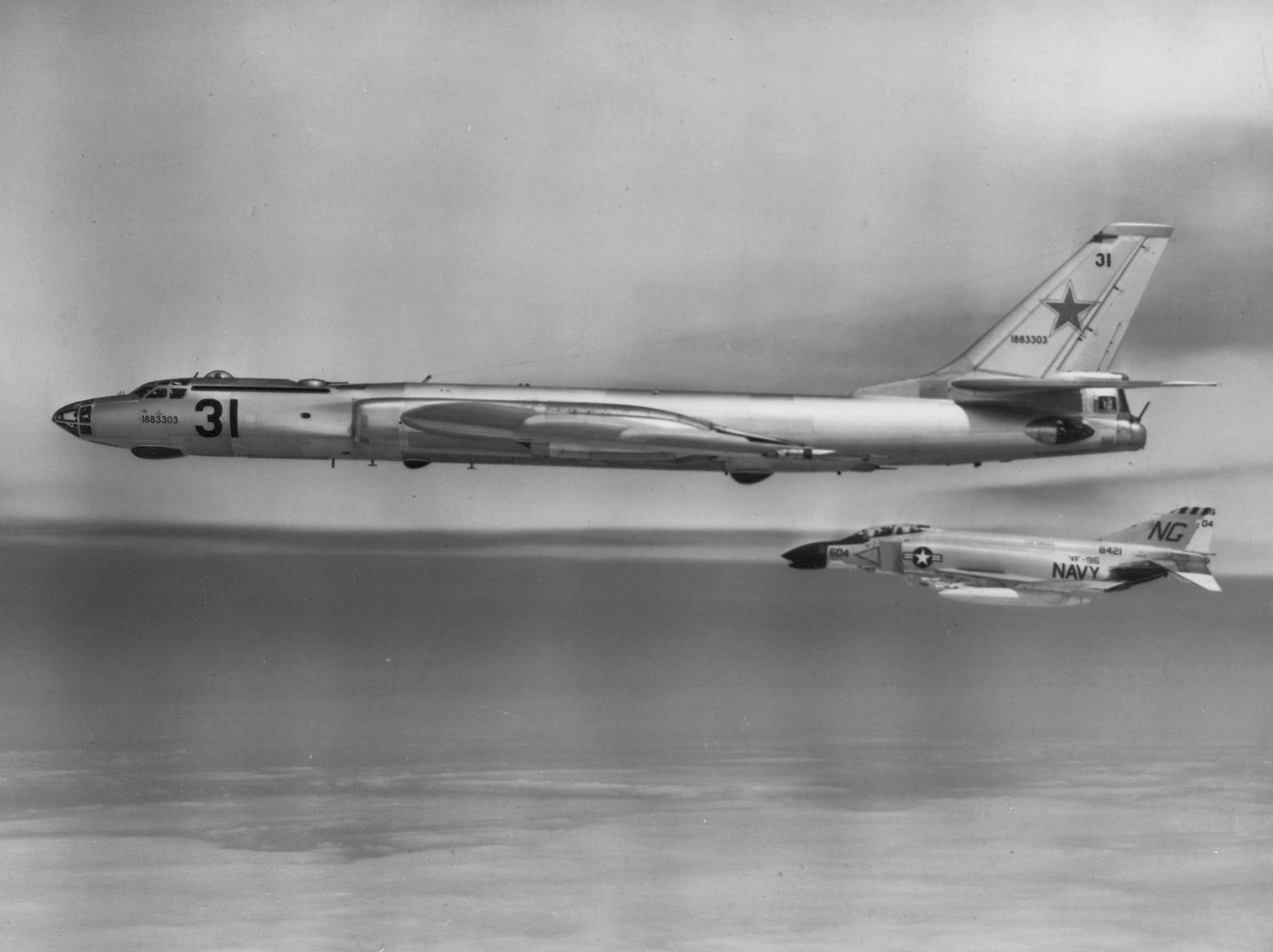
VF-96 F-4B escorts a Soviet Tu-16 in 1963.

VF-791 was assigned to Carrier Air Group 101 (CVG-101) aboard USS Boxer for a deployment to the Western Pacific and Korea from 2 March to 24 October 1951. During this deployment VF-783 lost 4 F4U-4s.

VF-142 was assigned to Carrier Air Group 14 (CVG-14) aboard USS Randolph for a Mediterranean deployment from 3 February to 6 August 1954.

VF-142 was assigned to CVG-14 aboard USS Ranger for a deployment to the Western Pacific from 3 January to 27 July 1959.

VF-142 was assigned to CVG-14 aboard USS Oriskany for a deployment to the Western Pacific from 14 May to 15 December 1960.

VF-142 was assigned to Carrier Air Group 11 (CVG-11) aboard USS Kitty Hawk for her voyage around South America from 11 August to 1 November 1961.

VF-96 was assigned to Carrier Air Wing Nine aboard the aircraft carrier USS Ranger for a deployment to the Western Pacific from 9 November 1962 to 14 June 1963.

=== Vietnam ===
VF-96 embarked aboard USS Ranger for a deployment to Vietnam from 5 August 1964 to 6 May 1965.

On 9 April 1965 an F-4B #151425 from VF-96 crashed into the sea following an engine flameout on launch for a four-plane combat air patrol (CAP). Later during the patrol an F-4B #151403 piloted by Lieutenant j.g. Terence M. Murphy and his RIO, Ensign Ronald Fegan, shot down a Chinese MiG-17 "Fresco" near Hainan, scoring the F-4 Phantom's first air-to-air victory. The Phantom was then shot down either by another MiG or, as enemy reports later indicated, an AIM-7 Sparrow from one of Murphy's and Fegan's wingmen. Murphy and Fegan were listed as killed in action, body not recovered.

VF-96 embarked aboard the aircraft carrier USS Enterprise for a deployment to Vietnam from 26 October 1965 to 21 June 1966.

On 12 February 1967, Lieutenant Commander Martin Sullivan and Lieutenant j.g. Paul Carlson flying F-4B #152219 crashed at sea during intercept training.

On 9 May 1968 USAF exchange pilot Captain John Heffernan and his RIO Lieutenant j.g. Frank Schumacher shot down a Vietnam People's Air Force (VPAF) MiG-21 with an AIM-7.

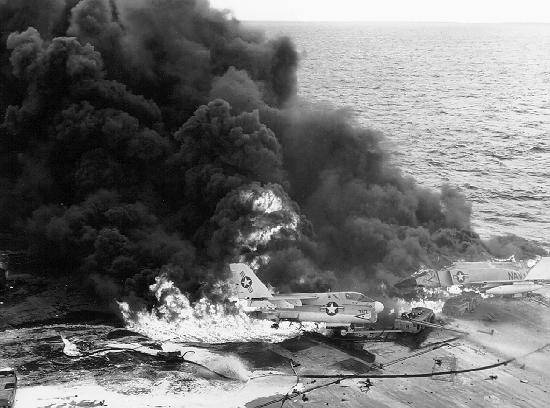
A-7B from VA-146 and F-4J from VF-96 burning on USS Enterprise

Six squadron F-4Js were destroyed and ten crewmen killed during the USS Enterprise fire on 14 January 1969.

VF-96 embarked aboard USS America for a deployment to Vietnam from 10 April to 21 December 1970.

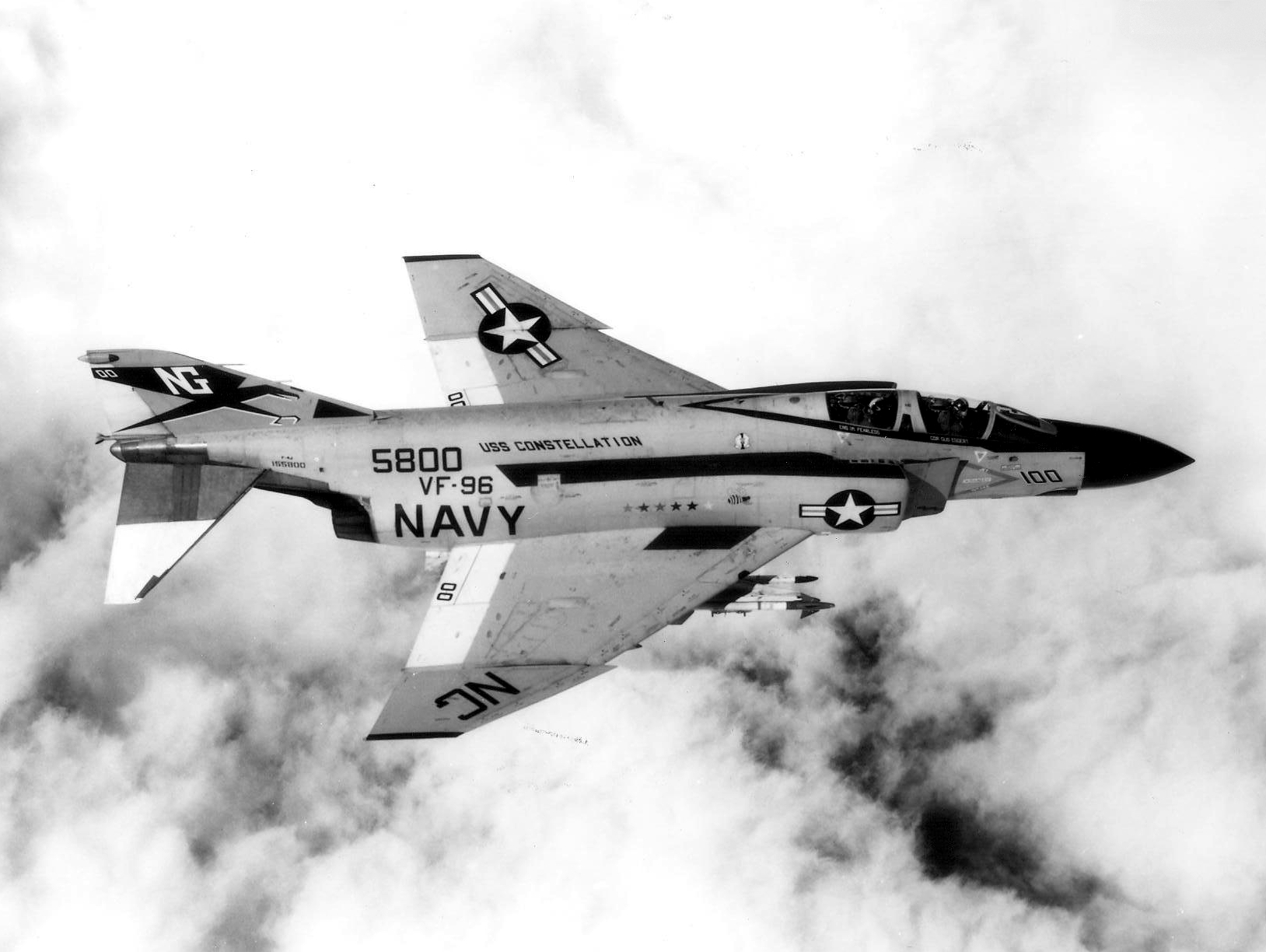
"Showtime 100", the VF-96 F-4J flown for three "kills" by Cunningham and Driscoll

VF-96 embarked aboard USS Constellation for a deployment to Vietnam from 1 October 1971 to 1 July 1972. During this deployment, Lieutenant Duke Cunningham and Lieutenant j.g. William P. Driscoll of VF-96 scored their five aerial victories. On 19 January Cunningham and Driscoll shot down a MiG-21, on 8 May a MiG-17, and on 10 May they shot down three MiG-17s, becoming the only US Navy aces of the war. Three more VPAF MiG-17s were downed by two other VF-96 crews on 10 May, two by Lieutenant Michael J. Connelly and Lieutenant Thomas J. Blonski and one by Lieutenant Steven C. "Lurch" Shoemaker and Lieutenant j.g. Keith V. Crenshaw (Shoemaker had been solo Blue Angel #6 in 1969 and #5 in 1970 seasons). All eight victories were scored with AIM-9 Sidewinders.

VF-96 again embarked on Constellation for its final Vietnam cruise from 5 January to 11 October 1973.

Between 21 June and 23 December 1974 the Fighting Falcons along with sister-squadron VF-92 made its last operational deployment with CVW-9, aboard Constellation, before being disestablished on 1 December 1975.

== Home port assignments ==
- NAS Jacksonville
- NAS Miramar

== Aircraft assignment ==
- F4U-5 Corsair
- F9F-6 Cougar
- F-8C Crusader
- F-4B/J Phantom II

== Notable members ==
- Pete Conrad
- Duke Cunningham
- William P. Driscoll
- Richard F. Gordon, Jr.
- Vincent O'Rourke
- Lawrence E. "Larry" Wear Jr.

== See also ==
- History of the United States Navy
- List of inactive United States Navy aircraft squadrons
- List of United States Navy aircraft squadrons
