= Aymen Tawfeeq Almoayed =

Bahraini diplomat, lawyer and strategist

His Excellency Aymen bin Tawfeeq Almoayed
- Arabic: أيمن بن توفيق عبد الرحمن المؤيد

Secretary General of the Supreme Council for Youth and Sports
- Incumbent
- Assumed office 21 November 2022
- Prime Minister: Salman bin Hamad Al Khalifa

Personal details
- Born: 10 October 1982 (age 44) Riffa, Bahrain
- Education: University of Kent (LLB), Cambridge Judge Business School (MBA)
- Occupation: Politician, businessman

Aymen Tawfeeq Abdulrahman Almoayed (Arabic: أيمن بن توفيق عبد الرحمن المؤيد; born 10 October 1982) is a Bahraini diplomat, lawyer and strategist, and was the youngest member in the Cabinet of Bahrain until the cabinet reshuffle on June 14, 2022. Almoayed was appointed as the Secretary General of the Supreme Council for Youth and Sports in the Kingdom of Bahrain on November 21, 2022.

== Early life and education ==
Almoayed was born on October 10, 1982, in Riffa, Bahrain. Almoayed graduated in 2003 with an LLB (Bachelor of Laws) from the University of Kent, United Kingdom. Thereafter in 2010 he graduated with a Master in Business Administration from the University of Cambridge - Judge Business School, United Kingdom.

== Career ==
In 2004, Almoayed founded Chambers & Guilds, which focuses on Litigation, Corporate Consultancy, and Strategic Advisory Services. In 2006, he established Insaf (formerly called Almoayed Legal Services), a Bahrain-based law firm that focuses on litigation for financial institutions such as CIM, Citibank, Unicorn Investment Bank, and the Liquidity Management Center.

On November 21, 2022, he was appointed as Secretary General of the Supreme Council for Youth and Sports in the Kingdom of Bahrain after spending close to four years as Minister of Youth and Sports Affairs by a decree of King Hamad bin Isa Al Khalifa. On March 2, 2023, His Highness Shaikh Nasser bin Hamad Al Khalifa issued an edict appointing Aymen Almoayed as Board Chairman of the Arab Shipbuilding and Repair Yard Company (ASRY).

Almoayed also serves as a Chairman of the Supervisory Board for Kempinski, from February 16, 2023. Prior to his appointment as the Minister of Youth and Sports Affairs, Almoayed held several positions including, the Chairman of the Quality Assurance Authority for Education and Training (QAAET), board member of the government's Supreme Council for Youth and Sports, Chairman of the Board of Directors of the Hope Fund, Member of board of trustees of the University of Bahrain, member of the board of directors of the Bahrain Stock Exchange from 2016 to 2019 and member of the Coordination, Execution and Follow-up Committee (Estijaba).

Awarded "The Prince Salman bin Hamad Medal for Medical Merit" in December 2021 and "The order of Bahrain First Class" Medal in December 2022

== Publications ==
- 2021: Commercial laws of the Kingdom of Bahrain
