= Vincent O'Rourke =

Former US Navy Captain and naval aviator

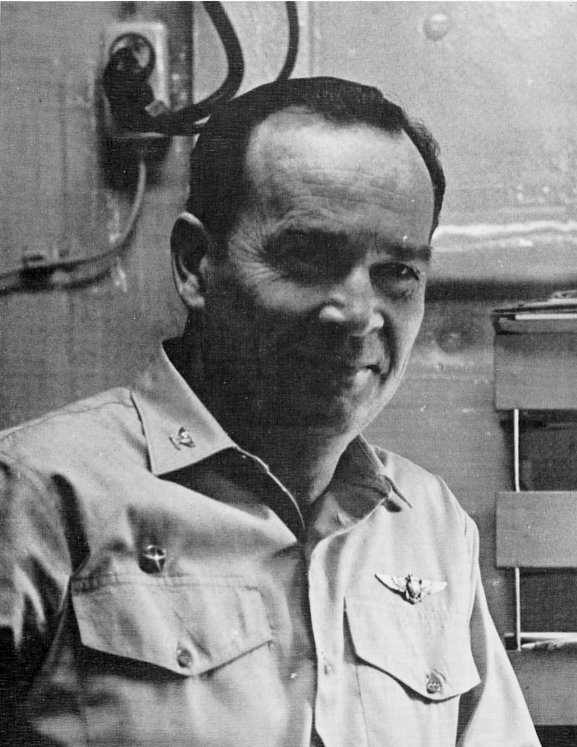
- O'Rourke while he was commanding officer of USS Tripoli
- Born: Vincent Patrick O'Rourke; May 19, 1922; New York City, US
- Died: July 14, 2011 (aged 89); Coronado, California, US
- Burial place: Arlington National Cemetery
- Spouse: Harriett Julia Sokal (1922–2007)
- Military career
- Allegiance: United States of America
- Branch: United States Navy
- Service years: 1942 – 1974
- Rank: Captain
- Service number: 0-320529
- Unit: VT-47 on USS Bataan (CVL-29)
- Commands: USS Tripoli (LPH-10); USS Rainier (AE-5)
- Conflicts: World War II; Vietnam War
- Awards: Navy Cross (2) Legion of Merit DFC Bronze Star Medal Air Medal (5)

Vincent Patrick O'Rourke (19 May 1922 – 14 July 2011) was a World War II United States naval aviator in the Pacific theater and two time recipient of the Navy Cross, the Navy's second highest award for valor after the Medal of Honor. After the war, he was commanding officer of a number of aviation units as well as USS Rainier (AE-5) and USS Tripoli (LPH-10).

== Background and education ==
Vincent Patrick O'Rourke was born on 19 May 1922 in New York City to Francis and Alice O'Rourke. He grew up in Forest Hills, Queens. In 1940, he began studying Aeronautical Engineering at the Brooklyn Polytechnic Institute. In 1954, he received a Bachelor of Science degree in Aeronautical Engineering from the Naval Postgraduate School. He also received a Master of Science degree from Purdue University. He also graduated from the Naval Test Pilot School and the Armed Forces Staff College. He was married to Harriett Julia Sokal (1922–2007) of Middle Village, Queens for 63 years.

== Navy career ==
O'Rourke enlisted in the Navy 27 July 1942 as an aviation cadet. He became an Ensign in October 1943. He served with VF-74 aboard USS Kasaan Bay (CVE-69) the Mediterranean theater. On 9 July 1944, while he was landing on Kasaan Bay, his TBM-1C hit the catwalk and severely damaged a wing, but there were no injuries.

He served as a pilot with torpedo squadron 47 (VT-47) on USS Bataan (CVL-29) flying a TBM-3 Avenger and was awarded a number of medals for valor including two Navy Cross medals and a Bronze star. LTJG O'Rourke received his first Navy Cross was for his attack on the Japanese fleet at Kobe Bay on 19 March 1945. He bombed a large aircraft carrier under heavy anti-aircraft fire and smoke-screening. His second Navy Cross related to his role in the attack on the Japanese cruiser Tone during the 28 July 1945 attack on Kure Harbor. O'Rourke flew just over 216 hours on 33 strike missions during VT-47's 18 March 1945 to 15 August 1945 combat deployment aboard Bataan.

He served as executive officer of fighter squadron VF-124 and Commanding officer of fighter squadrons VF-96 and VF-142 prior to 1964.

In 1964, Commander O'Rourke was executive officer of USS Oriskany (CVA-34) after serving there as Air Officer. He became a captain in December 1964. O'Rourke was commanding officer of USS Rainier (AE-5) from 5 August 1966 to 2 August 1967. O'Rourke was commanding officer of USS Tripoli (LPH-10) from 26 August 1970 to 10 September 1971.

O'Rourke retired to Coronado, California, in July 1974 and was a consultant in the US, Europe and Middle East. He died 14 July 2011 in Coronado. He was buried at Arlington National Cemetery, section 55, grave 3495 on 11 October 2012.

== Awards ==
During his career in the Navy, O'Rourke received the Navy Cross with Gold Star for second award, Legion of Merit, Distinguished Flying Cross, Bronze Star with valor device, Air Medal with 4 Gold Stars for subsequent awards and the Meritorious Service Medal.

=== Award citations ===
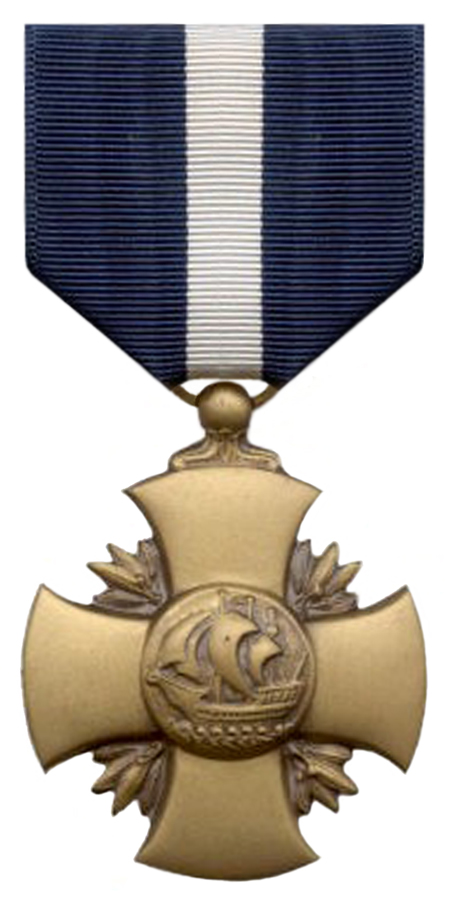
Navy Cross

The Commander of 1st Carrier Task Force awarded O'Rourke the Navy Cross for actions 19 March 1945 during a raid on Kobe Bay:

The President of the United States of America takes pleasure in presenting the Navy Cross to Lieutenant, Junior Grade Vincent Patrick O'Rourke (NSN: 0-320529), United States Naval Reserve, for extraordinary heroism in operations against the enemy while serving as Pilot of a carrier-based Navy Torpedo Plane in Torpedo Squadron FORTY-SEVEN (VT-47), attached to the U.S.S. Bataan (CVL-29), in action on 19 March 1945, in action against units of the Japanese Fleet in Kobe Bay, Honshu, Japan, on 19 March 1945. Skillfully maneuvering to locate his target under a heavy enemy smoke screen, Lieutenant, Junior Grade, O'Rourke launched an attack on a large Japanese carrier and, in the face of intense hostile anti-aircraft fire, scored several direct hits on the vessel. By his courage under fire, skilled airmanship and determination in the completion of his mission, Lieutenant, Junior Grade, O'Rourke contributed materially to the success of the attack in removing a menace to our own Fleet operations. His devotion to duty throughout was in keeping with the highest traditions of the United States Naval Service.

— Commander 1st Carrier Task Force: Serial 0948 (July 6, 1945)

The Commander of 2nd Carrier Task Force, Pacific awarded O'Rourke the Navy Cross for actions on 28 July 1945 during a raid on Kure Harbor and his role in sinking Japanese cruiser Tone.

The President of the United States of America takes pleasure in presenting a Gold Star in lieu of a Second Award of the Navy Cross to Lieutenant, Junior Grade Vincent Patrick O'Rourke (NSN: 0-320529), United States Naval Reserve, for extraordinary heroism in operations against the enemy while serving as Pilot of a carrier-based Navy Torpedo Plane in Torpedo Squadron FORTY-SEVEN (VT-47), attached to the U.S.S. Bataan (CVL-29), in action against powerful units of the Japanese Fleet at Kure Harbor, Honshu Island, Japan, on 28 July 1945. Braving intense and accurate anti-aircraft gunfire from shore batteries and several Naval units in the vicinity, Lieutenant, Junior Grade, O'Rourke vigorously pressed home an attack against the enemy heavy cruiser Tone and, despite a heavy barrage of protective gunfire from the vessel, succeeded in scoring two hits on the port quarter and amidships abaft the stacks. His courage and devotion to duty contributed materially to her sinking immediately after the attack and were in keeping with the highest traditions of the United States Naval Service.

— Commander 2d Carrier Task Force Pacific: Serial 01880 (September 20, 1945)

== Dates of rank ==
- 1 October 1943 Ensign.
- 1 January 1949 Lieutenant.
- 1 July 1959 Commander.
- 1 December 1964 Captain.
- July 1974 Captain, Retired.

== Bibliography ==
- O'Rourke, Vincent P. (1955). Personnel practices and the concepts of professional employees (Report). (Masters Thesis)
