= Arab Shipbuilding and Repair Yard Company =

Company based in Bahrain

Arab Shipbuilding and Repair Yard
- Native name: الشركة العربية لبناء وإصلاح السفن
- Company type: Private
- Industry: Shipbuilding Ship Repair
- Founded: 1977; 49 years ago
- Headquarters: Al Hidd, Muharraq Governorate, Bahrain
- Area served: Persian Gulf
- Key people: Ahmed Al-Abri (Chief Executive Officer)
- Owners: Bahrain, Kuwait, UAE, Iraq, KSA and Libya
- Website: www.asry.net

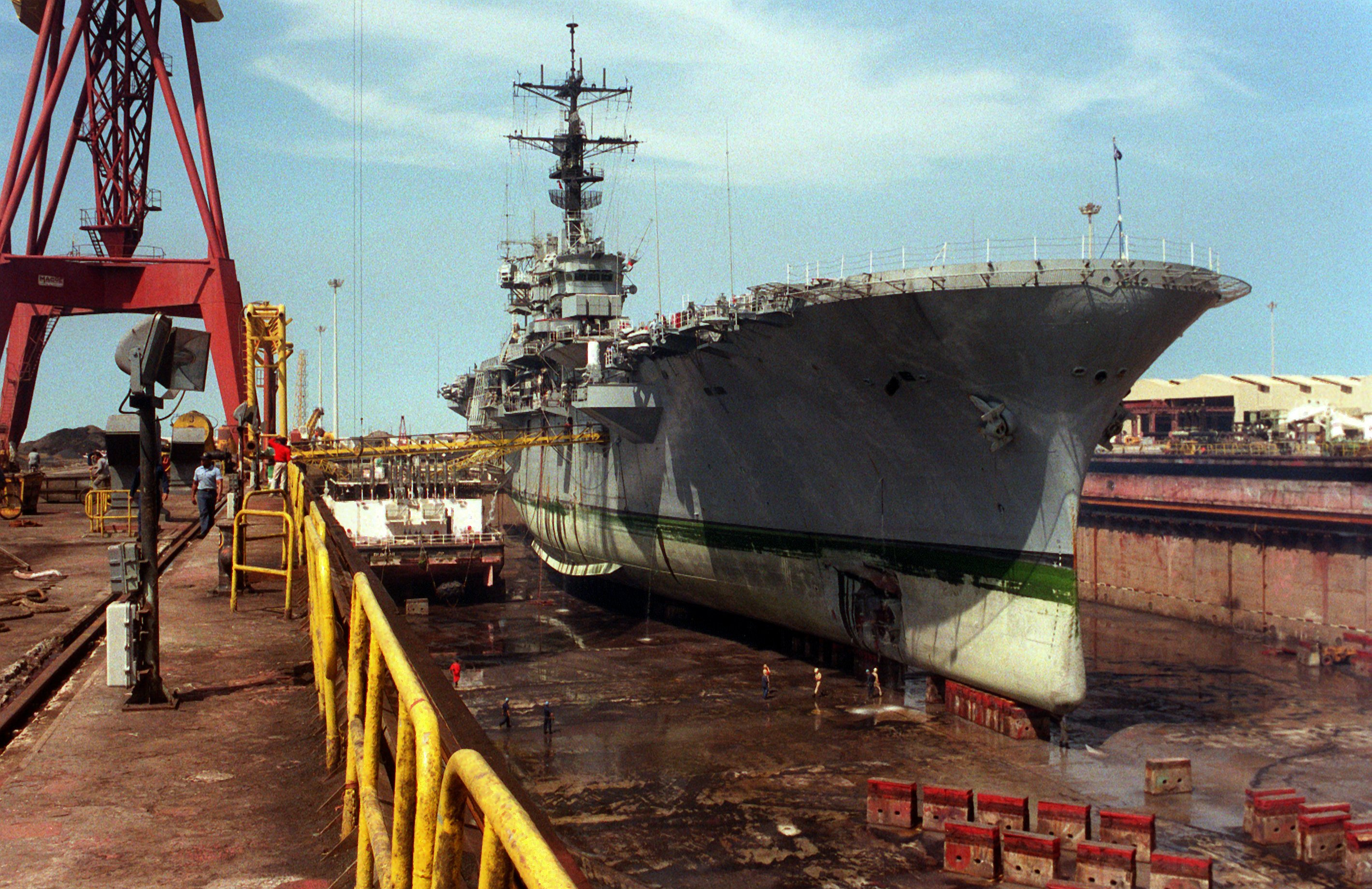
1991, USS Tripoli (LPH-10) in dry dock for repairs of Arab Shipbuilding and Repair Yard Company (Dubaî) to a hole in its starboard bow caused by an Iraqi mine.

Arab Shipbuilding and Repair Yard Company (ASRY), (Arabic: الشركة العربية لبناء وإصلاح السفن) is a Multinational Arab company based in Al Hidd, Bahrain. The company was founded in 1977, by seven OAPEC member countries: Bahrain, Kuwait, United Arab Emirates.

The company offers shipbuilding and vessel repair services and manufactures towing tugs, work and crew boats, and offshore service vessels. The company's repair services include crank shaft replacement, new crank shaft insertion, crane barge to pipe laying vessel conversion, pipe laying barge conversion, propeller repair, steel machining, pipe fabrication, painting and hydro blasting, and electrical, electronic, and instrumentation repairs and installations.
