= USS Rainier (AE-5) =

Ammunition ship of the United States Navy

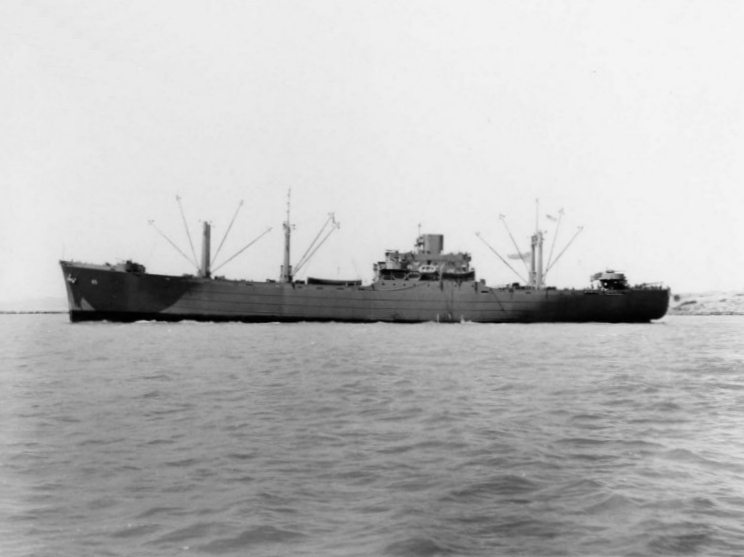
- USS Rainier (AE-5)

History

United States
- Name: USS Rainier (AE-5)
- Namesake: Mount Rainier
- Laid down: 14 May 1940
- Launched: 1 March 1941
- Acquired: 16 April 1941
- Commissioned: 21 December 1941; 25 May 1951
- Decommissioned: 30 April 1946; 7 August 1970
- Stricken: 7 August 1970
- Fate: Scrapped October 1971

General characteristics
- Class & type: Lassen-class ammunition ship
- Displacement: Light: 6,350 tons; Full load:13,855 tons
- Length: 459 ft (140 m)
- Beam: 63 ft (19.2 m)
- Draught: 25 ft 11 in (7.9 m)
- Propulsion: 2 x 9 cyl. Nordberg diesel engines each with 3155 brake horsepower at 225 rpm geared to 1 shaft
- Speed: 16 knots (30 km/h)
- Capacity: 5,000 deadweight tons
- Complement: 280 officers and enlisted
- Armament: 1 × single 5 in (127 mm) 38 caliber gun; 4 × single 3 in (76 mm) 50 caliber guns; 2 × twin 40 mm guns; 8 × twin 20 mm guns

USS Rainier (AE-5), the second US Navy vessel named after Mount Rainier, was laid down on 14 May 1940 by the Tampa Shipbuilding Co., Tampa, Fla., as Rainbow (MC hull 124); launched 1 March 1941; sponsored by Mrs. Robert E. Anderson; transferred to the US Navy on 16 April 1941; converted for use as an ammunition auxiliary; and commissioned as Rainier (AE-5) on 21 December 1941 at Norfolk, Va..

== World War II ==
After a 6-week shakedown in Cuban waters, Rainier transited the Panama Canal and reported to Commander, Surface Force, Pacific Fleet. Between February and May 1942, she made two ammunition runs from Port Chicago, Calif., to Pearl Harbor, whence, on 10 May, she steamed for Tongatapu. There, through the battles of the Coral Sea and Midway, she offloaded her cargo for transfer to shore depots and issued ammunition to Allied ships, particularly task forces 18, 15, and 16.

At the end of July, she shifted to the Fijis to supply ships preparing for Operation Watchtower, the assault on the Solomons. Then, on 5 August, she continued on to Noumea, New Caledonia, where she remained through the initial phases of the Guadalcanal campaign.

On 24 September, Rainier moved southeast to Auckland and on 27 September headed back to the United States. For the remainder of the year and into 1943, she made ammunition and general cargo runs between the west coast and Hawaii. At the end of February, she sailed once more for the South Pacific.

She arrived at Espiritu Santo in the New Hebrides on 17 March and remained until 5 May. She then shifted to Efate where she offloaded her remaining torpedoes and ammunition; took on empty shell cases and damaged ammunition; and on the 14th got underway to return to San Francisco and another 5 months of west coast-Hawaii shuttle operations.

On 25 October, she headed back to Efate. Arriving on 11 November, just prior to the Gilbert Islands campaign, she discharged general and ammunition cargo in Havannah Harbor into December. On the 21st, she shifted to Espiritu Santo; thence proceeded to Funafuti in the Ellice group. There, she issued ammunition to ships of the fast carrier forces, to the defense forces of the occupied areas, and to the forces preparing for the Marshalls offensive.

On 31 January 1944, Majuro was occupied and work was begun to turn the atoll into a major advance base. Rainier arrived in the lagoon three days later. In mid-April, she returned to San Francisco. At the end of May, she was back at Majuro to rearm the fast carrier forces prior to strikes supporting the initial assault on Saipan. On 11 June, as the assault force moved toward Saipan, Rainier shifted to Eniwetok, whence, in mid-July, she steamed to Saipan. On 30 July, she sailed east again; completed an abbreviated overhaul at San Francisco; filled her holds at Port Chicago; and returned to Eniwetok on 31 October.

The Philippine campaign had started and the fast carrier forces were striking at Japanese positions and shipping from Indochina to the Ryukyus. Rainier moved west, to the western Carolines. On 5 November, she arrived at Ulithi, where she remained until after Okinawa operations were well underway. On 25 May 1945, the ammunition ship headed for the Philippines, where she served the Allies from the 28th until after the signing of the surrender documents.

Assigned to support occupation forces, Rainier steamed for Okinawa in mid-September. On 6 December, she sailed for the United States, arriving at Port Angeles, on 23 December. With the new year, 1946, she began preparations for inactivation. In the spring she shifted to San Diego; decommissioned there on 30 August, and was berthed with the Pacific Reserve Fleet through the end of the decade.

== Korean War ==
In June 1950 the North Korean Army crossed the 38th Parallel and invaded the Republic of Korea (South Korea). United States and other United Nations forces deployed to bolster South Korean forces attempting to slow the advance of the Communists. Supplies, however, were inadequate. Munitions depots in the Far East and in Micronesia were limited in quantity and type. USS Mount Katmai (AE-16) was the only ammunition ship active in the Pacific.

Ammunition facilities on the west coast were expanded. As the Military Sea Transportation Service and the Maritime Administration were pressed for cargo space, reserve fleet ships were ordered activated.

Rainier recommissioned 25 May 1951, but remained in the eastern Pacific for 6 months. On 3 November, she sailed west.

Through December of that year and into the summer of 1952, she operated out of Sasebo, carrying her vital cargo to replenishment areas off the coast of the embattled Korean peninsula and to shore facilities at Pohang and Pusan. In September, she returned to California for an overhaul but was back in Korean waters to resupply United Nations naval forces in early February 1953.

The end of July 1953 brought an uneasy truce, and in August Rainier headed back to the United States. In November, however, she returned to the Far East on her first, peacetime, 6-month WestPac deployment. Through 1955, her annual deployments included shuttle runs between Japanese ports and 7th Fleet replenishment areas in waters off Japan and Korea. In 1956, her operating schedule was expanded into the 1960s, including operations in the Philippine area out of Subic Bay.

== Vietnam War ==
In 1964, as the war in South Vietnam expanded, Subic Bay became the focal point of Rainier’s 7th Fleet support activities. There when the Gulf of Tonkin Incident occurred, 4–5 August, she put to sea immediately and steamed to the gulf to rearm carriers conducting strikes on North Vietnamese bases.

For the next months, Rainier operated between Subic Bay and replenishment areas off Vietnam. In late October, she sailed for Japan and in December, she arrived back at her homeport, Concord, California In the late spring of 1965, she resumed 7th Fleet operations and by January 1966, had transferred at sea almost 12,000 tons of ammunition, 83 tons of freight, and 11,500 pounds of mail. In February, she returned to Concord. In April, she moved to San Francisco for overhaul and, in August, began refresher training with new equipment aboard which increased her underway replenishment capabilities.

In February 1967, Rainier resumed her annual deployments to provide underway logistic support to the 7th Fleet. By 16 September, the date of her last at-sea munitions transfer on that tour, she had transferred 13,000 tons during 204 underway replenishments.

Departing Subic Bay on 25 September for her homeport, Rainier touched at Yokosuka, and Pearl Harbor before arriving at Concord on 25 October. Throughout the remainder of 1967 and the first half of 1968, Rainier conducted independent underway replenishment exercises and participated in fleet exercises along the southern California coast.

On 29 June, she departed Concord for the western Pacific, arriving at Subic Bay on 21 July. Following a week in port, Rainier got underway for her first replenishment cycle. It was during this first cycle that she was awarded the Battle Efficiency "E" for fiscal year 1968. On 21 November, during her sixth line cycle, Rainier established her best underway replenishment record by transferring 826 tons to USS Camden in a 5-hour period.

By the end of the year, the ship had transferred more than 11,000 tons in support of carriers, their escorts, and SAR vessels in the Gulf of Tonkin and to gunfire support and coastal surveillance units operating along South Vietnam's coast.

Rainier returned to Concord in February 1969 and following 6 months of operations along the west coast, once again deployed for the western Pacific. Upon completion of her last tour off Vietnam in January 1970, Rainier sailed for home and preparation for inactivation. She was decommissioned and struck from the Navy list on 7 August 1970.

Rainier earned four battle stars during the Korean War and eight off Vietnam.

== See also ==
- Vincent O'Rourke, Commanding officer Rainier 5 August 1966 to 2 August 1967.
