= Operation Proud Deep Alpha =

Part of the Vietnam War (1971)

- Part of the Vietnam War
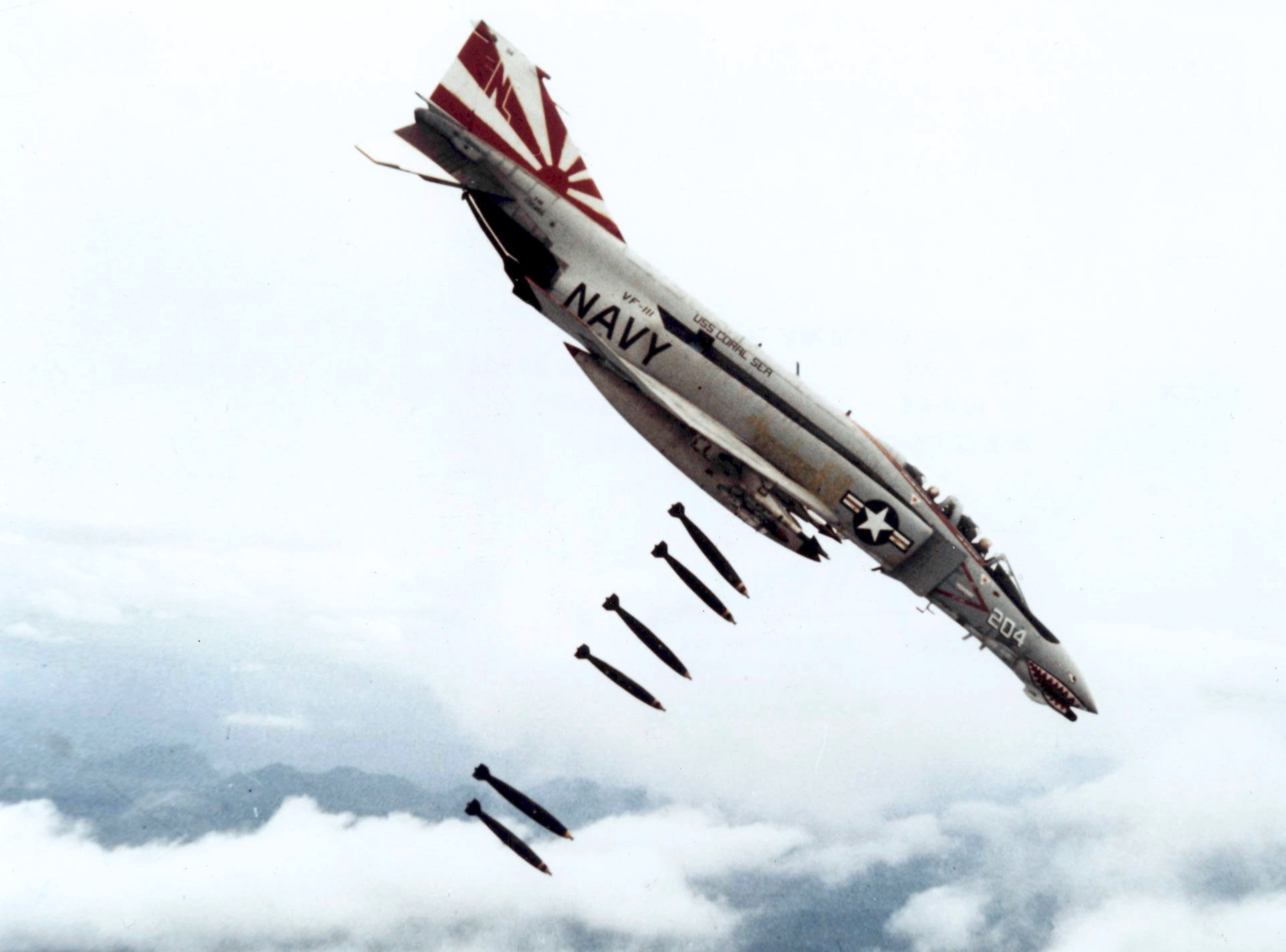
- VF-111 F-4B bombing North Vietnam
Date	26–30 December 1971
Location	Over North Vietnam below the 20th parallel
Result	Inconclusive

Belligerents
United States	North Vietnam

Commanders and leaders
John D. Lavelle; William P. Mack	Phung The Tai; Nguyen Van Tien

Casualties and losses
3 killed 2 captured 3 aircraft destroyed	Unknown; 2 aircraft destroyed

Operation Proud Deep Alpha was a limited aerial bombardment campaign conducted by the United States (U.S.) Seventh Air Force and U.S. Navy against North Vietnam from 26 to 30 December 1971, during the Vietnam War.

== Background ==
In November 1971, aerial reconnaissance revealed more Vietnam People's Air Force (VPAF) MiG fighter deployments to several airfields in lower North Vietnam. On 20 November a VPAF MiG fired a missile at a cell of B-52 bombers attacking the Ban Karai Pass. This threat spurred Chairman of the Joint Chiefs of Staff Admiral Thomas Moorer to direct CINCPAC to consolidate two existing plans: Fracture Deep, formulated in July 1971 and Proud Bunch, proposed on 18 November 1971. The new, revised plan, called Proud Deep incorporated the main objectives of the original plans:

- Destruction of MiGs on the ground and attainment of a level of damage of Bái Thượng and Quang Lang Air Bases sufficient to inhibit further use of these bases by the VPAF for MiG operations against B-52s and gunships in Laos; and
- Destruction of logistical and other military targets in North Vietnam south of the 18th parallel north, with priority on targets of greatest importance to the enemy as storage and supply for his logistics system in Laos.

The decision to go ahead with the plan was still not forthcoming by mid-December, weather being the overriding factor. Meanwhile, between 16 and 19 December, in separate Operation Barrel Roll air actions supporting a desperate stand by General Vang Pao’s forces near Long Tieng, Laos, three F-4 Phantoms were lost. Two fell to anti-aircraft fire and the third was evading a Surface to air missile (SAM). On 18 December a VPAF MiG-21 downed the first U.S. aircraft since June 1968, a USAF F-4D flying a combat air patrol over the north, approximately 70 miles (110 km) west/northwest of Bái Thượng. On the same day two USAF F-4s searching for the crew of the downed aircraft were engaged by two MiG-21s, ultimately resulting in the ejection of the two F-4 crews for lack of fuel and loss of their aircraft. COMUSMACV immediately forwarded another plea to execute the Proud Deep plan: "In view of recent hostile MiG activity culminating in the loss of F-4 aircraft this date, strongly recommend execution Proud Deep."

Admiral Moorer, sent the execute authority the next day. It widened the target area to all valid military targets in North Vietnam south of the 20th parallel (rather than just the four airfields and targets south of the 18th parallel as in the original plan), but restricted the duration of the strike to 72 hours rather than the five days provided in the plan. This operation, re-christened Proud Deep Alpha was the biggest attack and deepest penetration of North Vietnam since the end of Operation Rolling Thunder in November 1968. It has been argued that the operation was timed for the Christmas holiday period to preempt any anti-war protests on university campuses.

== Operation ==
Over 200 USAF and US Navy planes conducted 1025 sorties striking targets as close as 75 miles (121 km) south of Hanoi.

Although Christmas Day had been clear, the weather closed down on the morning of 26 December just as two flights of USAF F-4s were approaching the Thanh Hóa barracks and truck repair shop. The attackers got under a 1,500 feet (460 m) cloud ceiling and lost an F-4, apparently to ground fire. The rest of the five-day operation had to be conducted through clouds. For the USAF, which conducted two thirds of the strikes, this meant the use of LORAN bombing. Effective LORAN bombing required photography annotated to show the target's exact relationship with the navigation beacons, but this painstaking work had not yet been done for most of North Vietnam. In any case, the greater the distance from the beacons, the lower the accuracy. The Navy relied on radar-equipped A-6A Intruders pathfinders leading A-7E Corsairs and F-4s to deliver ordnance. Neither methodology produced good results. Based on bomb damage assessment photography, the USAF estimated that only 25 percent of the bombs dropped hit anywhere near their targets.

The strike on Quang Lang Air Base was among the most accurate, with more than 160 craters appearing in photographs after about two hundred bombs had been dropped. But even here the Pierced steel planking runway was broken in only fourteen places and was quickly repaired. East German television indicated that two MiG–21s were blown on their backs. As to the thirteen buried gasoline tank farms attacked that week, estimates of destruction ranged from a total of 194,000 gallons up to 870,000 gallons out of a capacity of about 3,500,000 gallons.

There were 45 confirmed and two possible SAM firings during the operation. The Navy lost two aircraft in an attack on Vinh on 30 December, SAMs downed an A-6A from VA-165 operating from the USS Constellation and an F-4B from VF-111 operating from USS Coral Sea. One A-6 crewman was rescued by a helicopter from HC-7, but the other crewman was killed and the F-4 crew captured.

Secretary of Defense Melvin Laird, in justifying the operation at a 27 December news conference, cited among other reasons the fact that in the month of December more U.S. planes of all types had been attacked by North Vietnam than in any month since he assumed office in January 1969. Domestic reaction to the bombing became intense in some quarters. Democratic Party election opponents to President Richard Nixon called the bombing a desperate attempt to salvage the President's wrecked Vietnamization policy and 31 members of the House of Representatives telegraphed the President, labelling the raids "a reversion to the discredited bombing policy of the past." China condemned the attacks on 30 December as did the Soviet Union the following day.

== Aftermath ==
Aside from indicating that the Nixon administration might be willing to resume full-scale bombing of North Vietnam, the operation did not achieve very impressive results. The VPAF campaign aimed precisely at countering the U.S. air interdiction campaign to which the President had keyed all his hopes for success, in making North Vietnam give up the fight and negotiate and in giving Vietnamization the time and opportunity to work. But North Vietnam had, in effect, accepted the President's air challenge. Three U.S. airmen were killed, two captured and three aircraft destroyed. North Vietnam claimed to have shot down 24 aircraft and captured seven pilots.

In an interview of U.S. Navy aircrews on the Coral Sea in early January, an F-4 navigator described the operation as "Sheer insanity... The clouds were so solid we couldn't see the ground, but the SAMs could still see us." While another described the operation as "a farce."
