= Operation Thunderhead =

American amphibious mission during the Vietnam War

Operation Thunderhead was a highly classified combat mission conducted by U.S. Navy SEAL Team One and Underwater Demolition Team 11 (UDT-11) in 1972. The mission was conducted off the coast of North Vietnam during the Vietnam War to rescue two U.S. airmen said to be escaping from a prisoner of war prison in Hanoi. The prisoners, including Air Force Colonel John A. Dramesi were planning to steal a boat and travel down the Red River to the Gulf of Tonkin.

Lieutenant Melvin Spence Dry was killed on the mission. He was the last SEAL lost during the Vietnam War. His father, retired Navy Captain Melvin H. Dry, spent the rest of his life trying to learn the circumstances surrounding his son's death. The details, however, were long shrouded in secrecy.

== Mission ==
In April 1972, SEAL Team One left Subic Bay in the amphibious-transport submarine USS Grayback. The plan was to launch the team at night from the submerged submarine in a Swimmer Delivery Vehicle (SDV) piloted by two UDT-11 operators and head for a small island off the mouth of the Red River.

On 3 June 1972, Lieutenant Dry decided to conduct a clandestine reconnaissance mission that night. Shortly after midnight the team launched from Grayback but a combination of navigation errors and strong current took them off course. After an hour, the crew was compelled to abort the mission. They were unable to locate Grayback and they were forced to scuttle their underpowered SDV after its battery power was exhausted.

The next morning, the team was rescued a few miles off the coast. The four men were flown to the USS Long Beach, Operation Thunderhead's command ship.

At 2300 hours on 5 June, the men were to be transported back to Grayback by helicopter. The team would perform a night water drop next to the submarine. During briefings with the pilots, Lt. Dry and Chief Warrant Officer (CWO) Philip L. "Moki" Martin emphasized the maximum limits for the drop were 20/20—20 feet of altitude at an airspeed of 20 knots, or an equivalent combination.

When the helicopter arrived near Grayback's expected position, they could not locate the submarine. As they desperately searched for the submarine's beacon, Lt. Dry and his men prepared to enter the water and lock into the submerged submarine.

According to a post-mission assessment, Lt. Dry informed the helicopter crew that they were too high, too fast, and downwind. Specifically, they were approaching the drop point with the winds, estimated at 15 to 20 knots, on the helicopter's tail. The velocity of the tail wind, added to the helicopter's forward speed, was well beyond the 20-knot ground speed needed for a safe jump. "They wanted us out, and we felt the altitude was too high and the speed too fast," recalled CWO Martin, an experienced parachute jumpmaster." As drop-master, I was looking for the tell-tale signs of spray from the helo—either coming in the door or when I looked toward the rear and below the helo."

According to CWO Martin, the drop was conducted downwind, adding another 15 to 20 knots of forward velocity when the jumpers hit the water. Lt. Dry died immediately of "severe trauma to the neck" caused by impact with the water, according to the Navy's death report. Two other team members were badly shaken, and one was seriously injured.

Several hours earlier, Grayback launched its second SDV but the team abandoned their mission when their air ran out; subsequently, they made an emergency free ascent to the surface. After seeing a strobe light and hearing voices, the two teams rendezvoused.

At about 0100, they found Lt. Dry's lifeless body, inflated his life vest, and held him in tow as they swam seaward to be rescued. An HC-7 helicopter rescued the men at dawn and returned them to the Long Beach.

On 12 June, the remaining team members were transferred back to Grayback. With the likelihood of a successful prisoner escape by sea lessened by the recent U.S. mining of North Vietnam's ports and rivers, Operation Thunderhead was soon terminated.

Because the mission was classified, the Navy did not acknowledge Dry's death as a combat loss until February 2008, when he was posthumously awarded the Bronze Star for Valor.
