= Aloysius G. Casey =

United States Air Force general (1932–2020)

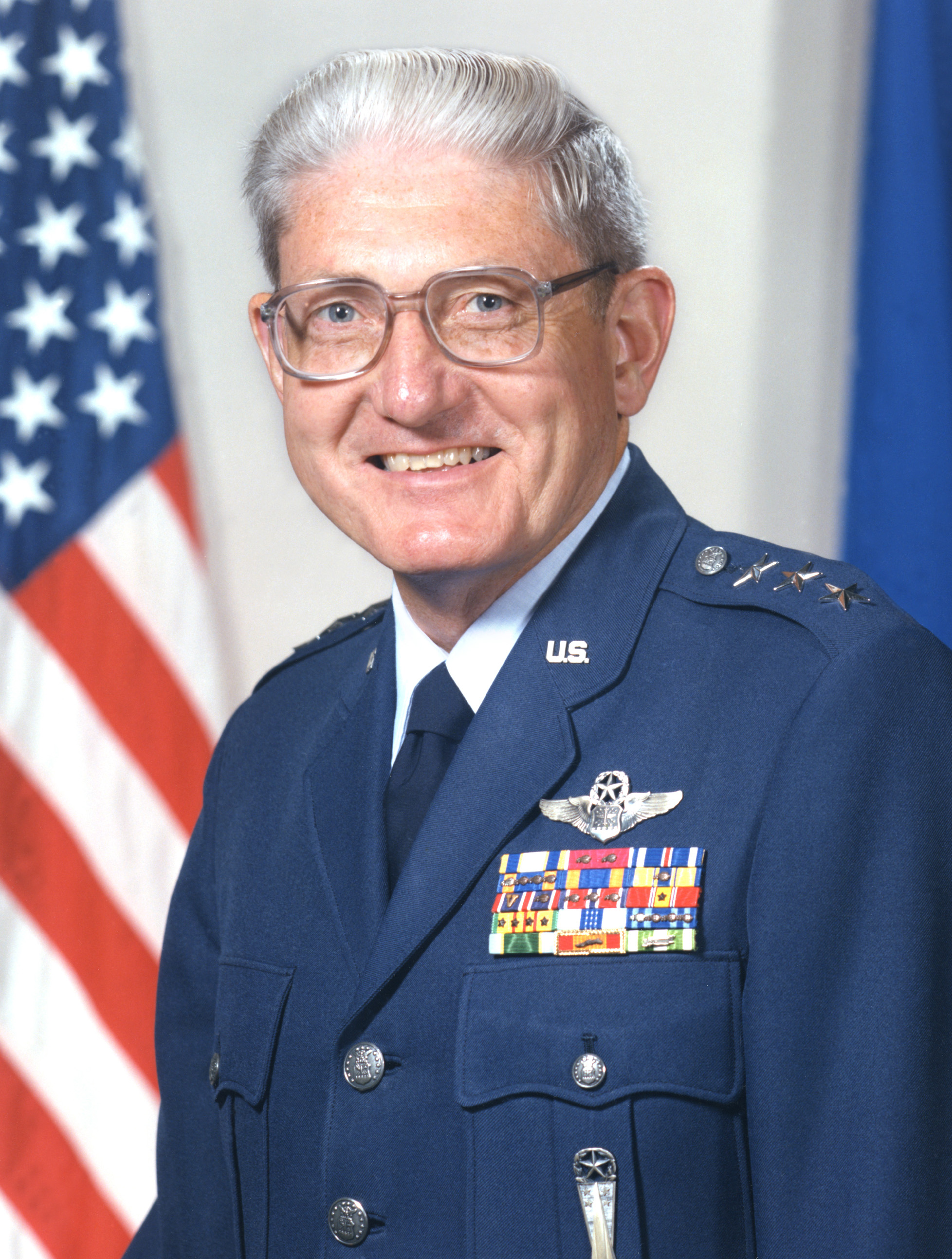
- Born: March 1, 1932; Childs, Pennsylvania, US
- Died: June 10, 2020 (aged 88); Redlands, California, US
- Military career
- Allegiance: United States of America
- Branch: United States Air Force
- Service years: 1954–1988
- Rank: Lieutenant General
- Awards: Distinguished Service Medal; Legion of Merit (3); Flying Cross; Air Medal (10); Air Force Commendation Medal (2)

Aloysius Gerald Casey (March 1, 1932 – June 10, 2020) was a lieutenant general in the United States Air Force who served as commander of the Space Division, Air Force Systems Command at Los Angeles Air Force Base, California. He was responsible for managing the research, design, development and acquisition of space launch, command and control, and satellite systems.

== Biography ==
Casey was born in 1932 in Childs, Pennsylvania and raised in Carbondale, Pennsylvania, where he graduated from St. Rose High School in 1949. After one year at the University of Scranton, he entered the U.S. Naval Academy and graduated with a Bachelor of Science degree in engineering in 1954. He earned a Master of Science degree in astronautics from the Air Force Institute of Technology in 1964. He completed Squadron Officer School in 1962 and the Air War College in 1973.

He received his commission in 1954 and was assigned as a guidance and control officer with the Matador tactical missile training program at Lowry Air Force Base, Colo. He then became commander of a field training detachment at Orlando Air Force Base, Florida. In July 1956 he attended navigator-bombardier training at Ellington Air Force Base, Texas, and continued his training at Mather Air Force Base, California, from September 1957 to March 1958. He then was assigned to B-47 combat crew duty at Pease Air Force Base, where he served on a combat crew and as a member of a select crew until August 1963, receiving a spot promotion to major.

After graduating from the Air Force Institute of Technology in September 1964, Casey was assigned as a propulsion project officer, Ballistic System Division, Norton Air Force Base. He managed the development of the third-stage rocket motor for the Minuteman III strategic missile system. He entered upgrade training in the AC-119K night flying gunship at Lockbourne Air Force Base, Ohio, in February 1969 and subsequently was assigned to Southeast Asia for combat duty in July 1969. Casey flew 130 combat missions, principally road interdiction, as a navigator in the side-firing gunship. In October 1970 he was assigned to Wright-Patterson Air Force Base, Ohio, where he served as director of configuration management for the B-1, B-1 System Program Office, and later as director of projects, A-10 System Program Office.

Casey was assigned to the Minuteman System Program Office, Norton Air Force Base, as director of engineering from January 1975 to September 1975, when he was appointed assistant deputy for Minuteman. In October 1976 he was assigned as assistant deputy for Missile X and in October 1979 he became MX program manager. During Casey's tour of duty as MX program manager, the system moved from advanced development into full-scale engineering development. He transferred to Air Force Systems Command, Andrews Air Force Base, Md., in July 1980 as assistant deputy chief of staff for systems. He became deputy chief of staff for systems in October 1981. He returned to Air Force Systems Command, Norton Air Force Base, in May 1982, serving as Peacekeeper program director and commander of the Ballistic Missile Office. He assumed his present command in October 1986.

He is a master navigator with more than 3,000 flying hours and wears the Master Missile Badge. His military decorations and awards include the Distinguished Service Medal, Legion of Merit with two oak leaf clusters, Distinguished Flying Cross, Air Medal with nine oak leaf clusters, and Air Force Commendation Medal with oak leaf cluster. Casey was awarded the 1984 Dr. Theodore Von Karmen Award from the Air Force Association for his contributions to science and engineering. In 1985 he received the Air Force's Eugene M. Zuckert Management Award for his outstanding management of key Air Force missile programs.

He was promoted to lieutenant general October 8, 1986, and retired on July 1, 1988. Casey and his son Patrick were instrumental in the restoration of fellow USAF general John D. Lavelle's four star rank in 2007. He died on June 10, 2020, at the age of 88.

Casey was married to Mary Patricia (Casey) Casey (February 27, 1931 – June 30, 2012). They had three sons, nine grandchildren and, as of 2020, four great-grandchildren. Casey and his wife were interred at Arlington National Cemetery.
