= John D. Lavelle =

United States Air Force general (1916–1979)

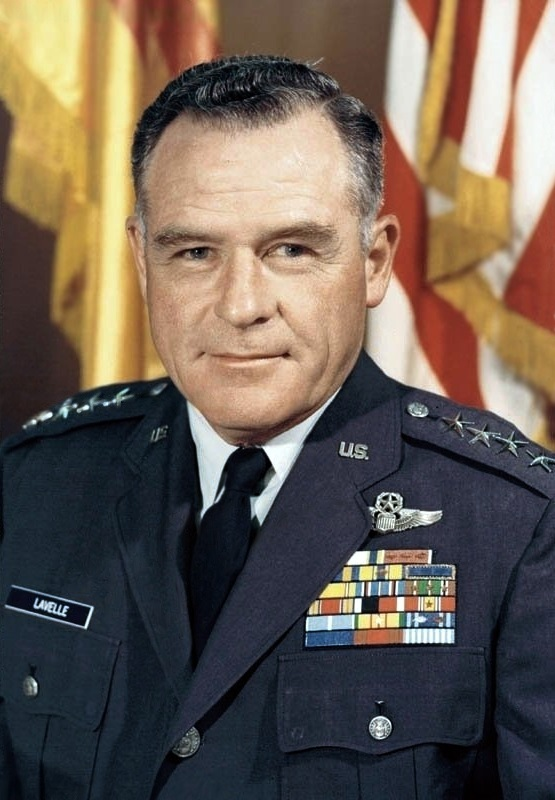
- Then-General John D. Lavelle
- Born: September 9, 1916; Cleveland, Ohio, US
- Died: July 10, 1979 (aged 62); Fairfax, Virginia, US
- Burial place: Arlington National Cemetery
- Military career
- Allegiance: United States
- Branch: United States Army; Army Air Corps; Army Air Forces; United States Air Force
- Service years: 1939–1947 (Army); 1947–1972 (Air Force)
- Rank: General (Retired as Lieutenant General)
- Nickname: Jack
- Commands: Seventh Air Force; Seventeenth Air Force
- Conflicts: World War II; Korean War; Vietnam War
- Awards: Air Force Distinguished Service Medal; Legion of Merit (4); Air Medal (2)

John Daniel Lavelle (September 9, 1916 – July 10, 1979) was a United States Air Force general and commander of Seventh Air Force, with headquarters at Tan Son Nhut Air Base, Republic of Vietnam. Lavelle was removed from his position in 1972 and forced to retire due to alleged misconduct over bombing missions during the Vietnam War while serving as the Seventh Air Force commander. Since the ranks of general and lieutenant general are temporary ranks and linked to their corresponding position of assignment, federal law at the time required senatorial approval for an officer to retire at these higher ranks. Due to these allegations the Senate refused to confirm Lavelle's retirement as a four-star or three-star general. Lavelle was reverted and retired at his permanent two-star rank of major general.

On August 4, 2010, President Barack Obama nominated Lavelle posthumously for promotion back to the grade of general on the Air Force retired list in light of the release of declassified information that showed that Lavelle had been authorized by President Richard Nixon to conduct the bombing missions. The Air Force Board for Correction of Military Records found no evidence Lavelle caused, either directly or indirectly, the falsification of records, or that he was even aware of their existence. Once he learned of the reports, Lavelle took action to ensure the practice was discontinued. The nomination to restore his four-star rank was recommended by the Air Force Board for Correction of Military Records, the Secretary of Defense and the Secretary of the Air Force. However, the Senate Armed Services Committee declined to vote on the nomination, allowing it to expire without action at the end of the legislative session. On December 23, 2024, President Joe Biden signed the 2025 NDAA into law, which included a clause to elevate Lavelle's retired rank to lieutenant general, but the clause also notes that his retired rank can't be elevated above that. The NDAA provision relies on a recommendation in 2015 not accepted in a reconsideration by the Air Force Board for Correction of Military Records in 2017, which renewed its recommendation for advancement to the grade of general.

== Early life and education ==
Lavelle was born on September 9, 1916, in Cleveland, Ohio, where he attended Cathedral Latin High School, and graduated from John Carroll University in 1938 with a bachelor of science degree. In 1939 he enlisted as an aviation cadet in the U.S. Army Air Corps and received pilot training at Randolph and Kelly Fields, Texas. He received his pilot wings and a commission as a second lieutenant in June 1940.

Lavelle married Mary Josephine McEllin on June 22, 1940.

== Career ==
=== World War II ===
Lavelle returned to Randolph Field as a flying instructor and in 1942 was assigned as part of a cadre to open Waco Army Airfield, where he served as squadron commander and director of flying. During World War II he saw combat in the European Theater of Operations, where he served with the 412th Fighter Squadron. He flew 76 combat missions in the P-47 Thunderbolt.

The 412th Fighter Squadron was part of the 373d Fighter Group, composed of the 410th, 411th and 412th Fighter Squadrons. The Group was constituted on May 25, 1943 and activated on August 15, 1943. The Group trained for combat in P-47s.

The 373d Fighter Group deployed to England in March 1944 where it was assigned to the 9th Air Force. The Group flew its first combat mission on May 8, 1944, a fighter sweep over Normandy. The Group then took part in preinvasion activities, the P-47s escorting B-26s to attack air fields, bridges, and railroads in France.

When the Allies launched the Normandy invasion on June 6, 1944, the 373d Fighter Group's P-47s patrolled the air over the beachhead, and hit troops, tanks, roads, fuel depots, and other targets in the assault area until the end of the month.

The 373d Fighter Group moved to France in July 1944 where it struck railroads, hangars, boxcars, warehouses and other objectives to prevent reinforcements from reaching the front at Saint-Lô, where the Allies broke through on July 25, 1944. The Group bombed such targets as troops in the Falaise-Argentan area in August 1944.

During the Battle of the Bulge, December 1944 – January 1945, the 373d Fighter Group concentrated on the destruction of bridges, marshalling yards and highways. It flew reconnaissance missions to support ground operations in the Rhine Valley in March 1945, hitting airfields, motor transports, etc. The Group continued tactical air operations until May 4, 1945.

On March 23, 1945, then-Major Lavelle was credited with damaging four enemy aircraft on the ground.

The 373d Fighter Group returned to the United States in August 1945 and was inactivated on November 7, 1945.

=== Post-World War II ===
In January 1946, Lavelle was assigned to Headquarters Air Materiel Command at Wright Field, Ohio, as Deputy Chief of Statistical Services. When the U.S. Air Force was established as a separate Service in 1947, he was one of the two Air Force officers who negotiated with all seven Army Technical Services and wrote the agreements for the division of assets and the operating procedures to be effected during the buildup of the Air Force.

Lavelle was assigned in October 1949 as the Director of Management Analysis And later as the comptroller of the Far East Materiel Command at Tachikawa Air Base, Japan. During the Korean War, he was made commander of the Supply Depot at Tachikawa. In this assignment, he was awarded the Legion of Merit for the reorganization of the theater supply system and the establishment of a procedure for control of the transshipment of supplies direct from the United States to Korea.

In November 1952, Lavelle was assigned as commander of McGuire Air Force Base in New Jersey, and the 568th Air Defense Group. During his tenure there, the Military Air Transport Service facilities and air terminal were constructed and McGuire Air Force Base became an East Coast aerial port. When the base was transferred to MATS, he became the MATS Transport Wing commander. While at McGuire Air Force Base, he established a community relations program which did much to ease the problems that normally befall an area where a military installation grows from approximately 1,500 to 10,000 personnel, becoming an honorary member of the local Lions International and Kiwanis Club.

Lavelle attended the Air War College in 1956–57 and then spent the next five years at Headquarters U.S. Air Force as deputy director of requirements; secretary of the Weapons Board; and deputy director of programs. While in the Pentagon, he was principally responsible for the reorganization of the Air Force Board system and the establishment of program control through the Program Review Committee and the Weapons Board. He was awarded an oak leaf cluster to his Legion of Merit at the end of this tour of duty.

Lavelle went to Europe in July 1962 as deputy chief of staff for operations, Headquarters Fourth Allied Tactical Air Force, NATO, which was composed of numbered Air Force-size elements of the German, French and Canadian Air Force and the U.S. Air Forces in Europe. For his accomplishments while in this headquarters, he was awarded a second oak leaf cluster to his Legion of Merit and the Médaille de Mérite Militaire by France.

In September 1964, Lavelle was assigned to Headquarters U.S. Air Force as the director of aerospace programs, Deputy Chief of Staff for Programs and Resources. As director, he was principal backup witness in presenting and defending Air Force programs to the Congress after such programs had been approved by the secretary of the Air Force and the secretary of defense. In addition, he served as chairman, Air Staff Board, and as chief, Southeast Asia Programs Team.

Lavelle was assigned as Commander of the Seventeenth Air Force, headquartered at Ramstein Air Base, West Germany in July 1966. Seventeenth's operations spanned Germany, Italy, and Libya. In this position, Lavelle commanded a versatile, combat-ready force equipped with supersonic jet fighters and tactical missiles with nuclear, conventional and air-to-air capabilities. Seventeenth Air Force was a NATO-committed major subcommand of USAFE, one of America's strongest overseas air arms and a primary instrument of Western defense.

Secretary of the Air Force Harold Brown, on one of his visits to 17th Air Force at Ramstein, had several briefings by then-Major General Lavelle. Brown was reportedly astounded by Lavelle's detailed knowledge of specifications and functioning of every element of weapons systems and operations.

In December 1967, Lavelle was assigned to the Defense Communications Planning Group located at the United States Naval Observatory, Washington, D.C., where he served as the Deputy Director for Forces. In February 1968 he assumed duties as the director of the Defense Communications Planning Group. The appointment was made by Secretary of the Air Force Harold Brown and carried with it promotion to Lieutenant General. The Defense Communications Planning Group (DCPG) ran the secret development of seismic and acoustic sensors to detect truck traffic on the roads that made up the Ho Chi Minh Trail in Laos. It was also known as the Igloo White Project. The idea was the brainchild of the Scientific Advisory Board and embraced by Secretary of Defense Robert S. McNamara, who made it a priority development under the direct control of Brown and using primarily Air Force funds to budget it.

With his close relationship with Brown and knowing that McNamara wanted to accelerate the Igloo White operational date, Lavelle was able to divert valuable Air Force assets to his program. This put him in direct conflict with General John D. Ryan, then the Air Force Vice Chief of Staff. Ryan had little control over Lavelle, who had direct access to DOD and Brown. Also, Lavelle was able to bypass 7th Air Force in Saigon and personally direct many operations at Task Force Alpha located at Nakhon Phanom Royal Thai Air Force Base, Thailand. Task Force Alpha was the infiltration-surveillance center where sensor data relayed through EC-121 aircraft was processed by large computers. The speed, direction, number, and location of the truck traffic, as well as transshipment and storage areas were sent to Forward Air Controllers to direct immediate strikes and to 7th Air Force for subsequent bomber targeting as part of Operation Arc Light.

In September 1970, Lavelle was assigned as vice commander in chief, Pacific Air Forces, with headquarters at Hickam Air Force Base, Hawaii. He served in that capacity until assuming command of Seventh Air Force in South Vietnam on July 29, 1971.

=== Vietnam War ===
The Seventh Air Force in South Vietnam controlled most of the Air Force aircraft in the Vietnam War. Lavelle was promoted to four-star general when he assumed command.

Seventh Air Force headquarters were at Tan Son Nhut Air Base, Saigon. In addition to commanding Seventh Air Force, Lavelle served concurrently as deputy commander for air operations, Military Assistance Command, Vietnam (MACV). As Seventh Air Force commander, he was responsible for all Air Force combat air strike, air support and air defense operations in mainland Southeast Asia. In his MACV capacity, he advised on all matters pertaining to effective use of tactical air support and coordinated Vietnamese Air Force and U.S. air operations of all units in the MACV area of responsibility.

Lavelle arrived in Saigon on August 1, 1971. As commander of 7th Air Force, he had operational control of Air Force units based in both South Vietnam and Thailand. By that time, Vietnamization, Nixon's policy of transferring responsibility for the war to the South Vietnamese, was well along, and US forces were steadily withdrawing.

Operation Rolling Thunder, the air war against North Vietnam, had ended in November 1968. The Johnson Administration suspended bombing to induce North Vietnam to join peace negotiations. However, reconnaissance flights continued over North Vietnam. In November 1968, less than a month after the end of Rolling Thunder, the North Vietnamese shot down a reconnaissance aircraft. When Nixon was inaugurated in January 1969, he maintained the policy not conducting air strikes against North Vietnam. However, the U.S. Air Force continued intensive airborne reconnaissance of the North, and fighter escorts were assigned.

The rules of engagement in late 1971 prohibited US warplanes from firing at targets in North Vietnam unless US aircraft were either: (1) fired at; or (2) activated against by enemy radar. In those cases, the escorts could carry out so-called "protective reaction" strikes. These rules of engagement were based on the situation in 1968, when North Vietnam's surface-to-air missiles were controlled by fire control radars with a high-pulse recurring frequency, which keyed an alarm in the US aircraft. By late 1971, shortly after Lavelle had taken command of 7th Air Force, the North Vietnamese had begun networking their long-range search radars with the missile sites. These additional sources of radar data allowed North Vietnam to turn on SAM radar at the last second, giving US aircrews virtually no warning.

US combat commanders believed it vital to let US aircraft defend themselves by attacking SAM sites and MiG airfields rather than waiting for a SAM site to launch a missile or a MiG to attack. Communiqués from the COMUSMACV, General Creighton Abrams, to the Joint Chiefs of Staff (JCS) in Washington sought authority to destroy the MiG threat and recommended immediate strikes on Bai Thuong, Quan Lang, and Vinh airfields. The JCS denied these requests, but urged commanders to make maximum use of authority allowable under existing Rules of Engagement.

On November 8, 1971, Admiral Thomas H. Moorer, the Chairman of the Joint Chiefs of Staff, arrived in South Vietnam and personally approved a request from Lavelle to attack the MiG airfield at Đồng Hới. Moorer even reviewed the bomb damage assessment results that day, before departing. Mission results also went to the Pentagon. Instead of questioning the mission, the JCS only suggested more careful planning.

In a top-secret November 12 message to Moorer, Admiral John S. McCain, Jr., Commander-in-Chief of the U.S. Pacific Command (Abrams' boss), warned, "I am deeply concerned over the mounting threat that the enemy's integrated air defense network has posed against the B-52 force." He said that "the enemy is more determined than ever to shoot down a B-52." On November 21, McCain sent another top-secret communiqué to Moorer, asking again for more authority to bomb North Vietnamese targets. McCain made specific reference to the preplanned strikes previously authorized by Moorer himself. Moorer, in a top-secret November 28 response, expressed understanding, but declined to grant additional authority.

Secretary of Defense Melvin R. Laird visited South Vietnam on 8 December and met privately with Lavelle in Saigon. At this meeting, Lavelle later asserted, Laird "told me I should make a liberal interpretation of the rules of engagement in the field and not come to Washington and ask him, under the political climate, to come out with an interpretation; I should make them in the field and he would back me up." In 2007, Laird confirmed giving this direction to Lavelle. Lavelle said he conveyed this information to Abrams, and "General Abrams said he agreed with Secretary Laird."

==== Existing Rules of Engagement ====
The rules on what pilots were allowed and not allowed to do were called Rules of Engagement. The rules were changed often and were not transmitted in a neat list. They consisted of a compilation of wires, messages, and directives. "We have a saying we used in Vietnam, that we finally found out why there are two crew members in the F-4", Lavelle said later. "One is to fly the airplane and one is to carry the briefcase full of the rules of engagement." Many of the rules of engagement for air combat dated to 1968. These rules, which had been directed by then-President Lyndon Johnson and his Secretary of Defense Robert McNamara, were bureaucratic and highly restrictive. As General William C. Westmoreland, COMUSMACV from 1964 to 1968, related in his memoirs:

In 1965, we observed the construction of the first surface-to-air (SAM) sites in North Vietnam, and the military sought permission to attack them before they were completed to save American casualties. Assistant Secretary of Defense for International Affairs John McNaughton ridiculed the idea.

"You don't think the North Vietnamese are going to use them!" he scoffed. "Putting them in is just a political ploy by the Russians to appease Hanoi." It was all a matter of signals, said the clever civilian theorist in Washington. "We won't bomb the SAM sites, which signals to North Vietnam not to use them." But our enemies were not playing Washington's silly games. A month later the United States lost its first aircraft to a SAM.

By 1971 Johnson and McNamara were long gone. However, many of the restrictions imposed by the Johnson-McNamara rules of engagement were still in effect in Vietnam. Forbidden targets included any North Vietnamese fighter base designated as a sanctuary, a fighter aircraft that did not have its landing gear retracted, any fighter not showing hostile intent, and any SAM site not in operation. A SAM had to be fired at a U.S. plane before the plane could fire back.

=== Lavelle's modifications to the rules of engagement ===
Lavelle sent word to his fighter units that if their planes were shot at, they were to shoot back. They shouldn't wait for the SAMs to become operational and start shooting their 'flying telephone poles.' The fighter pilots were told to hit transporters and SAM sites under construction. Lavelle viewed such pre-emptive actions essential due to changes in North Vietnamese air defense tactics. As a subcommittee of the House Armed Services Committee would later report:

In late 1971, the North Vietnamese took several actions which vastly improved and augmented their tracking capability. The most important was netting of their early warning and surveillance radar and their anti-aircraft artillery radar with SAM missiles. In that netted mode, the Fan Song (radars) which alerted U.S. pilots to the surveillance never came up, as the surveillance could all be conducted with the other radars. General Lavelle believed that, with those mutually supporting radar systems transmitting tracking data to the firing sites, the SAM missile system was activated at U.S. aircraft at any time they were over North Vietnam.

The JCS in 1970 had restated the basic protective reaction authority, empowering fighters "to strike any SAM anti-aircraft artillery site in North Vietnam below 20 degrees north which fired at or was activated against US aircraft conducting missions over Laos or North Vietnam."

Lavelle said his deputy was also to relax the rules of engagement during a conference in Honolulu in January 1972. Lavelle did not attend himself, but sent his vice commander, Major general Winton W. Marshall. Lieutenant general John W. Vogt, Jr., director of the Joint Staff, told Marshall that "field commanders were, in the opinion of the Chairman of the Joint Chiefs of Staff [Moorer], not nearly as aggressive as they should have been." In a written statement submitted to the Senate, Lavelle said that Marshall reported that Vogt said that "field commanders had not been flexible enough in the use of existing authorities" and that "JCS would not question our aiming points (targets) on protective reaction strikes."

==== Conduct of air war ====
At the time that Lavelle arrived in South Vietnam, the North Vietnamese were concentrating forces and equipment near the Demilitarized Zone, preparing for what would shortly become known as the Easter Offensive. Lavelle's air reconnaissance crews provided a regular flow of reports and photographs chronicling its progress. The North Vietnamese had become increasingly active. Between November 1971 and February 1972, more than 200 SAMs were fired at US aircraft, compared to about 20 for the same interval a year before. The number of incursions by MiG fighters into South Vietnam and Laos increased by a factor of 15.

The North Vietnamese also netted their SA-2 Fan Song fire-control radars with their Bar Lock, Whiff, and Spoon Rest ground control intercept (GCI) radars. The GCI radars could feed the tracking data to Fan Song, which then did not have to be turned on until after missile launch. The Radar Homing and Warning (RHAW) gear carried by the American aircraft provided warning when the aircraft were being tracked by the Fan Song, but could not detect emissions from the GCI radar. Thus pilots had little or no warning of a missile attack. The GCI radars were always on, and, in Lavelle's opinion, that redefined the "activated against" criterion for protective reaction strikes. "As far as I'm concerned, from November on, no airplane ever went into North Vietnam when the system wasn't activated against them", Lavelle said later.

Lavelle gave orders that whenever U.S. aircraft were in North Vietnam, crews were to assume the air defense system was activated against them and so they were authorized to fire. Lavelle also authorized planned protective reaction strikes. Targets for the planned protective reaction strikes sometimes went beyond elements of the air defense system. Lavelle later told Congress that he could have hit some of the targets within the rules of engagement by "trolling," sending aircraft into hostile areas as bait to provoke enemy fire. The Navy used the practice but Lavelle said that he did not do so and regarded it as too dangerous to his aircrews.

By December 1971, Lavelle's reconnaissance flights had provided strong evidence that North Vietnam was preparing a massive conventional attack on the South. However, combat losses during these reconnaissance missions heightened Lavelle's concern about the operating rules and the effect on his crews. On December 18, the 432nd Tactical Reconnaissance Wing lost three aircraft to enemy action, two to ground fire and one to MiG attack.

Early in 1972, a strike into North Vietnam again raised the issue of authority for preplanned protective reaction strikes. A ground control intercept radar at Mộc Châu, used to control MiGs, had proven to be a major threat as it tracked slow-moving US gunships. Abrams personally authorized a preplanned strike. On January 5, 1972, US aircraft struck and disabled the Mộc Châu site. When informed, the JCS took a dim view of the Mộc Châu raid. The JCS, in a message to U.S. commanders, conceded "the logic" of the attack. "However, we are constrained by the specific operating authorities as written."

U.S. aircraft losses continued to mount. On January 17, 1972, the North Vietnamese shot down two AC-130 gunships operating over the Ho Chi Minh Trail. Three days later, the 432nd Tactical Reconnaissance Wing lost an RF-4C reconnaissance aircraft.

==== Charges of falsification of reports ====
On January 23, 1972, 7th Air Force intelligence learned that the North Vietnamese planned to attack "a large aircraft" that night, presumably B-52s which would be flying against targets on the Ho Chi Minh Trail in Laos. The North Vietnamese deployed a flight of their best pilots to Đồng Hới, just north of the DMZ, to conduct the attack against the B-52s. Lavelle decided to destroy the MiGs or foil their plans under the guise of a protective reaction strike.

Intelligence reported that the MiGs had taken off from Hanoi, and 7th Air Force put up its strike flights. Weather closed in around Đồng Hới, but Lavelle, who was in the command post personally directing the operation, ordered his pilots to cut the runway at Đồng Hới so the MiGs couldn't land. The pilots reported that the target had been hit with no enemy reaction.

Lavelle then told his deputy for operations, Major general Alton T. Slay, that "We cannot report 'no reaction.' Our authority was protective reaction, so we had to report there was some enemy action." Lavelle viewed the operation of the enemy GCI radar as the enemy action that he was responding to. However, Lavelle later confirmed that he did not explain this rationale to Slay.

Slay communicated this direction to the unit which had flown the strike, the 432nd Tactical Reconnaissance Wing at Udorn Royal Thai Air Force Base, Thailand, commanded by Colonel Charles A. Gabriel. The wing's vice commander was Colonel Jerome F. O'Malley. The wing had one reconnaissance squadron and two F-4D fighter squadrons, which meant the wing could carry out both strike and reconnaissance.

Slay told Gabriel and O'Malley, "You must assume by General Lavelle's direction that you have reaction." At subsequent preflight briefings, crews were told to record enemy "reaction", whether or not it happened. While most of the missions caused real reaction—SAM, AAA, or MiG fire, a few did not. On those occasions, crews reported "hostile enemy fire" anyway. However, Lavelle meant for the crews to report enemy radar, not fire.

The intelligence office at the 432nd subsequently began falsifying after-action intelligence reports to indicate enemy action. Lavelle did not find out about the falsification until March. Lavelle contended that the falsification of the intelligence report was mis-interpretation of his direction. A total of four false intelligence reports were filed.

The missions in question were all flown against enemy air defenses, specifically missile sites, missiles on transporters, airfields, 122mm and 130mm anti-aircraft guns, and radars. At the time, the USAF was flying only reconnaissance missions over North Vietnam, not bombing or interdiction missions. However, the Rules of Engagement as interpreted by Lavelle allowed striking enemy assets that threatened the reconnaissance flights.

Nixon, in a February 3, 1972 conversation with Ambassador Ellsworth F. Bunker, explained that he did not want to publicize Lavelle's liberal interpretation of the Rules of Engagement.

You've worked out the authority. He can hit SAM sites, period. OK? But he is not to do it with a public declaration. All right? And, if it does get out, to the extent it does, he says it's a protective reaction strike. He is to describe it as protective reaction. And he doesn't have to spell it out. They struck, that's all he needs, a SAM site. A protective reaction strike against a SAM site.

The details of this February 3, 1972 Nixon directive never became public.

=== Continuation of planned protective reaction ===
On February 5, based on the intelligence of the enemy's continued buildup and the positioning of his major troop units, Abrams decided that the enemy offensive had in fact begun. MACV brought to bear on the enemy buildup everything it had—within the still restrictive rules of engagement. Tactical air sorties, gunships and B-52 strikes were brought in practically nonstop. A 48-hour maximum effort was begun, concentrating all available airpower against the B-3 Front in the Central Highlands. Then, after a 24-hour cease-fire for the Tết holiday, the same maximum effort was applied in Military Region 1 in the north.

"We've got a 24-hour flow of aircraft now", Lavelle confirmed, "and we can keep the flow now. It's set up, it's scheduled, so there's something every few minutes. And we just keep it coming and change the target area, so whenever General Abrams makes a decision as to where to put the weight of effort, or where to go next, we've already got the flow of aircraft."

On February 16, the Pentagon announced orders suspending any prestrike need for enemy reaction. On the same day, Lavelle sent a reconnaissance aircraft and 14 escorting fighter-bombers into North Vietnam. The first wave of US aircraft struck the defending SAM sites and another struck heavy gun emplacements north of the DMZ. MACV officials portrayed these as "protective reaction" strikes. They announced that the sole objective was to strike positions in North Vietnam that had previously fired on American airplanes.

On February 25, Lavelle ordered three more preplanned protective reaction missions using 17 escort aircraft. These types of raids went on unabated for another week or so. The preplanned missions were flown on March 1, 3, 4, 6, 7, and 8.

When, despite Abrams' expectations, the enemy still had not attacked, the U.S. air action became an issue. After a visit from Peter Osnos of the Washington Post, Abrams said, "The wicket he appears to be on is that, for some insidious political reason, we have created the myth of this impending campaign."

== Lavelle Affair ==
Lavelle's alleged changes to the rules of engagement and the falsification of the reports resulted in a media firestorm that became known as the "Lavelle Affair."

=== Investigation ===
The unraveling of the false intelligence reports began with 23-year-old Sergeant Lonnie D. Franks of Cedar Rapids, Iowa. who was an intelligence specialist for Gabriel's wing at Udorn. Two days after the strike on the MiG runway, on January 25, 1972, Franks debriefed an F-4 pilot and navigator who had flown a reconnaissance mission. They said they had not received any ground fire or hostile reaction, but had been instructed nevertheless to report hostile reaction. Franks checked with his supervisor, Technical Sergeant John Voichita, who told him to fabricate the necessary details. According to Franks, he was told to "make it look real", and "just make up some sort of hostile reaction." Franks then asked the intelligence officer in charge, Captain Douglas Murray, who confirmed the instructions and said the orders came from the wing director of intelligence. Franks created an intelligence report that said 10 to 15 rounds of 23mm anti-aircraft artillery had been fired at the reconnaissance crew. Other such instances followed.

Franks wrote to his Senator, Harold Hughes of Iowa, a Democrat who was a member of the Senate Armed Services Committee. Franks told the Senator that "we have been reporting that our planes have received hostile reactions such as AAA and SAM firings, whether they have or not. We have also been falsifying targets struck and bomb damage assessments." Hughes had a copy of the letter hand-carried to Air Force Chief of Staff General Ryan on March 8. Franks' identity was initially concealed by Congress but was eventually leaked to the New York Times.

Ryan sent the Air Force inspector general, Lieutenant general Louis L. Wilson, Jr., to Saigon to investigate.' Lavelle told Wilson that he interpreted the rules of engagement liberally, as he had been told to do. He explained why he regarded the air defense system as always being activated against any aircraft flying into North Vietnam, thus providing grounds for protective reaction strikes. He told people in the command that they could not report "no reaction" to a mission over North Vietnam. Lavelle was reportedly astounded when Wilson showed him the intelligence reports with false data. He said he had never seen these reports before and had not known the detail that was required to complete one. He had assumed that a general statement about enemy reaction would suffice. Wilson concluded that Lavelle had exceeded his command authority. Wilson specifically pinpointed 147 sorties into North Vietnam that violated the war's Rules of Engagement. The bombings had been reported as protective reaction strikes when, in fact, there had been no enemy firings.

On March 21 Moorer sent a top secret message to 7th Air Force, warning that "the increased number of protective reaction strikes since Jan 1, 1972 has attracted a considerable amount of high-level interest here and is receiving increasing attention from the press." Moorer emphasized the "extreme sensitivity" of this subject and asked that all crews be "thoroughly briefed that current authority permits protective reaction to be taken only—repeat only—when enemy air defenses either fire at or activated against friendly forces."

=== Recall to Washington ===
On March 23, Wilson reported his findings to Ryan, who immediately recalled Lavelle to Washington. Lavelle arrived in Washington on March 26. Lavelle was accused of filing four false reports and conducting 28 unauthorized bombing raids (out of a total 25,000 sorties flown) against enemy air defense positions. Lavelle said that he had been encouraged by the Secretary of Defense and others to interpret the rules of engagement liberally and that the reports were falsified by subordinates who misconstrued his instructions. Ryan offered Lavelle two options: another assignment as Major general (i.e., loss of two stars), or retirement with a reduction to three-star rank of Lieutenant general. Lavelle chose to retire as a three-star. Lavelle indicated he wished to speak directly with either Laird or Secretary of the Air Force Robert C. Seamans, Jr. Ryan agreed that Lavelle would meet with one of the two. Lavelle spent the following week at the Pentagon waiting in vain for an audience. Realizing he would not succeed in overturning the decision, Lavelle agreed to retirement.

On April 7, the Pentagon announced that Lavelle had retired "for personal and health reasons." Lavelle had genuine medical problems—-heart murmur, emphysema, and a disc problem that caused aggravated pains in his hips and legs. He'd been approved for disability retirement.

On May 4, Rep. Otis Pike (D-N.Y.) called for a Congressional investigation. Pressed by Congress and the news media, the Pentagon issued a revised statement on May 15. Ryan said that Lavelle "had been relieved of command of the 7th Air Force by me because of irregularities in the conduct of his command responsibilities." However, the House Armed Services Committee appointed a special subcommittee to investigate Lavelle's retirement.

=== House Armed Services Committee hearings ===
The Lavelle hearings in the House of Representatives began on June 12, 1972 and lasted only one day. The Armed Services Investigating Subcommittee of the House Armed Services Committee heard testimony from Ryan and the now-retired Lavelle. The morning session was open to the public, but the afternoon session was closed to allow discussion of classified information.

The Department of Defense refused to provide the committee with the Rules of Engagement. However, Ryan provided a summary of the rules for fighter aircraft.

Lavelle acknowledged that he had made what he termed "a very liberal interpretation" of the Rules of Engagement in ordering his pilots to strike threats in North Vietnam. One of the committee members asked if Lavelle would do it again. "Absolutely", Lavelle replied. "The strikes were specifically directed at air-defense targets, where the buildup had increased in preparation for the invasion."

Lavelle testified that his liberalized interpretation of the Rules of Engagement did not allow the striking of every target of opportunity. He said that, "We went in after those targets... which would hurt the enemy's defense system, so that we could operate." Lavelle cited the example of a January 1972 observation of 55 to 60 tanks 11 miles (18 km) north of the DMZ. He refused authorization to strike the tanks, saying, "There is just no way we can make any liberalized interpretation that would authorize that strike."

Ryan and Lavelle disagreed over the number of protective reaction strikes flown under the liberalized rules. Ryan said there were 28, while Lavelle said there were 20 or fewer. Ryan estimated that the strikes totaled about 147 sorties (out of approximately 25,000 sorties during that period), and that all were directed against missile sites, missiles on transporters, airfields, 122mm and 130mm anti-aircraft guns, and radars. Lavelle informed the subcommittee that there were no civilian-populated areas involved, and the no American planes or lives were lost in these strikes.

Asked if Abrams was aware of the missions, Lavelle replied, "I believe General Abrams knew what I was doing." Lavelle specifically recalled telling Abrams about his plan to strike trucks containing missiles and associated equipment.

Ryan testified that from the 28 missions, a total of four false intelligence reports had been filed (reports from the other 24 missions had not been falsified). Ryan told the subcommittee members that Lavelle's instructions were the "impetus" behind the falsified reports.

Lavelle assumed full responsibility for reporting the strikes as protective reaction, but testified he was not aware of the four falsified after-action intelligence reports until they were brought to his attention by the Inspector General on March 9, 1972. He stated, "I accepted responsibility for it even though I did not do it and did not have any knowledge of the detail. It was my command and I should have known.".

Lavelle agreed but said that "the impetus for what went into that report stems from me by my stating that we could not report 'no reaction.' Now there is a difference here between that and a false report." Lavelle added that "my instructions were not clear and were subject to misinterpretation and, in retrospect, were apparently interpreted by my subordinates as an exhortation to report enemy fire when there was none. 'Hostile action, enemy radar,' would, in my judgment, have been an accurate report."

In closed session as a result of security constraints, U.S. Representative William Dickinson (R-Alabama) told Lavelle, "I am not sure why we are here today. But I think, if I had been in your position, I would have done the very same thing. And if that means stretching the rules is part of it, then good for you." Dickinson blamed the "crazy rules for this crazy war which has no parallel or anything to compare with it." However, Democratic senator William Proxmire of Wisconsin urged the Air Force to court-martial Lavelle, who, although retired, could still be recalled to active duty to stand trial.

=== Nixon's reaction ===
Nixon was furious about what he regarded as false accusations against Lavelle. On Wednesday, June 14, in a nearly half-hour Oval Office meeting, then President Richard Nixon discussed the Lavelle affair with National Security Advisor Henry Kissinger. As described in an article by Lieutenant general (ret.) Aloysius Casey and Patrick Casey, Nixon asked Kissinger about Lavelle repeatedly.

The President began: "Let me ask you about Lavelle. I was, I had it on my list this morning. I just don't want him to be made a goat. We all know what protective reaction is. This damn Laird." [Nixon evidently was responding in line with the views of Kissinger, who blamed Laird for the removal of Lavelle.]

Then Kissinger said: "And he had him already removed by the time I even learned about it."

Nixon asked, "Why did he even remove him? You, you destroy a man's career."

Kissinger did not answer the question, but rather took up a different topic. Nixon, however, interrupted: "Come back to Lavelle. I don't want a man persecuted for doing what he thought was right. I just don't want it done."

Still, Nixon does not receive a satisfactory answer from his national security advisor. The President continued:

"Can we do anything now to stop this damn thing or ... Why'd he even remove him?"

"Lavelle was removed at the end of March", Kissinger noted.

"Because of this?" asked Nixon.

"Yeh", said Kissinger.

Nixon was furious: "Why the hell did this happen? A decision of that magnitude, without— I should have known about it, Henry. Because this is something we told— You remember: We, we, we told Laird, 'Keep pressure on there in March.'"

Kissinger criticized the generals. "Of course the military are impossible, too... They turn on each other like rats."

Nixon said, "Laird knows goddamn well, that ah, I told him, I said, 'It's protective reaction.' He winks, he says, 'Oh, I understand.'"

Kissinger replied, "Yeah, but Laird is pretty vicious."

On June 26, 1972, Nixon and Kissinger again discussed Lavelle. As described by the Caseys, "Nixon was recoiling from advice that he steer clear of any involvement in the forthcoming Senate inquiry into Lavelle's actions."

"Frankly, Henry, I don't feel right about our pushing him into this thing and then, and then giving him a bad rap", Nixon declared. "You see what I mean?" The discussion eventually concludes with Nixon expressing anxiety about the Senate hearing. "I want to keep it away if I can", the President says, "but I don't want to hurt an innocent man."

=== Media reaction ===
The reaction from the news media to the Lavelle affair was harsh. In "The Private War of General Lavelle", Newsweek described a "widespread conspiracy" in which "scores of pilots, squadron and wing commanders, intelligence and operations officers, and ordinary airmen were caught up in the plot." Time magazine, in an article entitled "Lavelle's Private War" charged that Lavelle had "made the extraordinary decision to take matters into his own hands."

George C. Wilson of The Washington Post said, "What Lavelle did—-taking a war into his own hands—-has obviously grave implications for the nation in this nuclear age." There was speculation that other senior officials were implicated. "Was Lavelle the only bad apple?" Nina Totenberg asked in the National Observer.

Tom Wicker of The New York Times said, "numerous 'protective reaction' raids on North Vietnam have been staged to let American fliers bomb what they wanted to bomb, when they wanted to bomb it." Seymour Hersh of the New York Times wrote that the case "raised grave questions about the Nixon Administration's grip on command and control over the skies of Southeast Asia."

=== Senate hearings ===
The Senate Armed Services Committee also investigated the Lavelle affair. The Senate hearings lasted from September 11 to September 22, 1972.

The Senate Armed Services Committee, chaired by Democratic Senator John Stennis of Mississippi, questioned Lavelle and Ryan and also called several witnesses to testify, including Moorer and Abrams, who was called home from Saigon to testify. Other witnesses included Admiral John S. McCain, Jr., former commander-in-chief of United States Pacific Command, General Slay, Colonel Gabriel, Captain Murray, the intelligence officer who was ordered to falsify the reports, and Sergeant Franks, the intelligence specialist who had reported the falsification of the intelligence reports.

Ryan testified that the actual after-action report was not the falsified intelligence reports but a special category (specat) report. "The wing commander later submitted on this type of strike, a Specat, a special category message to 7th Air Force and said, 'This is what we really hit,'" This report was "a message that does not come to the normal distribution centers."

The wing commander, Colonel Gabriel, was asked by Senator Stennis, what he thought about filing the false intelligence reports. Gabriel replied, "My conjecture was... it goes to the world, the OPREP-4—-and I assume there was somebody on the loading list [distribution list] that did not have a need to know, and the full report would be filed with the special report that was sent in at night."

Gabriel's conjecture about the intelligence reports was reasonable if inaccurate. Official records often used cover stories for other operations that were not what they seemed. The White House and Pentagon had been lying for several years about airstrikes in Laos. From 1964 to 1970, the government claimed that US forces were flying only "armed reconnaissance" missions in Laos, with aircraft authorized to return fire if fired upon. In actuality, the Air Force and the Navy were flying hundreds of combat strike missions a day in Laos.

The secret bombing of Cambodia in 1969–70 had used similar deception. All communications were split along two paths. One route was overt, ordering typical B-52 missions that were to take place within South Vietnam near the Cambodian border. The second route was covert, utilizing back-channel messages between commanders ordering the classified missions.

During questioning, Republican Senator Barry Goldwater of Arizona, himself a retired Major general and Command Pilot in the Air Force Reserve, asked Lavelle, "You didn't have the authority to hit a MiG because it was sitting on an airfield below the 19th parallel?

"Yes, sir, that's right," replied Lavelle. "It's a hell of a way to run a war," Goldwater said."

Lavelle told the Senators that he lost planes and crews on two occasions when, without the North Vietnamese SAM using its own radar which U.S. pilots could detect, the networked system guided missiles to kills. That, argued Lavelle, constituted sufficient rationale for planned strikes in the name of protective reaction. "The system was constantly activated against us", he testified.

Time Magazine reported that Lavelle's raids "were in clear violation of the White House rules then in force on bombing North Vietnam. The White House apparently did not agree with Time's assessment. During the Senate hearings, on September 15, 1972, Nixon met in the Oval Office with Alexander Haig, his deputy national security advisor. As described by the Caseys, "Nixon, running for re-election, apparently felt frustration at his inability to correct the injustice he thought he was witnessing in the daily Senate testimony on the Lavelle issue."

The President told Haig, "We've got to be able to do something on this ah, this Lavelle."

Haig responded: "I don't think so, sir. I've been watchin' it."

The President said, "We told Laird that, 'If your guy Moorer isn't sure if it is protective reaction, that to protect yourselves, we would back you to the hilt.' [That's] the way I look at it."

For all that, the White House remained silent as the Senate hearings progressed.

Abrams, who had not been privy to Lavelle's meeting with Laird, told the Senate hearing that Lavelle "acted improperly." Abrams at the time was facing Senate confirmation as Army Chief of Staff.

=== Retirement controversy ===
The official purpose of the Senate Armed Services Committee hearing was to determine what rank Lavelle should hold upon retirement. Ranks above major general were considered temporary, requiring Senate confirmation for each position held. Retirement at a grade above major general also required Senate confirmation, which was usually granted routinely.

Ryan told the committee that Lavelle's "service as a four-star general was not satisfactory and did not warrant retirement in that grade." However, his service as a lieutenant general was outstanding and the Air Force recommended his retirement in that grade.

The Senate Armed Services Committee on Oct. 6, 1972 turned down Lavelle's nomination for retirement as a lieutenant general by a vote of 14 to two. Instead, Lavelle was retired at his permanent rank of major general. His official retirement date was April 7, 1972.

== Aftermath of the Lavelle Affair ==
The North Vietnamese launched the Easter invasion of South Vietnam on March 30, 1972, a week after Lavelle's recall. The USAF resumed bombing of North Vietnam.

The issue of whether the Lavelle missions were authorized was lost amid bigger stories—Nixon's re-election, the collapse of the Paris peace agreement, and the Watergate scandal.

=== Nixon's continuing frustration ===
More than two weeks after the Senate Hearings, Nixon was still upset about the Lavelle incident. In an Oct. 23, 1972 meeting with Haig in the Old Executive Office Building, Nixon unleashed a torrent of anger.

"All of this goddamn crap about Lavelle", said Nixon. "And I feel sorry for the fellow, because you and I know we did tell him about protective reaction being, very generally—"

"Very liberal", Haig helpfully suggested.

"Yeh, very liberally, very liberally", said Nixon. "Remember, I said it was, if they, if they hit there, go back and hit it again. Go back and do it right. You don't have to wait till they fire before you fire back. Remember I told Laird that. And I meant it. Now Lavelle apparently knew that, and received that at some time."

=== House Armed Services Committee report ===
The Armed Services Investigations Subcommittee report, which was not issued until December 15, 1972, largely exonerated Lavelle. With regard to Lavelle, the subcommittee evaluated two questions, 1) were the strikes authorized? and 2) was Lavelle responsible for the falsification of intelligence reports? In answer to the first question, the subcommittee concluded the following:

The Subcommittee finds it difficult to fault "pre-planning," in itself. After all, the 7th Air Force has flown enough sorties over North Vietnam to be able to predict with a high degree of accuracy precisely what kind of a reception to expect from the enemy. In view of this, the failure to adequately brief the pilots in a manner to insure maximization of the strike's effective and the safety of the crews could be considered a dereliction of duty. Of course, in order to justify an actual attack under the Rules, the enemy would have to fire at or be activated against our aircraft. This raises the question: What is meant by "activated against"? Obviously, it does not refer to actual firing since radar tracking constitutes "activation."

On the second question about the falsification of the intelligence reports, the subcommittee accepted Lavelle's contention that the falsification resulted from a mis-interpretation of his guidance.

It is understandable how General Lavelle's statement that "we cannot report 'no reaction'" could have been interpreted as an order to file a false report by one who strictly construed the Operating Authorities of Rules of Engagement, since such construction would virtually require visible evidence that the enemy was taking hostile action against U.S. planes. In effect, it gave the enemy the right to throw the first punch.

However, as has been noted above, it was General Lavelle's firm conviction that the enemy's greatly improved radar/missile network permitted U.S. planes to be placed in extreme jeopardy without advance warning and that, therefore, common sense and the law of survival compelled the assumption that SAM/AAA sites in North Vietnam were always "activated against" U.S. or allied aircraft. General Lavelle expressed the opinion that this assumption was valid and that the strikes which he authorized were permissible under the then-existing Rules of Engagement and Operating Authorities. Therefore, his statement that "We cannot report no reaction", when interpreted in the light of this assumption, might reasonably suggest an entirely different conclusion than that reached by the strict constructionist.

…It should be pointed out, in fairness to General Lavelle, that at the time of the Subcommittee hearing, there were only four reports from the disputed strikes which were identified as containing false information.

The subcommittee criticized the policy of providing "virtual sanctuary" to the "whole of that enemy nation since 1968." The subcommittee stated that "This radical departure from orthodox military doctrine placed U.S. forces at a tremendous tactical disadvantage and contributed to prolonging the war."

The subcommittee report also excoriated the Department of Defense for not releasing the Rules of Engagement and other relevant documents. The report suggested that the DoD was trying to hide something other than Lavelle's conduct.

=== Secret bombing of Cambodia ===
According to author William Shawcross, the secret the Air Force was trying to protect was probably the secret bombing of Cambodia, which came to light in 1973.

The bombing of Cambodia was under the control of the USAF Strategic Air Command (SAC), rather than Lavelle's 7th Air Force. The secret Cambodian bombing began October 4, 1965.

The commander-in-chief of SAC at the time the secret Cambodia bombings began in 1965 was Ryan, who in 1972 forced Lavelle to retire over 28 questionable missions flown over North Vietnam.

=== Attempts to block promotions for officers involved in Lavelle Affair ===
For several months in 1973, Senator Hughes held up promotions for 160 Air Force and Navy officers who might have had "material evidence regarding unauthorized air strikes" in Southeast Asia but eventually gave it up. The false reporting system authorized by Nixon for the bombing of Cambodia was revealed in 1973, undercutting Hughes' campaign against Lavelle's subordinates.

Slay, Gabriel, and O'Malley, who implemented the false reporting for the Lavelle missions, were all later promoted to four-star general. Gabriel served as Air Force Chief of Staff from 1982 to 1986. and died in 2003. O'Malley was killed in a plane crash in 1985.

=== The Nixon Tapes ===
In February 2007, Lieutenant general (ret.) Aloysius Casey and his son Patrick Casey published an article in Air Force Magazine about the Lavelle affair. The article quoted recently released Nixon tapes that confirmed that Nixon had authorized the liberal interpretation of the Rules of Engagement as implemented by Lavelle.

In a letter responding to the Casey article, former Secretary of Defense Laird confirmed that he had authorized Lavelle to implement a liberal interpretation of the Rules of Engagement. Laird stated,

Prior to my order, there was no authorization (under McNamara or Clifford) to destroy dangerous targets except when fired upon without special permission. General Bus Wheeler, Admiral Tom Moorer, and General Abrams all agreed with the liberal interpretation on my order on protective reaction. The new orders permitted hitting anti-aircraft installations and other dangerous targets if spotted on their missions, whether they were activated or not.

Laird took issue, however, with the ensuing falsification of intelligence reports.

Aloysius and Patrick Casey responded to Laird's letter with the following:

Although 35 years late, Mr. Laird's admission fully vindicates the truthfulness of General John D. Lavelle before the United States Congress. Moreover, there is no evidence to support Mr. Laird's suggestion that General Lavelle encouraged or directed pilots to lie about coordinates on missions or falsify reports.

Seymour Hersh, who had been critical of Lavelle in 1972, wrote a follow-up article in 2007 in the wake of the Caseys' revelation. Hersh conceded that Lavelle's "...authorization came from the Oval Office; the Caseys found the evidence that Lavelle had done and continued to do what the President wanted in recently released Nixon White House tapes..."

== Retirement ==
After retirement, Lavelle lived in Oakton, Virginia, with his wife, Josephine, and family.

In retirement, Lavelle stuck to his position. The strikes were within the rules of engagement because the air defense radars were constantly activated against his aircraft. A liberal interpretation of the rules had been encouraged. He did not intend for the reports to be falsified. The USAF had been "hasty" in relieving him.

In an oral history interview in April 1978, Lavelle said that the inquiry had been neither thorough nor fair. "If anybody really wanted the total story or wanted the true story, no effort was made to gather it by historians, by the Senate, by the press, by the Air Force."

In the interview, recorded by the Air Force History Office, Lavelle said that he should not have acted on the basis of private assurances that he would be supported if the missions became known. He added, "Somewhere along there we just should have said, 'Hey, either fight it or quit, but let's not waste all the money and the lives the way we are doing it.'"

Lavelle's son, John D. Lavelle, Jr. wrote in 2007:

My father was heartbroken, and I saw him physically and mentally broken by the ordeal. He fought back with the help of my mother and recovered his strength, confidence, and pride before he died of a heart attack five years later. In the end, I think he found comfort in knowing that what he did saved some airmen's lives, and that was worth more to him than four stars.

== Death ==
Lavelle died on July 10, 1979 after suffering a heart attack on a golf course in Fairfax, Virginia. He was buried at Arlington National Cemetery.

== Awards ==
Lavelle was a command pilot. His military decorations and awards include the Air Force Distinguished Service Medal, Legion of Merit with three oak leaf clusters, Air Medal with oak leaf cluster, and Air Force Commendation Medal with oak leaf cluster.

- Air Force Distinguished Service Medal
- Legion of Merit with three oak leaf clusters
- Air Medal with oak leaf cluster
- Air Force Commendation Medal with oak leaf cluster
