= Helicopter Combat Support Squadron Seven =

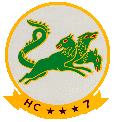
- HC-7 Emblem
- Active: 1967–1975
- Branch: United States Navy
- Nickname: Sea Devils
- Engagements: Vietnam War

Helicopter Combat Support Squadron Seven (HC-7) was a helicopter squadron of the United States Navy established on 1 September 1967 and disestablished on 30 June 1975.

== History ==
Helicopter Combat Support Squadron ONE, (HC-1) was reorganized to create several additional helicopter squadrons. The existing HC-1 Detachments based at NAS Atsugi and NAAF Ream Field, Naval Outlying Landing Field Imperial Beach were redesignated Helicopter Combat Support Squadron SEVEN (HC-7). Established with sixteen officers and seventy-five enlisted men on 1 September 1967. Upon establishment, HC-7 was tasked with multiple missions including Logistics, Vertical Replenishment, Seventh Fleet Flagship, Aerial Mine Countermeasure, Oceanographic, home station search and rescue (SAR) and combat search and rescue (CSAR).

Volunteer crewmen attended Combat Aircrewman Rescue School which included training in "JEST", SERE (search, evasion, resistance, and escape), combat swim school, aerial gunnery/weapons, medical, hand-to-hand combat, 10’-10 mph helo rescue swimmer deployment. HC-7 owed its success to the establishment of the training instructors of "Paramedic Rescue Team ONE", NAS Cubi Point, Republic of Philippines.

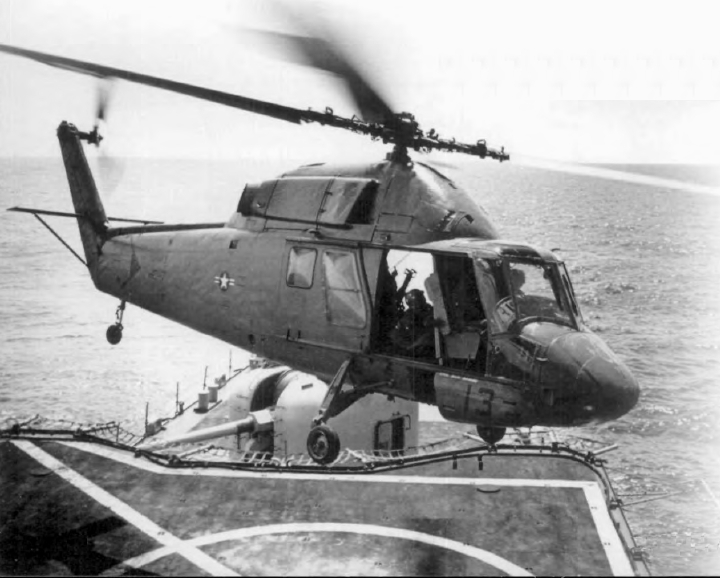
HC-7 UH-2 lifts off from USS Sterett in the Gulf of Tonkin

During Operation Rolling Thunder the Navy maintained units in the Gulf of Tonkin to retrieve downed fliers from the sea and from North Vietnam and Laos. Normally, two destroyers were deployed to the forward, North SAR Station (20°N 107°E) and another two to the South SAR Station (19°N 106°E). To carry out rescues in North Vietnam's lethal environment, one UH-2 Seasprite helicopter equipped with self-sealing fuel tanks, machine guns, and armor was placed on board a ship at each station. Another four similarly armed and armored SH-3A Sea Kings (the primary rescue helicopter) were based on one of the Yankee Station carriers.

As the Vietnam War intensified the squadron deployed 16 separate detachments, constantly on the move, branded with the nickname "The Orphans of the Seventh Fleet". HC-7 helicopters Cross-decked to a new ship on an average of 14 day to a new home as the host ships departed the Gulf of Tonkin. HC-7 was continuously stationed in the Gulf of Tonkin (Squadron, 2216 days – Det 110, 2046 days). HC-7 crews rescued 150 persons, 130 of which were within the Vietnam Combat zone. Two pilots were rescued twice. Five successful rescues took place deep within North Vietnam (feet dry), many rescues occurred along the coast (feet wet) within range of heavy enemy artillery. One of its members, Lieutenant (junior grade) Clyde Everett Lassen received the Medal of Honor. In July 1971 HC-7 was awarded Presidential Unit Citation for the period 1 September 1967 to 30 April 1969 for Extraordinary Heroism.

=== Detachments ===
Beginning with two detachments, increasing to high of sixteen during 1969 then in 1971 as the requirements changed HC-7 condensed to one detachment (110).

Detachment 101 – UH-2A/B – (1970 UH-2C) Seasprite – Blackbeard One – aboard flag ships USS Providence and USS Oklahoma City primary flights for Commander of Seventh Fleet. VIP, non-VIP, mail transfer flights 10 crewmen, rotation of 30–60 days from 1 September 1967 to 1971.

Detachment 102 – UH-46 Sea Knight – Vertical Replenishment – aboard USS Mars (AFS-1), two UH-46s, 22-24 crewmen, rotation of 30–60 days. Continued operations 1 September 1967, departed 27 April 1970 to HC-3. Recorded operations of a 1968 cruise, 79 ships supplied with 943 tons of stores. Also, transporting supplies to inland bases located at Vung Tau, South Vietnam.

Detachment 103 – 1 October 1967, HC-7 assumed duties from HC-1 Detachment Cubi, 1 January 1968- Det 103 Cubi assumed station SAR for NAS Cubi Point. 1 September 1968 redesignated "HC-7 Det Cubi" (configuration / repair / training center, staging area for CSAR detachments). The only permanent detachment. Beginning with 2 officers and 25 enlisted men. Last muster entry 8 August 1974.

Detachments 104, 105, 106, 107, 108 and 109 – UH-2A later HH-2C Seasprite Clementine – Combat Search and Rescue (CSAR). 1 September 1967 to 1971 Stationed aboard DLGs and DDs – North and South CSAR stations. 8-10 crewmen, 30-60 day rotation. Cross-decking on a minimal time frame. Also deployed during the North Korea 1969 EC-121 shootdown incident 15 April 1969.

Detachments 110 and 111 stationed aboard the Yankee Station host carrier. From 18 February 1968 to 24 September 1973, these detachments were continuously (2045 days) stationed in the Gulf of Tonkin. Formed from HS-6's six helicopters aboard USS Kearsarge. Normally 5-6 helicopters and 35-55 men, with all repair equipment, tools, gear, taking four to five flights each. Det 110/111 completed 142 cross decks. Big Mothers pre-positioned prior to air strikes and co-existed with the Clementine crews aboard North and South SAR.

Detachment 110 – HH-3A Sea King – Big Mothers – Combat Search and Rescue (CSAR), approximately 35-55 crewmen and 5 helos, (3 CSAR and 2 Logistic) From 18 February 1968 to 25 September 1973.

Detachment 111 – SH-3A Sea King – Protector – logistics flights aboard host carriers (with Big Mothers). Also deployed from 23 January 1968 to 4 March 1968 as a separate crew in response to the North Korean seizure of the USS Pueblo.

Detachment 112 – UH-46 Sea Knight– Vertical Replenishment – aboard USS Niagara Falls, two UH-46s, 22-24 crewmen, rotation of 40–60 days. Commenced operations 1 January 1969, departed 6 September 1970 to HC-3.

Detachment 113 -RH-3A Sea King – Aerial Mine Counter Measures – aboard USS Catskill, two RH-3As, 32-36 crewmen, rotation of 30–60 days. Mine Manglers arrived 19 February 1969, departed for HC-5 12 August 1970. Provided aerial mine sweeping operation throughout Southeast Asia, and SEATO exercises.

Detachment 114 – No record data.

Detachment 115 – H-34 SeaHorse - logistic support aboard oceanographic ship, USS Maury, South Korea, three deployments during the Spring and Summer of 1969.

Detachment 116 – SH-3A Sea King EC-121 shootdown incident

=== Chronology ===
==== 1967 ====
14 rescues (3 combat, 11 others), 7 helicopters (1220 flight hours)

4 October diverted from an inland attempt, Clementine crew rescues a pilot amongst the cargo ships within Haiphong harbor. The next day, 5 October three attempts to grab inland pilot, code word "LAMB", pilot captured, crew shot down helicopter ditched and crew rescued.

14 October just off of the coast helicopter crew beats out many sampans, second still in raft, helo pilot uses rotor wash to trap raft, crewman drops horse-collar in his lap.

==== 1968 ====
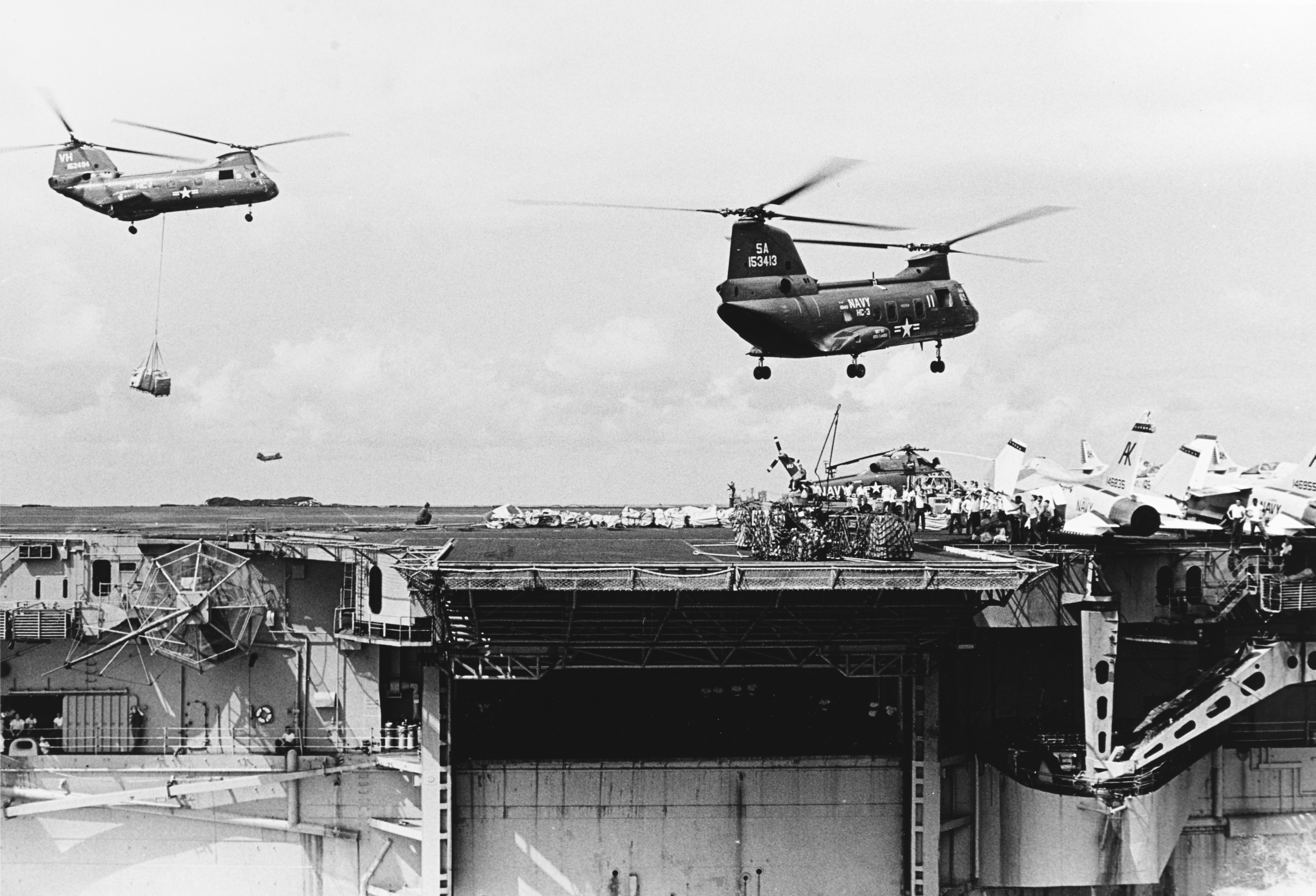
UH-46 Sea Knights from HC-3 and HC-7 resupplying USS Intrepid, December 1968

42 rescues (17 combat, 25 others). Staffing (July) 66 officers, 399 enlisted. 12 helicopters (6950 flight hours)

15 April, heavy artillery, four crewman rescued, swimmers use D ring, hoist pilot and self with one lift.

28 April Combat Night Rescue 4 miles (6.4 km) offshore Clem observes day smoke, both pilots in rafts, pick-up, use M-60 to sink rafts.

On 8 May, they were 18 miles (29 km) inland, 45 minutes in, feet dry, over dense jungle, the pilot could hear helicopters approaching. A battle persisted shortly after, complete with, suppressive fire, no forest penetrator, several tries with horse collar, and an added tight-down chain.

14 May Lieutenant Terry Lee Smith, AE1 Robert Harold Dabel and AO3 Carl Delbert Martin were killed when their UH-2A helicopter crashed at HC-7 Det Cubi - NAS Cubi Point

19 June 7 miles (11 km) inland – 58 minutes feet dry, dense jungle, mountain side, continuous enemy fire, two low hovers in rice paddy, one attempt in tree tops, hit tree, flares cease, again to rice paddy, lights on, success – missile launch, aboard ship, 5 minutes of fuel remaining.

30 August 120 miles (190 km) round trip (7 miles (11 km) from Laos) 30 miles (48 km) inland (straight) 70 minutes feet dry flight along ridge tops, avoid SAM sites, heavy AAA fire entire flight, heavy jungle, crewman held M-16 on hoist cable, M-60s jam several times. Co-pilot M-16s expended rounds hit pilot in face. A-4s suppress flak.

6 September 3.5 miles (5.6 km) inland – 20 minutes feet dry, power descent, find strobe, first pilot in river off island, area well lighted by nearby military base, green tracers everywhere, second pilot upon island, helo turns on light, enemy has him, two more attempts, heavy automatic fire, intensifies

==== 1969 ====
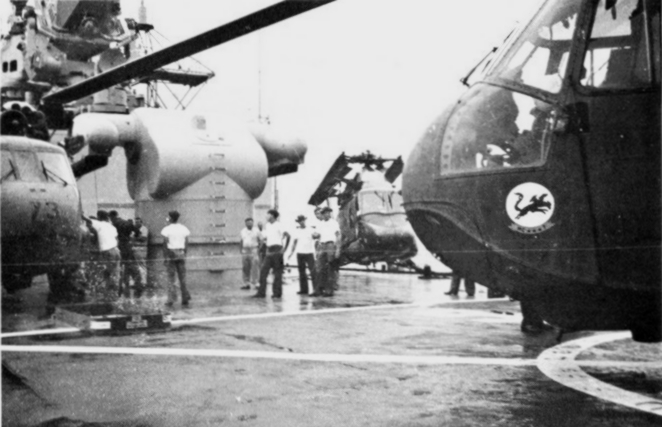
HC-7 helicopters on USS Long Beach c.1969

No command report available 13 rescues (0 combat, 13 others) Staffing – (July) 105 Officers – 562 Enlisted – 24 helos

16 January LT Clyde E. Lassen presented Congressional Medal of Honor by President Lyndon Johnson.

January 1969 HC-7 developed "CSAR Operations and Procedures"; check list, team effort, prepared for unexpected – should not be committed into hostile environment until survivor is located, identified and information, RESCAP available throughout the entire mission. Fly no lower than the highest column that may result from exploding enemy ordnance. "Swimmer in the water" technique (10 feet (3.0 m) altitude/10 knots). Deploy smoke canister as a diversion for artillery shelling, Jinking will reduce the possibility of battle damage. Today, this documentation is supplementing CSAR training within Navy helicopter squadrons. October 1974, HC-7's experiences were compiled within a manual "Combat Search and Rescue Tactics".

==== 1970 ====
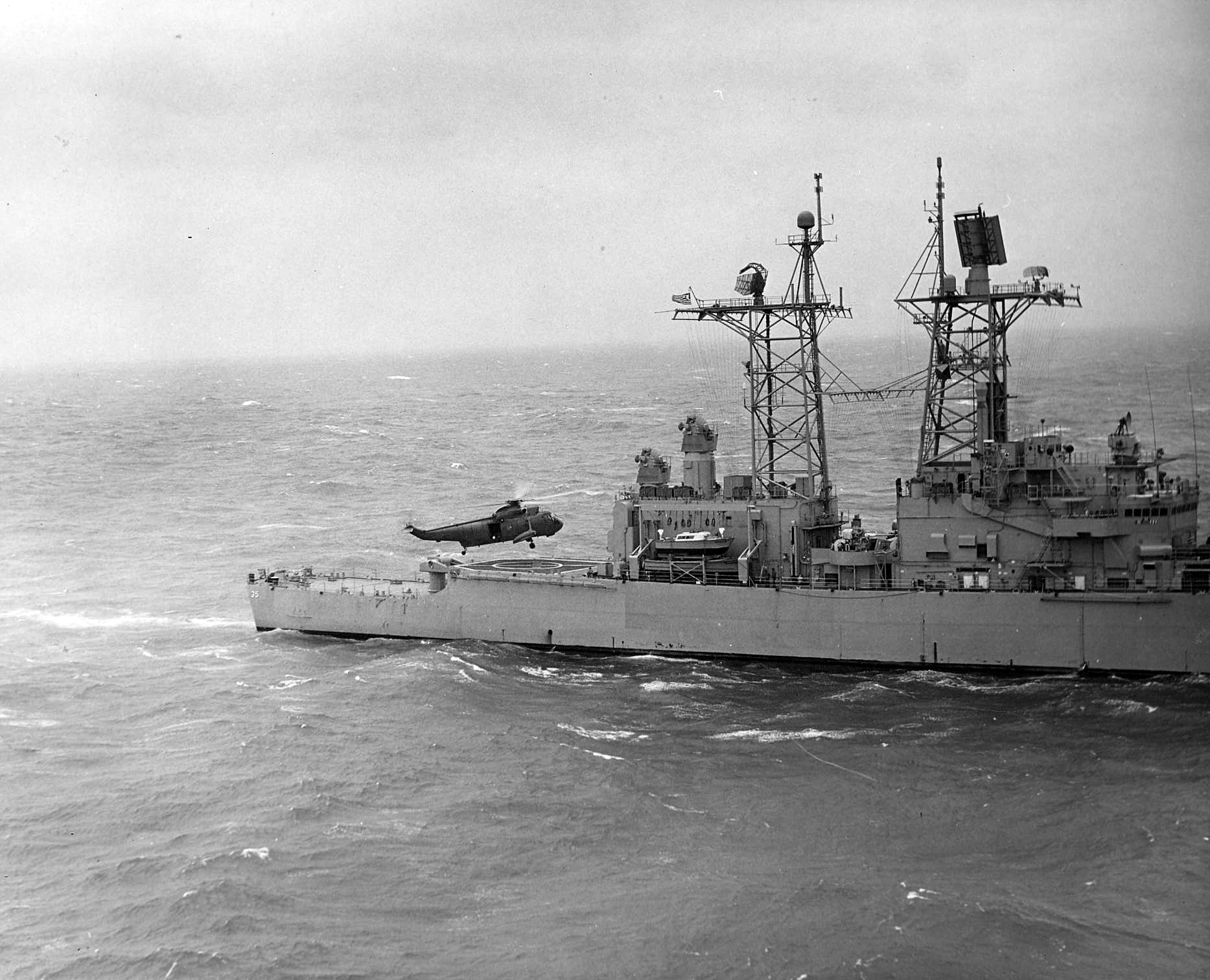
HC-7 HH-3A landing on USS Truxtun off Vietnam c.1970

19 rescues (13 combat (classified), 6 others) Staffing (July) 80 officers, 492 enlisted, 35 helicopters (2660 flight hours)(1017 VIPS)

20 February AZ3 Scott Ferris Moore Jr passenger, perished when an SH-3A helicopter crashed near USS Constellation on Yankee Station.

12 August first (and only) rescue by HC-7 HH-2C, helicopter airborne before pilot hit the water

Naval helicopter squadrons utilize maintenance facilities at HC-7 Det Cubi. HH-3A helos arrive at Det Cubi, having design problems, were not operational by years’ end.

Date unknown inland (classified) rescue/recovery of nine Republic of Vietnam Navy Nasty boat crewmen – sunk boat. Three wounded, three dead.

==== 1971 ====
One rescue (1 combat, 0 other). Staffing (July) 54 officers, 306 enlisted, 47 helicopters.

30 December heavy shelling – badly injured pilot just off enemy island, deploy swimmer, assist pilot, North Vietnamese boats, RESCAP strafed, exploding artillery, large track gun appears from cave on island, rescue hoist cable broke, was debris field, helicopter lands in water – recover swimmer, pull him in, vertical lift, dodging explosions. Search for second pilot unsuccessful, many boats, forced to exit.

==== 1972 ====
58 rescues (45 combat, 13 others). Staffing (July) 49 officers, 277 enlisted, 25 helicopters (4951 flight hours)

9 April CSAR flights doubled – 2-4 helicopters launched to preposition locations for each air strike

12 April mini detachment sent from USA to Tonkin Gulf aboard USS Kitty Hawk

9 May Operation Linebacker begins. Within ten days four helicopters and 138 personnel deployed to Western Pacific. All Navy HH-3As transferred to HC-7. To expedite a United States Air Force C-5A air-lifts two helicopters to Det Cubi.

10 May aces Duke Cunningham and William P. Driscoll rescued, three Big Mothers launch from USS Okinawa, bad vectors, RESCAP good vectors, visual two smokes, fin broke-no fins, swimmer away, cut survivor loose of raft, hook hard to open, 8-10 SAMs fired at RESCAP, second pilot hooked up wrong, hoist manual over-ride only.

24 May found wreckage, RESCAP gave vector 50/1, continued, day smoke, swimmer dropped, drop coiled cable, "D" rings attached, pick-up, frayed cable seriously injured crewman's hand, directed to nearest ship for medical attention.

May–June Operation Thunderhead potential POW recovery flight path along North Vietnam coast line, within estuaries, searching for AGENTS, two weeks, lost SEAL teams from USS Grayback found and rescued no POWs. Canceled.

7 August 9 miles (14 km) inland- 45 minutes feet dry, five hours evading the enemy, give a strobe, intense barrage of ground fire, enemy fires pencil flares, helo lands, crewmen fire on advancing troops, 50 feet distant, pilot puts on horse collar, then runs to helicopter, crewman yank him in, full power vertical lift off, 21 miles to feet wet, 2 missiles streak by.

HC-7 maintained 2 helicopters for worldwide CSAR to be dispatched on a 48-hour notice

Continued development of rescue technics (Special Projects): chaff and flare dispensing systems, N2 Laser/Dye Marker search system, Emergency Low Visibility Approach System, new snap link and rescue swimmer check list, mini gun syllabus, anti-aircraft fire control warning, voice encryption, electronic location finder.

==== 1973 ====
2 rescues (0 combat, 2 other). Staffing (July) 56 officers, 242 enlisted, 25 helicopters.

14 January last CSAR mission.

February–March Det 110 provided SAR backup for Operation End Sweep the demining of Haiphong harbor and plane guard flights for host carrier.

24 September the last cross-deck USS Coral Sea, departs the war zone, steaming east to Naval Base Subic Bay. Det Cubi continued CSAR contingency readiness training.

==== 1974 ====
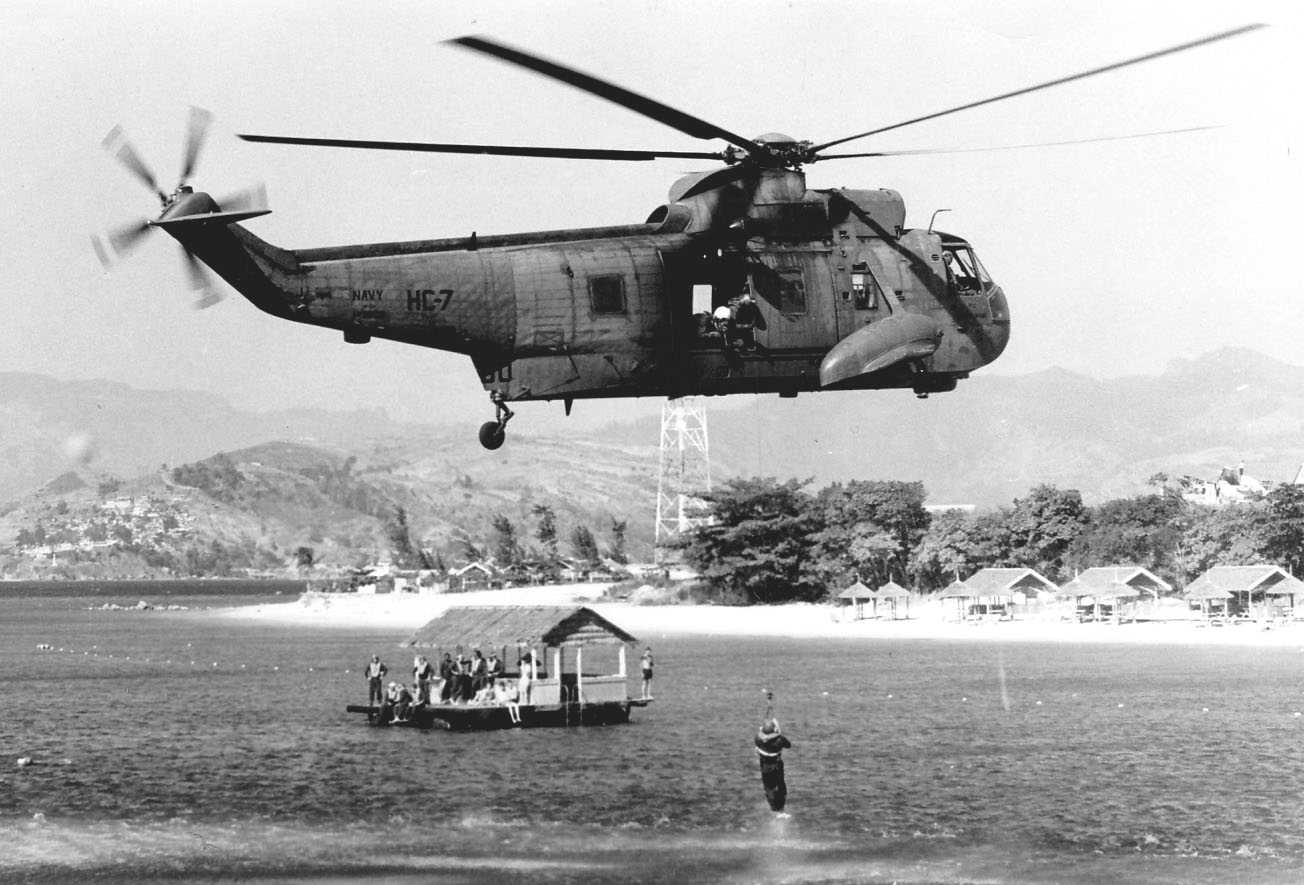
HC-7 HH-3A off NAS Cubi Point in January 1974

0 rescues. Staffing (January) 53 officers, 262 enlisted, 23 helicopters.

21 May Det Cubi sends aircraft and personnel to Naval Outlying Landing Field Imperial Beach closing HC-7's part in the Vietnam War. HC-7 continues mission readiness and training.

==== 1975 ====
1 rescue. Staffing (January) 31 officers, 167 enlisted, 8 helicopters.

8 April Last rescue NAS Fallon, Nevada, While conducting SAR training an F-8 Crusader pilot had ejected. The Big Mother crew, a joint squadron team, HC-7, HC-1 and HC-2.

May HC-7 to be disestablished.

June transfers of men and equipment completed.

HC-7 lost six helicopters, Three UH-2A/Bs (1 combat shot down, 1 self shot down, 1 fuel starvation) Two H-46s (each having engine failure) and one SH-3A (tail system failure).

== Commanding officers ==
- CDR Lloyd L. Parthemer 1 September 1967 to 24 September 1968
- CDR Ronald N. Hipp 24 September 1968 to 16 September 1969
- CDR Donald G. Gregory 16 September 1969 to 11 September 1970
- CDR Gerald L. Glade 11 September 1970 to 4 August 1971
- CDR John E. Woolam 4 August 1971 to 6 July 1972
- CDR David J. McCracken 6 July 1972 to 27 July 1973
- CDR Billy C. Lamberth 27 July 1973 to 26 July 1974
- CDR Walter B. Lester 26 July 1974 to 30 June 1975

== Insignia ==
HC-7's insignia has a central focal point Cerberus who acclaimed as one of the most feared creatures in Greek and Roman mythology. The three heads attached to a single body symbolize the three basic missions of the squadron: rescue, vertical replenishment and utility. The gold circle surrounding the insignia represents a halo, hence the downed aviators reference to the rescue helicopter an "angel". The insignia was approved in August 1968.

== Aircraft ==
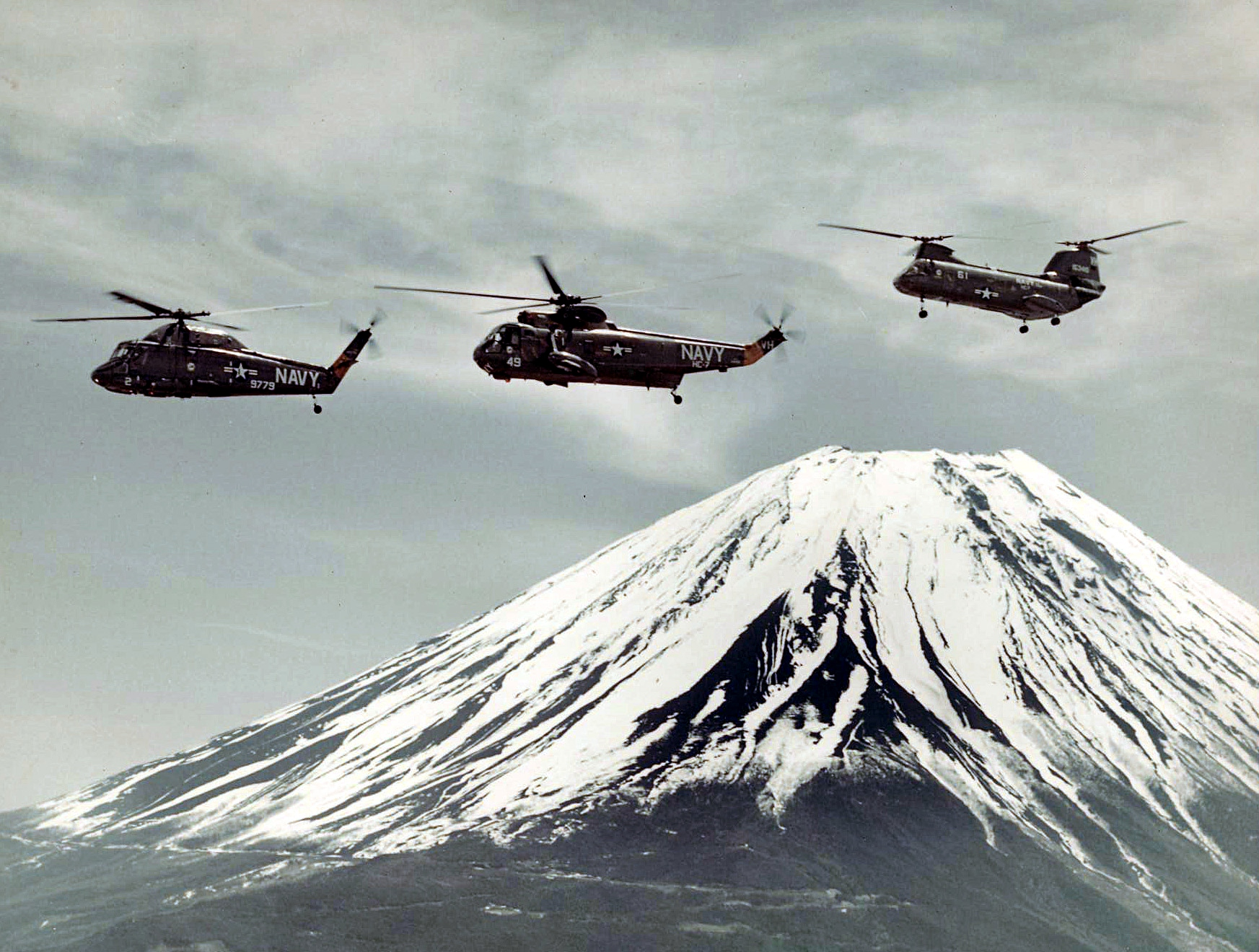
HC-7 UH-2A Seasprite, UH-46D Sea Knight and HH-3A Sea King fly past Mount Fuji c.1970

- 19 Kaman UH-2A/B (Sea Sprite)
- 5 Kaman UH-2C (Sea Sprite)
- 7 Kaman HH-2C-D (Sea Sprite)
- 33 Sikorsky SH-3A-G (Sea King)
- 12 Sikorsky HH-3A (Sea King)
- 3 Sikorsky RH-3A (Sea King)
- 12 Boeing UH-46A-D (Sea Knight)
- 1 Sikorsky UH-34 (Sea Horse)

92 aircraft in total

HC-7 helicopter armament included M16 rifles, M79 grenade launchers, M60 machine guns. In 1970 Big Mother H-3s were modified installing a GAU-2B/A minigun upon armor plated mount in right rear aft cargo door. The HH-2Cs arrived having a chin mounted minigun turret system, no guns were ever received. With essential CSAR equipment installed, to remain below the 12,500-pound max., the turret system was removed. Fuel and CSAR equipment had priority over the minigun. M60 machine guns were mounted in the cargo doors. The H-3s were tested with minigun pods mounded exterior aft, which proved to be too heavy for the existing climate of the war zone.
