= Quang Lang Air Base =

- Part of Vietnam People's Air Force

Site information
- Type: Air Force Base
- Controlled by: Vietnam People's Air Force
- Condition: abandoned

Location
- Coordinates: 18°58′27″N 105°02′51″E

Site history
- Built: 1966
- In use: 1966-1972
- Battles/wars: Vietnam War

Airfield information
- IATA: none; ICAO: none

Summary
- Elevation AMSL: 60 ft (18 m)
- Interactive map of Airfield information

Quang Lang Air Base is a former Vietnam People's Air Force (VPAF) (Không quân Nhân dân Việt Nam) military airfield located near the town of Duc Son, Nghệ An Province approximately 75 km (47 miles) northwest of Vinh.

== History ==
On 19 January 1972, while escorting an RA-5C on a photo-reconnaissance mission over the base, Lieutenant Duke Cunningham and Lieutenant j.g. William P. Driscoll of VF-96 flying an F-4B engaged and shot down a VPAF Mikoyan-Gurevich MiG-21.

The base was attacked during Operation Proud Deep Alpha in late December 1971. More than 160 craters appeared in photographs after about two hundred bombs had been dropped, however the Pierced steel planking runway was broken in only fourteen places and was quickly repaired. East German television indicated that two MiG–21s were blown on their backs at the base.

On 6 March 1972, LT Garry Weigand and LTJG Bill Freckleton of VF-111 flying an F-4B engaged and shot down a VPAF MiG-17 near the base. Also on 6 March, while escorting an RA-5C near the base, an F-4J of VF-51 engaged a MiG near the base but the kill was unconfirmed.

On 15 June 1972, during Operation Linebacker U.S. fighter-bombers again attacked the base cratering the runway. The base was attacked again on 18 June with further damage to the runway.

=== Current use ===
The base has been abandoned and turned over to farmland.
