= Mikoyan-Gurevich MiG-21 =

1956 Soviet fighter aircraft family

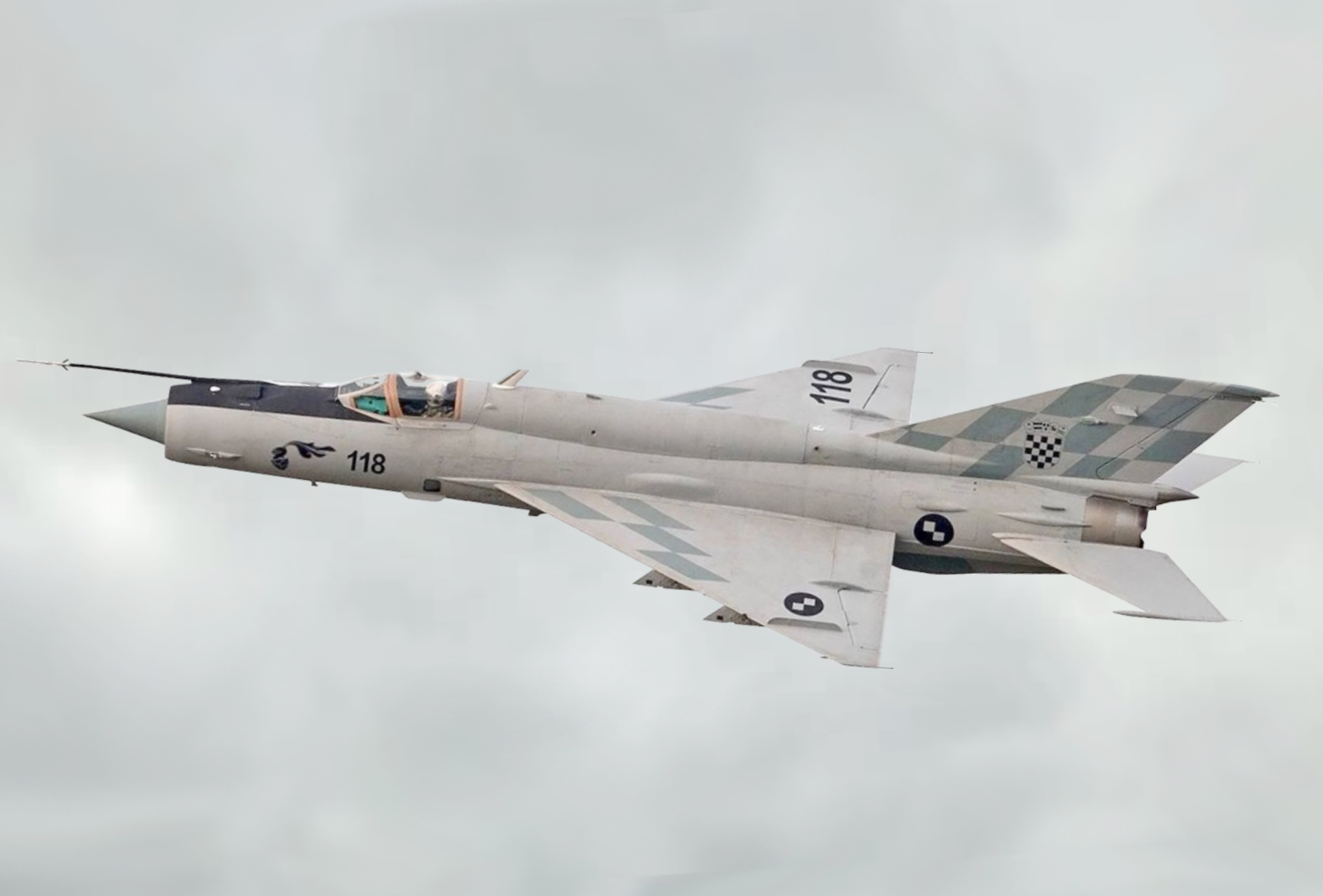
- A Croatian MiG-21bis-D in flight

General information
- Type: Fighter and interceptor aircraft
- National origin: Soviet Union
- Designer: Mikoyan-Gurevich
- Status: In service
- Primary users: Soviet Air Forces (historical) Indian Air Force (historical); North Korean Air Force; Angolan Air Force
- Number built: 11,496 (10,645 produced in the USSR, 840 in India, 194 in Czechoslovakia)

History
- Manufactured: 1959–1986
- Introduction date: 1959 (MiG-21F)
- First flight: 14 February 1955 (Ye-2)
- Variant: Chengdu J-7

The Mikoyan-Gurevich MiG-21 (Russian: Микоян и Гуревич МиГ-21; NATO reporting name: Fishbed) is a supersonic jet fighter and interceptor aircraft, designed by the Mikoyan-Gurevich Design Bureau in the Soviet Union. Its nicknames include: "Balalaika", because its planform resembles the stringed musical instrument of the same name; "Ołówek", Polish for "pencil", due to the shape of its fuselage, and "Én Bạc", meaning "silver swallow", in Vietnamese.

Approximately 60 countries across four continents have flown the MiG-21, and it still serves many nations seven decades after its maiden flight. It set aviation records, becoming the most-produced supersonic jet aircraft in aviation history, the most-produced combat aircraft since the Korean War and, previously, the longest production run of any combat aircraft.

== Development ==
=== Origins ===
The MiG-21 jet fighter was a continuation of Soviet jet fighters, starting with the transonic MiG-15 and MiG-17, and the supersonic MiG-19. A number of experimental Mach 2 Soviet designs were based on nose intakes with either swept-back wings, such as the Sukhoi Su-7, or tailed deltas, of which the MiG-21 would be the most successful.

Development of what would become the MiG-21 began in the early 1950s when Mikoyan OKB finished a preliminary design study for a prototype designated Ye-1 in 1954. This project was very quickly reworked when it was determined that the planned engine was underpowered; the redesign led to the second prototype, the Ye-2. Both these and other early prototypes featured swept wings. The first prototype with the delta wings found on production variants was the Ye-4. It made its maiden flight on 16 June 1955 and its first public appearance during the Soviet Aviation Day display at Moscow's Tushino airfield in July 1956.

In the West, due to the lack of available information, early details of the MiG-21 often were confused with those of similar Soviet fighters of the era. In one instance, Jane's All the World's Aircraft 1960–1961 listed the "Fishbed" as a Sukhoi design and used an illustration of the Su-9 'Fishpot'.

=== Design ===
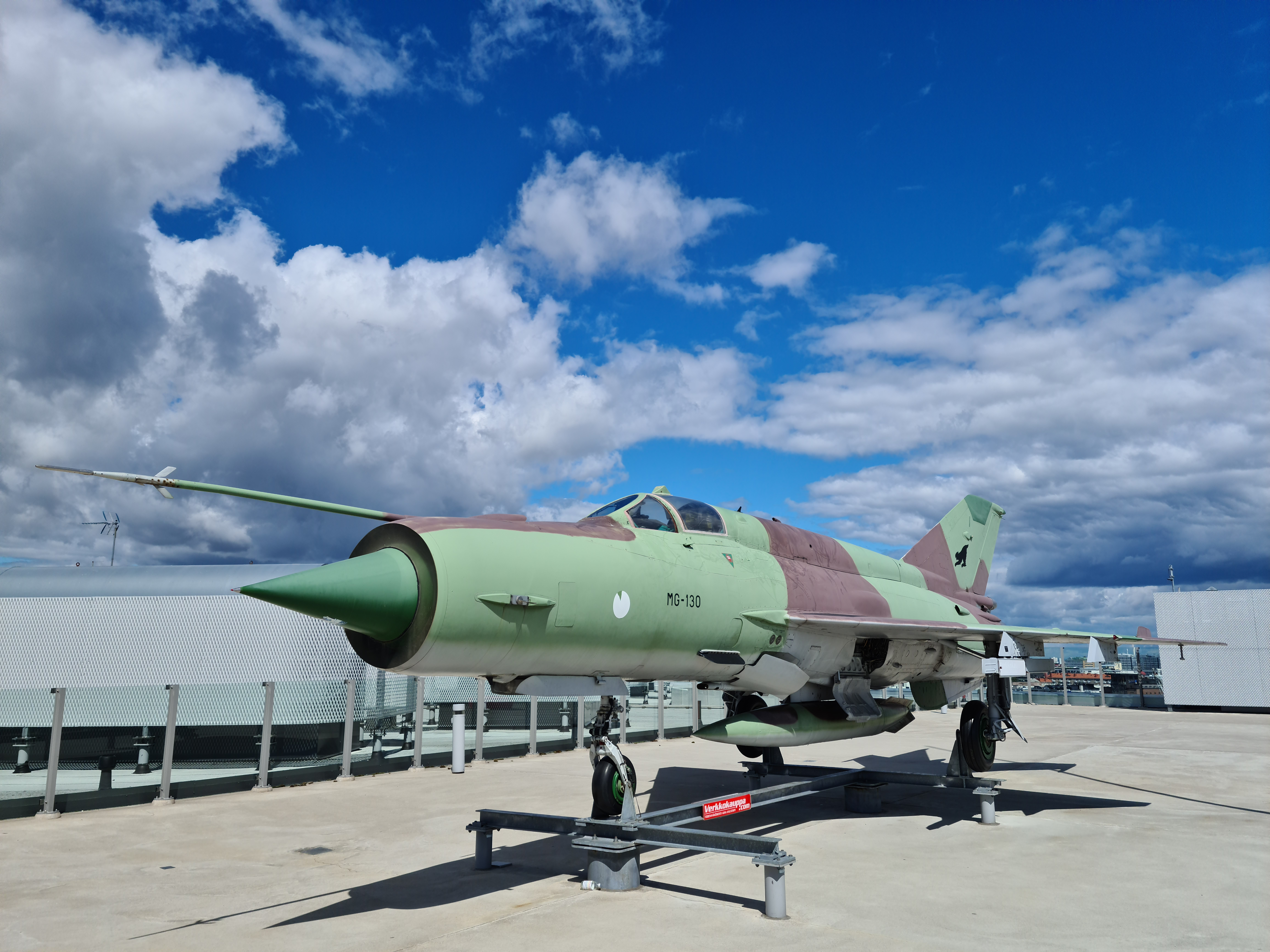
Retired Finnish MiG-21bis on top of Verkkokauppa store in Helsinki (Tyynenmerenkatu 11)

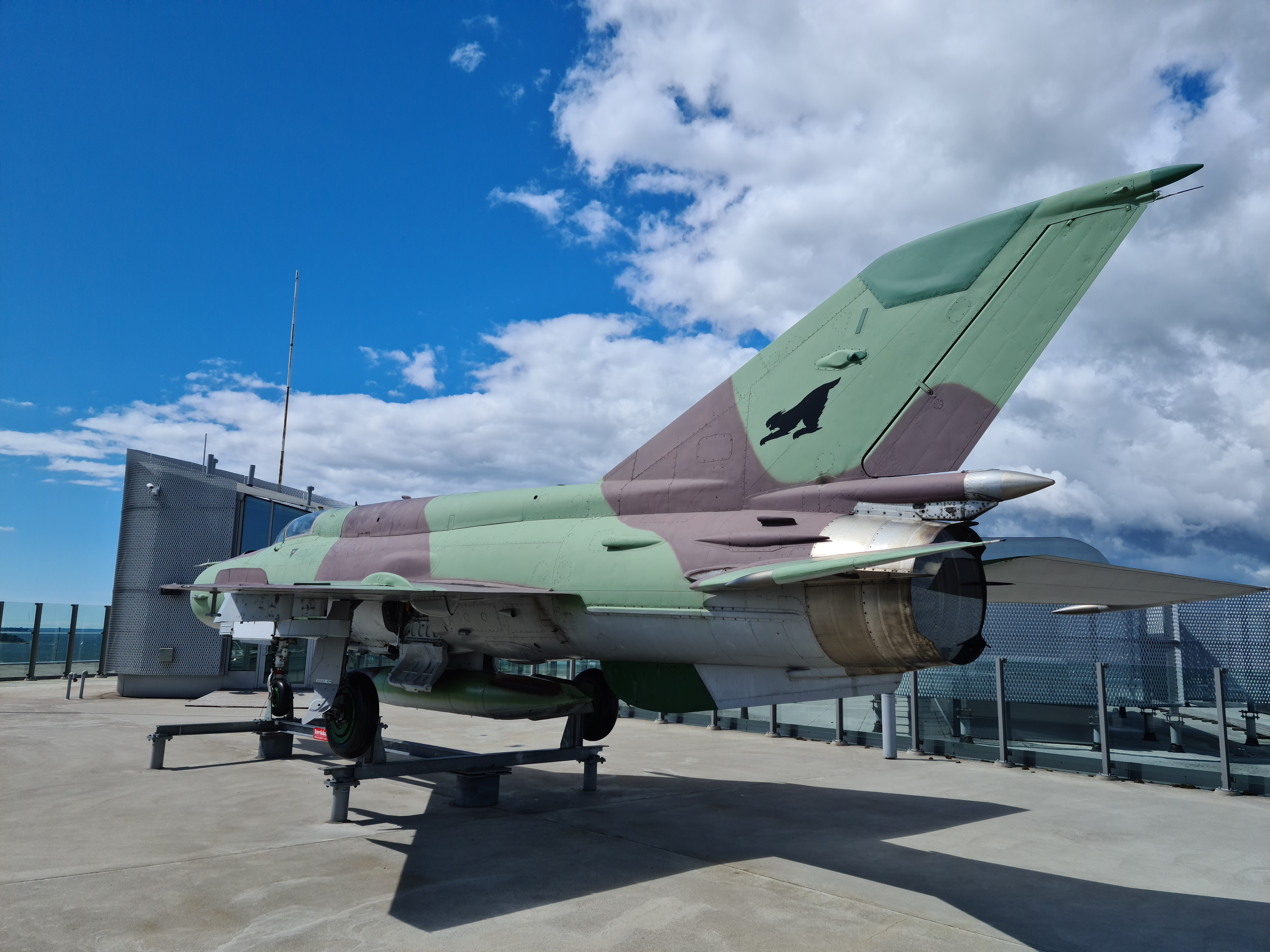
MiG-21bis rear

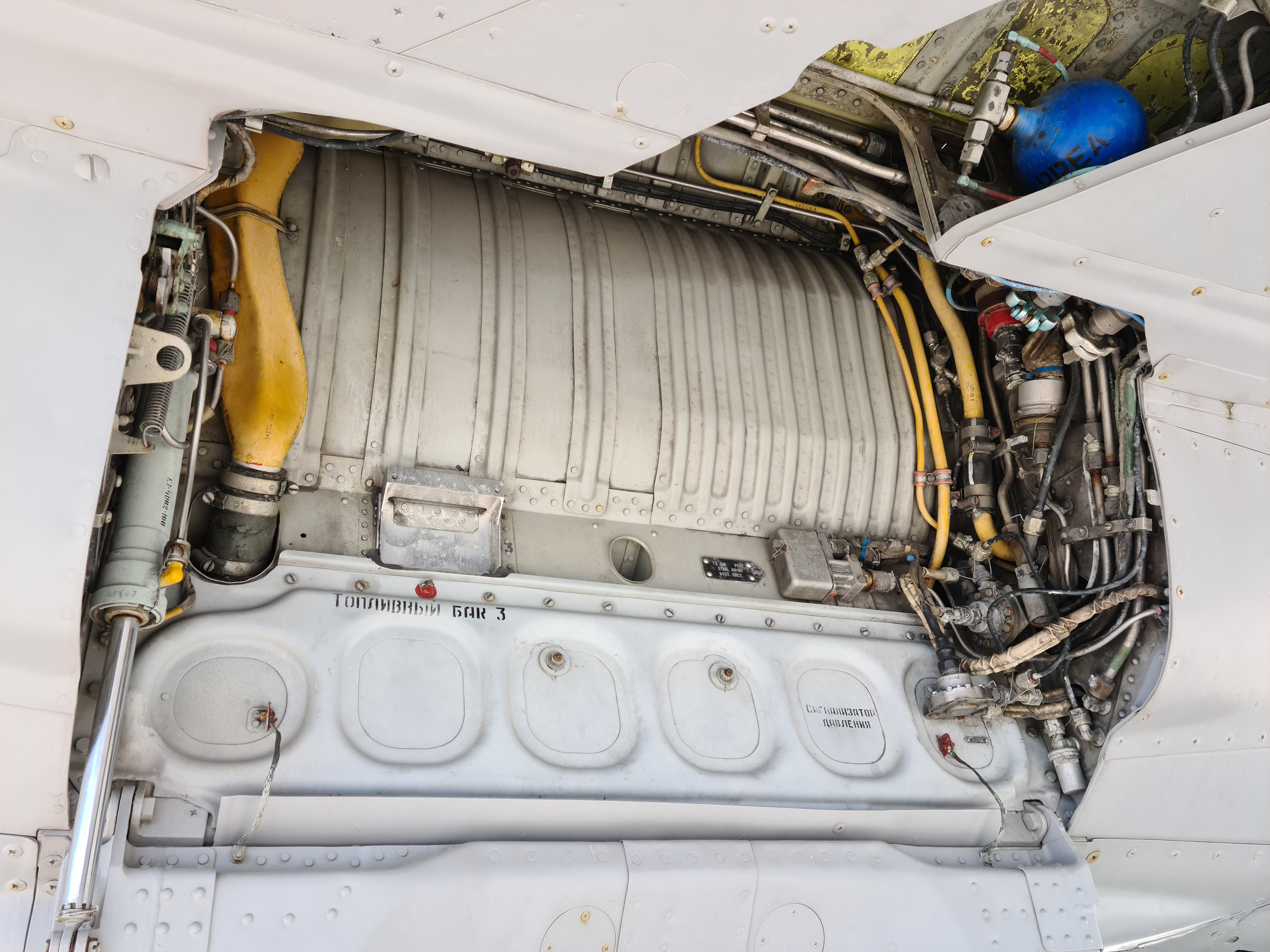
Close-up of the landing gear bay

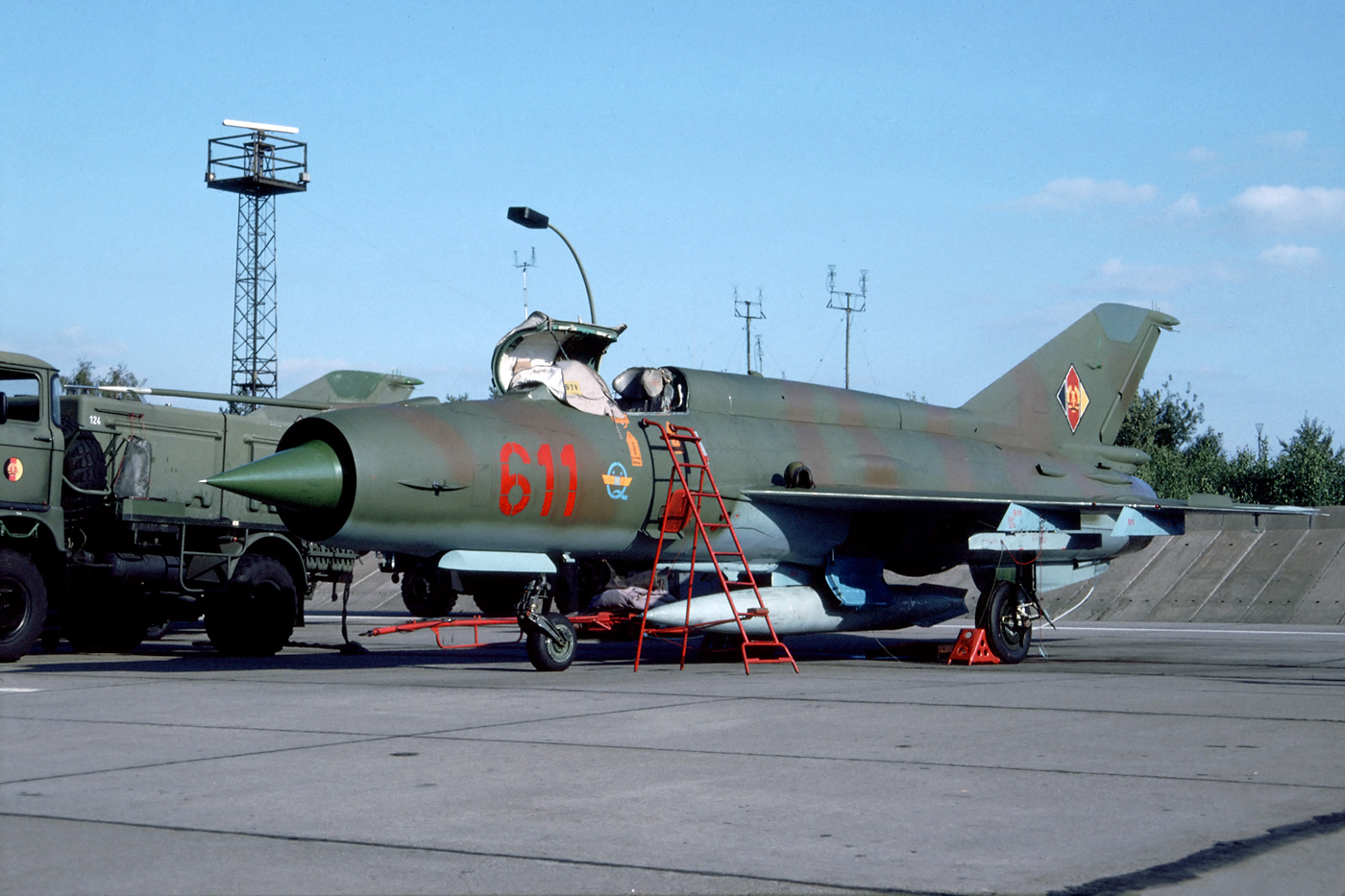
MiG-21М of the National People's Army of the GDR, August 1990

The MiG-21 was the first successful Soviet aircraft combining fighter and interceptor characteristics in a single aircraft. It was a lightweight fighter, achieving Mach 2 with a relatively low-powered afterburning turbojet, and is thus comparable to the American Lockheed F-104 Starfighter and Northrop F-5 Freedom Fighter and the French Dassault Mirage III. Its basic layout was used for numerous other Soviet designs; delta-winged aircraft included the Su-9 interceptor and fast Ye-150 prototype from the MiG bureau, while the successful mass-produced frontline fighter Su-7 and Mikoyan's I-75 experimental interceptor combined a similar fuselage shape with swept-back wings. However, the characteristic layout with the shock cone and front air intake did not see widespread use outside the USSR and ultimately proved to have limited development potential, mainly due to the small available space for the radar.

Like many aircraft designed as interceptors, the MiG-21 had a short range. This was exacerbated by the poor placement of the internal fuel tanks ahead of the centre of gravity. As the internal fuel was consumed, the center of gravity would shift rearward beyond acceptable parameters. This had the effect of making the plane statically unstable to the point of being difficult to control, resulting in an endurance of only 45 minutes in clean condition. This can be somewhat countered by carrying fuel in external tanks closer to the center of gravity. The Chinese variants somewhat improved the internal fuel tank layout (as did the second generation of Soviet variants), and also carried significantly larger external fuel tanks to counter this issue. Additionally, when more than half the fuel was used up, violent maneuvers prevented fuel from flowing into the engine, thereby causing it to shut down in flight. This increased the risk of tank implosions (MiG-21 had tanks pressurized with air from the engine's compressor), a problem inherited from the MiG-15, MiG-17 and MiG-19. The short endurance and low fuel capacity of the MiG-21F, PF, PFM, S/SM and M/MF variants—though each had a somewhat greater fuel capacity than its predecessor—led to the development of the MT and SMT variants. These had an increased range of 250 km (155 mi) compared to the MiG-21SM, but at the cost of worsening all other performance figures, such as a lower service ceiling and slower time to altitude.

The delta wing, while excellent for a fast-climbing interceptor, meant any form of turning combat led to a rapid loss of speed. However, the light loading of the aircraft could mean that a climb rate of 235 m/s (46,250 ft/min) was possible with a combat-loaded MiG-21bis, not far short of the performance of the later F-16A. MiG-21's Tumansky R-25 jet engine's specialty was the addition of a second fuel pump in the afterburning stage. Activating the ЧР (rus. "чрезвычайный режим" - emergency mode)(Emergency Power Rating, EPR in India) booster feature allows the engine to develop 97.4 kilonewtons (21,896 lbf) of thrust under 2,000 meters (6,600 ft) of altitude. The rpm of the engine would increase by 2.5% and the compression ratio would thus increase, with a rise in exhaust temperature. The limit of operation is 2 minutes for both practice and actual wartime use, as further use causes the engine to overheat. The fuel consumption increased by 50% in full afterburner. Use of this temporary power gave the MiG-21bis slightly better than 1:1 thrust-to-weight ratio and a climbing rate of 254 meters/second, equalling the F-16's nominal capabilities in a close-quarters dogfight. The use of WEP thrust was limited to 2 minutes to reduce stress on the engines' 750 (250+250+250) flight hours lifetime since every second of super-afterburner counted as several minutes of regular power run due to extreme thermal stress. With WEP on, the MiG-21bis's R-25 engine produced a huge 10–12 meter long blowtorch exhaust, with six or seven brightly glowing rhomboid shock diamonds visible inside the exhaust. The Soviets gave the emergency power setting its "diamond regime" name, which was never popularly used in India. Given a skilled pilot and capable missiles, it could give a good account of itself against contemporary fighters. Its G-limits were increased from +7Gs in initial variants to +8.5Gs in the latest variants. It was replaced by the newer variable-geometry MiG-23 and MiG-27 for ground support duties. However, not until the MiG-29 would the Soviet Union ultimately replace the MiG-21 as a maneuvering dogfighter to counter new American air superiority types.

The MiG-21 was exported widely and remains in use. The aircraft's simple controls, engine, weapons, and avionics were typical of Soviet-era military designs. The use of a tail with the delta wing aids stability and control at the extremes of the flight envelope, enhancing safety for lower-skilled pilots; this, in turn, enhanced its marketability in exports to developing countries with limited training programs and restricted pilot pools. While technologically inferior to the more advanced fighters it often faced, low production and maintenance costs made it a favorite of nations buying Eastern Bloc military hardware. Several Russian, Israeli and Romanian firms have begun to offer upgrade packages to MiG-21 operators, designed to bring the aircraft up to a modern standard, with greatly upgraded avionics and armaments.

=== Production ===
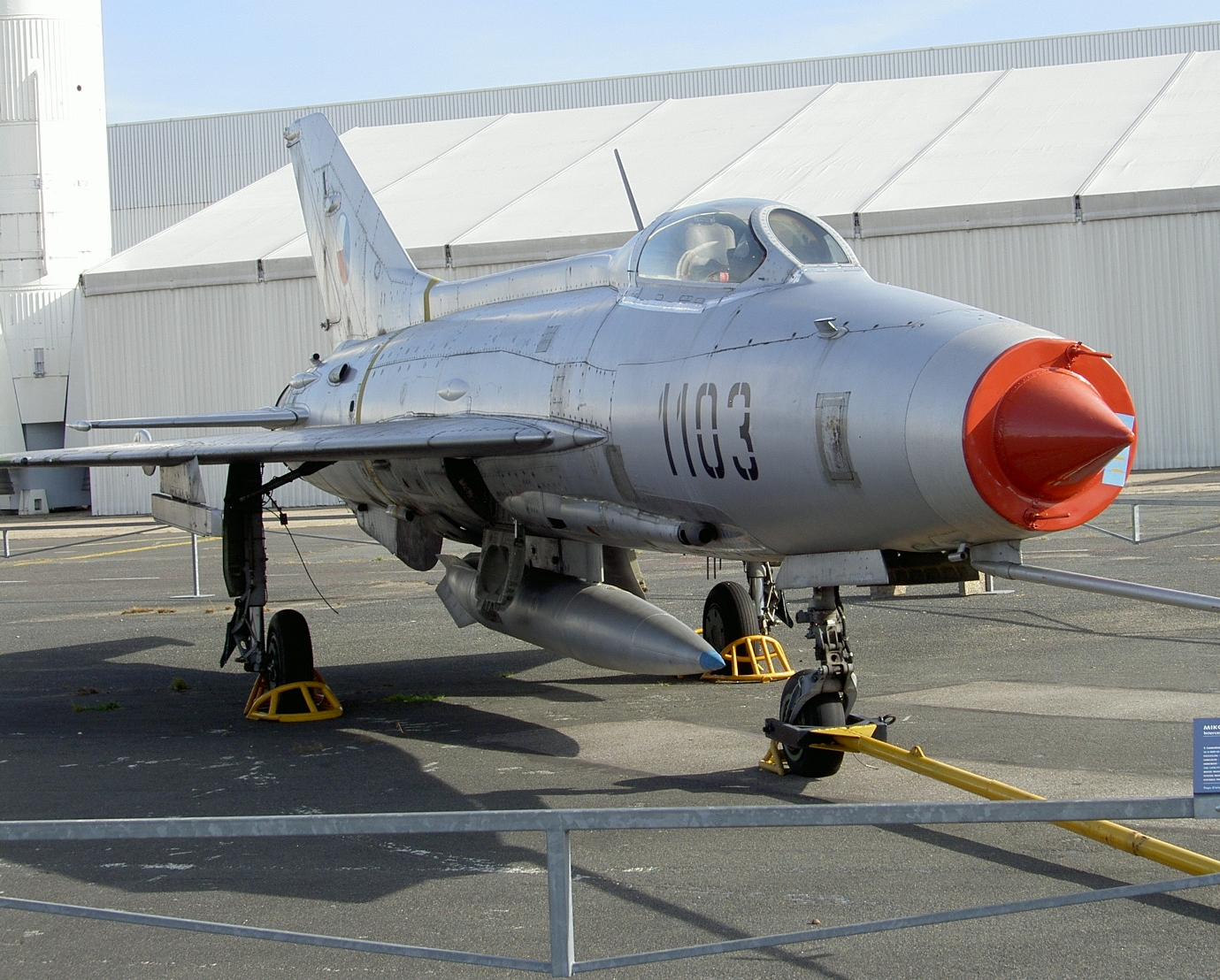
Czechoslovak MiG-21F-13 "Fishbed C"

A total of 10,645 aircraft were built in the USSR. They were produced in three factories: AZ 30 (Note: "AZ" – abbreviation for Russian "Авиационный Завод" – АЗ (Aviation Plant).) (3,203 aircraft) in Moscow (also known as MMZ Znamya Truda), GAZ 21 (5,765 aircraft) in Gorky, (Note: Now called Nizhny Novgorod.) and TAZ 31 (1,678 aircraft) in Tbilisi. Generally, Gorky built single-seaters for the Soviet forces. Moscow constructed single-seaters for export, and Tbilisi manufactured two-seaters both for export and the USSR, though there were exceptions. The MiG-21R and MiG-21bis for export and for the USSR were built in Gorky, 17 single-seaters were built in Tbilisi (MiG-21 and MiG-21F), the MiG-21MF was first constructed in Moscow and then Gorky, and the MiG-21U was built in Moscow as well as in Tbilisi.

| Gorky | 83 MiG-21F; 513 MiG-21F-13; 525 MiG-21PF; 233 MiG-21PFL; 944 MiG-21PFS/PFM; 448 MiG-21R; 145 MiG-21S/SN; 349 MiG-21SM; 281 MiG-21SMT; 2013 MiG-21bis; 231 MiG-21MF |
| Moscow | MiG-21U (all export units); MiG-21PF (all export units); MiG-21FL (all units not built by HAL); MiG-21M (all); 15 MiG-21MT (all) |
| Tbilisi | 17 MiG-21 and MiG-21F; 181 MiG-21U izdeliye 66–400 and 66–600 (1962–1966); 347 MiG-21US (1966–1970); 1133 MiG-21UM (1971 to end) |

A total of 194 MiG-21F-13s were built under licence in Czechoslovakia, and Hindustan Aeronautics Ltd. of India built 657 MiG-21FL, MiG-21M and MiG-21bis (of which 225 were bis)

=== Cost ===
Due to the mass production, the aircraft was very cheap: the MiG-21MF, for example, was cheaper than the BMP-1. The F-4 Phantom's cost was several times higher than MiG-21.

== Design ==
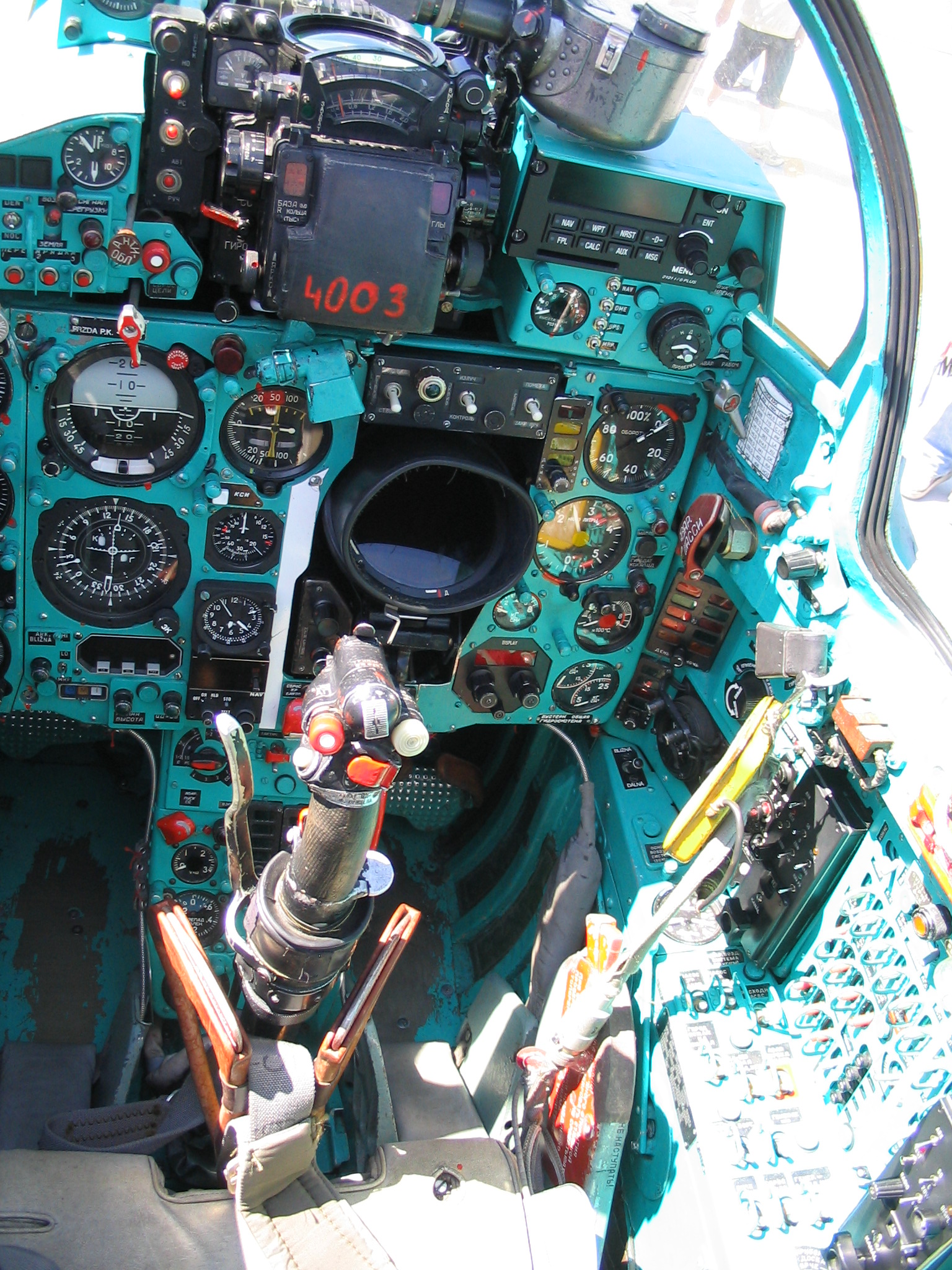
Czech Air Force MiG-21MF cockpit upgraded for NATO standards

The MiG-21 has a delta wing. The sweep angle on the leading edge is 57° with a TsAGI S-12 airfoil. The angle of incidence is 0° while the dihedral angle is −2°. On the trailing edge there are ailerons with an area of 1.18 m^{2}, and flaps with an area of 1.87 m^{2}. In front of the ailerons there are small wing fences.

The fuselage is semi-monocoque with an elliptical profile and a maximum width of 1.24 m (4 ft 1 in). The air flow to the engine is regulated by an inlet cone in the air intake. On early model MiG-21s, the cone has three positions. For speeds up to Mach 1.5, the cone is fully retracted to the maximum aft position. For speeds between Mach 1.5 and Mach 1.9, the cone moves to the middle position. For speeds higher than Mach 1.9, the cone moves to the maximum forward position. On the later model MiG-21PF, the intake cone moves to a position based on the actual speed. The cone position for a given speed is calculated by the UVD-2M system using air pressures from in front and behind the compressor of the engine. On both sides of the nose, there are gills to supply the engine with more air while on the ground and during takeoff. In the first variant of the MiG-21, the pitot tube is attached to the bottom of the nose. After the MiG-21P variant, this tube is attached to the top of the air intake. Later versions shifted the pitot tube attachment point 15 degrees to the right, as seen from the cockpit, and had an emergency pitot head on the right side, just ahead of the canopy and below the pilot's eyeline.

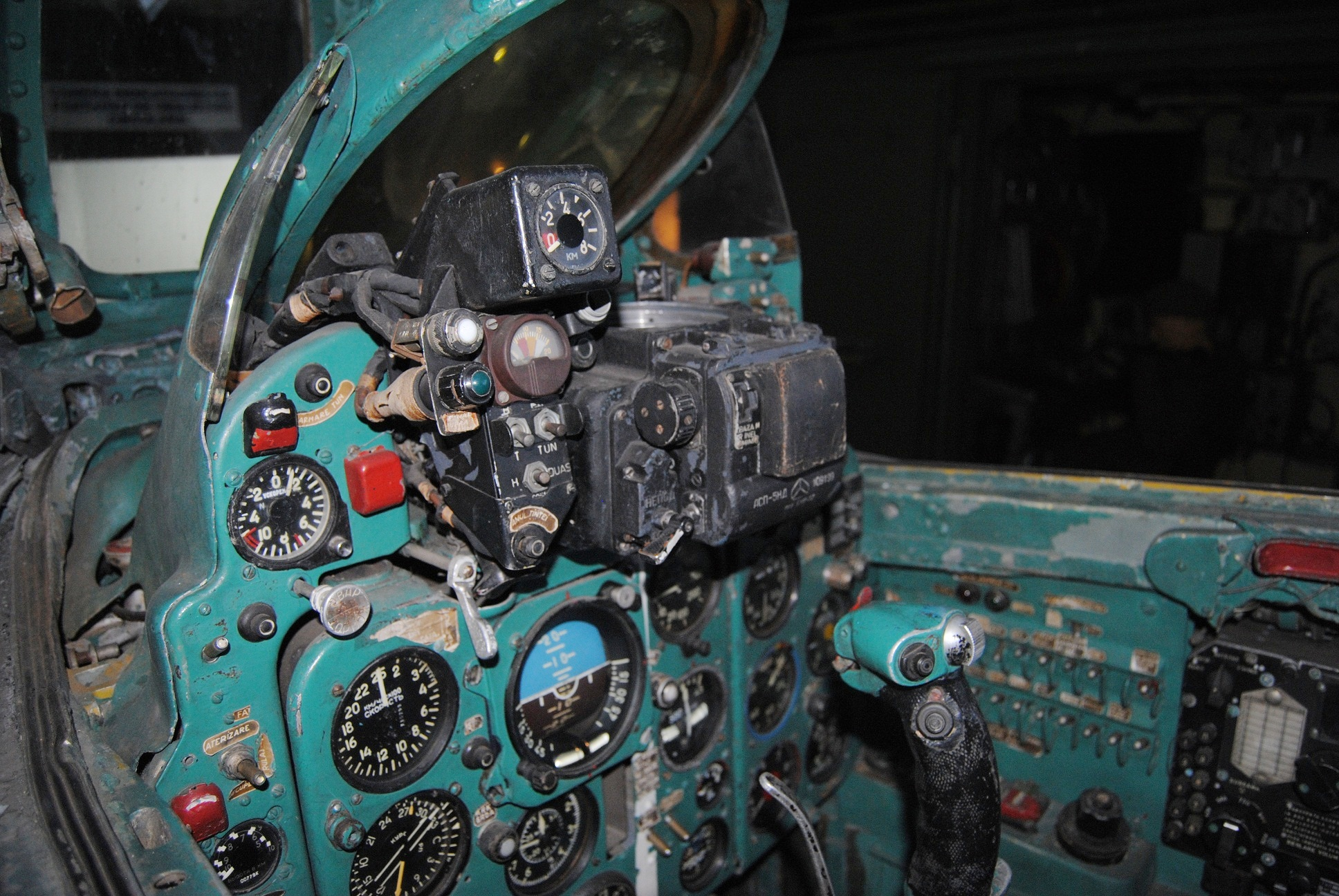
MiG-21F-13 cockpit at the Aviation Museum in Bucharest, Romania

The cabin is pressurized and air-conditioned. On variants prior to the MiG-21PFM, the cabin canopy is hinged at the front. When ejecting, the SK-1 ejection seat connects with the canopy to provide a windbreak from the high-speed airflow encountered during high-speed ejections. After ejection, the canopy opens to allow the pilot to parachute to the ground. However, ejecting at low altitudes can cause the canopy to take too long to separate, sometimes resulting in pilot death. The minimum height for ejection in level flight was 110 m. Starting with the MiG-21PFM, a new ejection seat proved to be very reliable and did not need the canopy to protect the pilot which had never been fully satisfactory. The canopy is hinged on the right side of the cockpit.

On the underside of the aircraft, there are three air brakes, two at the front and one at the rear. The front air brakes have an area of 0.76 m^{2}, and a deflection angle of 35°. The rear air brake has an area of 0.47 m^{2} and a deflection angle of 40°. The rear air brake is blocked if the airplane carries an external fuel tank. Behind the air brakes are the bays for the main landing gear. On the underside of the airplane, just behind the trailing edge of the wing are attachment points for two JATO rockets. The front section of the fuselage ends at former #28. The rear section of the fuselage starts at former #28a and is removable for engine maintenance.

The empennage of the MiG-21 consists of a vertical stabilizer, a stabilator and a small fin on the bottom of the tail to improve yaw control. The vertical stabilizer has a sweep angle of 60° and an area of 5.32 m^{2} (on earlier version 3.8 m^{2}) and a rudder. The stabilator has a sweep angle of 57°, an area of 3.94 m^{2} and a span of 2.6 m.

The MiG-21 uses a tricycle-type undercarriage. On most variants, the main landing gear uses tires that are 800 mm in diameter and 200 mm in width. Only the MiG-21F variants use tires with the size 660×200 mm. The wheels of the main landing gear retract into the fuselage after rotating 87° and the shock absorbers retract into the wing. The nose gear retracts forward into the fuselage under the radar. The nose wheel can be lowered manually by simply unlocking its hatch from inside the cockpit. Thus, landing with undercarriage locked in the up position due to an internal failure was not a major issue, with a number of such successful landings on the nosewheel and ventral fuel tank or the airbrake.

== Operational history ==
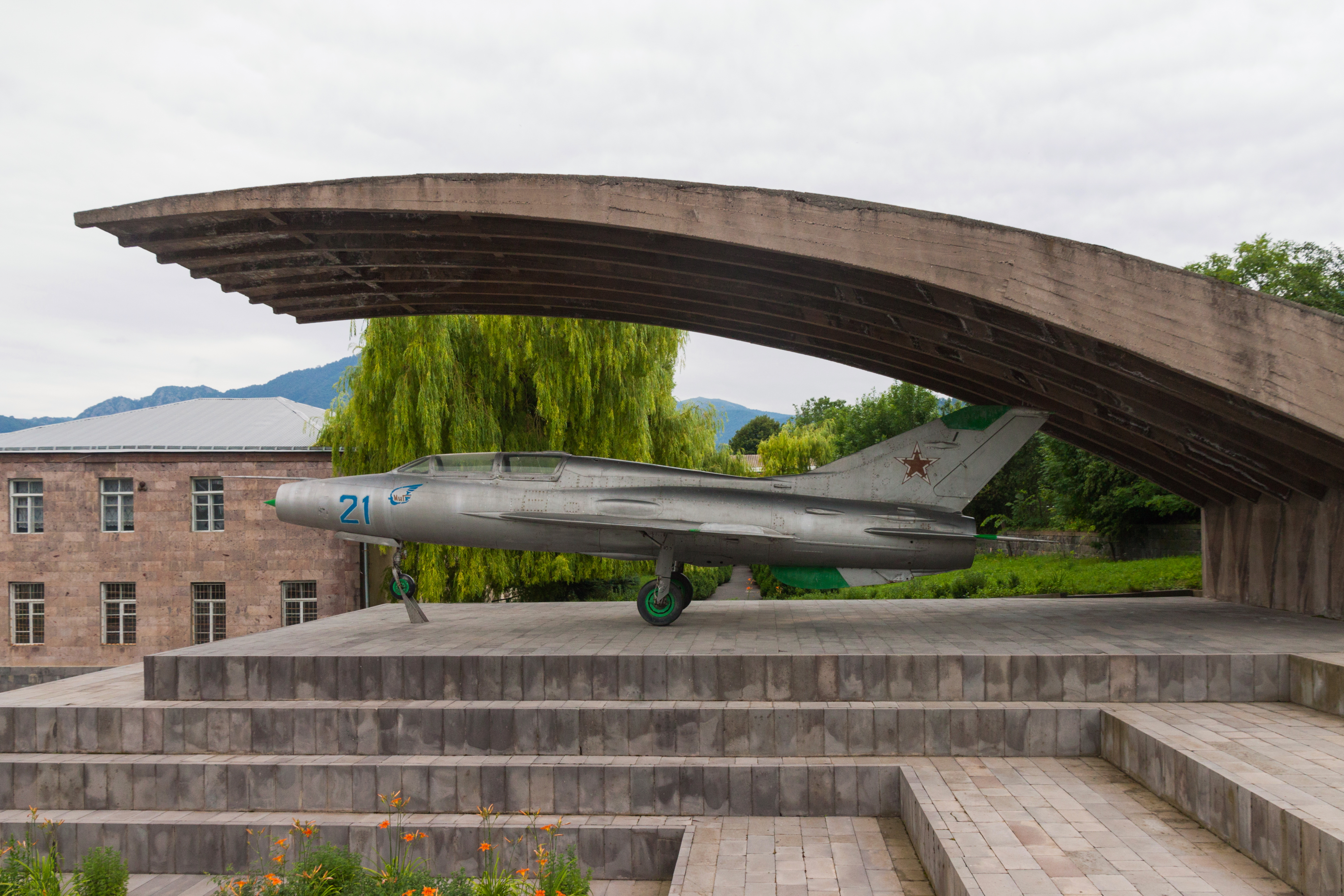
A MiG-21 at the Mikoyan museum in Alaverdi, Armenia

=== North Korea ===
North Korea acquired its first MiG-21s from the Soviet Union in 1963, and possibly earlier, making it one of the very first countries to receive the aircraft. This was the last time the USSR exported its most capable frontline fighter class to its neighbour. During low level hostilities in the inter-Korean Demilitarised Zone, Korean People's Army Air Force (KPAAF) MiG-21s were credited with shooting down an American RF-4C reconnaissance plane on August 31, 1967, an F-105D fighter five months later on January 14, 1968, and an F-4B fighter the following month on February 12. On January 23, 1968, a pair of MiG-21 fighters were involved in the first stages of the joint operation with the Korean People's Army Navy to capture the American surveillance ship USS Pueblo. The following year, two MiG-21s shoot down an EC-121 plane in international airspace, killing all 31 American servicemen on board.

During the Vietnam War North Korean personnel manned one MiG-21 company and two MiG-17 companies in the North Vietnamese fleet, providing a 50 percent increase to North Vietnam's fighter strength. Between 87 and 96 North Korean pilots served in the conflict, and were credited by North Vietnamese pilots with downing 26 American aircraft while taking 14 losses.

During the Yom Kippur War North Korean veteran pilots, many with more than 2,000 hours flight experience, flew Egyptian and Syrian MiG-21 fighters and engaged Israeli forces multiple times. KPAAF pilots continued to fly Syrian MiG-21s throughout the 1970s and into the 1980s.

North Korea made its last known MiG-21 acquisition in the 1990s, and while failing to purchase 133 airframe enhanced MiG-21bis aircraft being retired by Kazakhstan, it was able to acquire 30 of them. The MiG-21bis' integration of the more powerful R-25 engine, use of four wing hard points instead of two, and compatibility with the R-60 air-to-air missile, made these aircraft significantly superior to its previous MiG-21s. The fighters were acquired for just $200,000 each. The MiG-21bis has continued to play an important role in the North Korean fleet, with the aircraft modernised with multi function cockpit displays and new communications equipment. MiG-21BiS pilots also began sporting new helmets and flight suits around 2015, while a range of indigenous air to ground munitions including bombs and anti tank guided missiles have been produced in the country such as the AGP-250 GNSS guided glide bomb. Integration of indigenous electronic warfare systems has also been speculated.

=== Azerbaijan ===
After the fall of the Soviet Union, no MiG-21s were inherited by the Azeri Airforce, however about a dozen were acquired, likely from Ukraine and used during the First Nagorno-Karabakh War. At least one was lost to ground fire over the enclave. Some of the jets were based out of Kyurdamir.

=== India ===
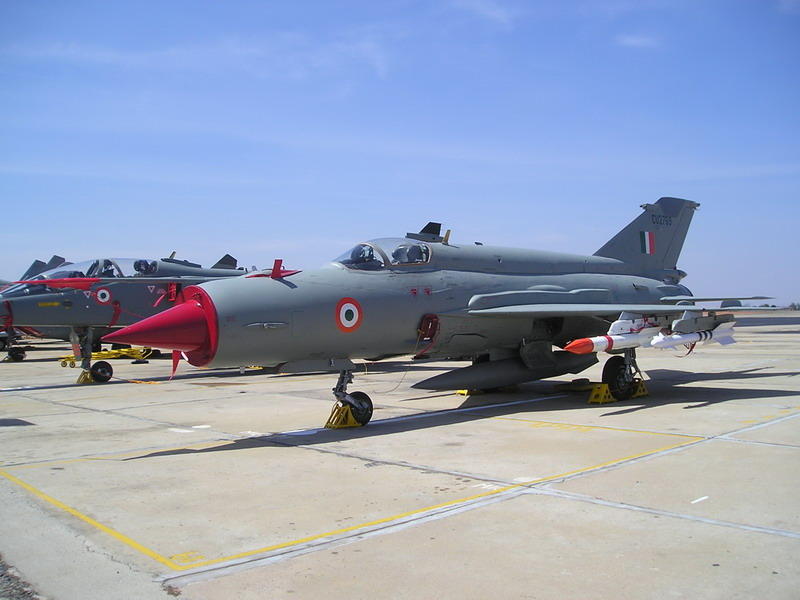
MiG-21 Bison of the Indian Air Force

In 1961, the Indian Air Force (IAF) opted to purchase the MiG-21 over several other Western competitors. As part of the deal, the Soviet Union offered India full transfer of technology and rights for local assembly. A first batch of eight pilots trained on MiG-15s and MiG-17s at the Lugovaya Air base to familiarise themselves with the Russian aircraft models and procedures from late October 1962 to early January 1963, before transitioning to the MiG-21s, which later formed the No. 28 Squadron of the IAF. In 1963, the MiG-21 became the first supersonic fighter aircraft to enter service with the IAF.

Due to limited numbers and lack of training, the IAF MiG-21s played a limited role during the Indo-Pakistani War of 1965. However, the IAF gained valuable experience while operating the MiG-21 for defensive sorties during the war. The positive feedback from the IAF pilots prompted India to place more orders for the fighter jet and invest in building the MiG-21's maintenance infrastructure and pilot training programs. Since 1963, India inducted more than 1,200 MiG-21s into its air force. At its peak, the IAF operated 400 MiG-21s across 19 squadrons. The expansion of the MiG-21 fleet helped India develop a military partnership with Soviet Union, to counter Chinese and Pakistani threats.

==== India-Pakistan Wars ====
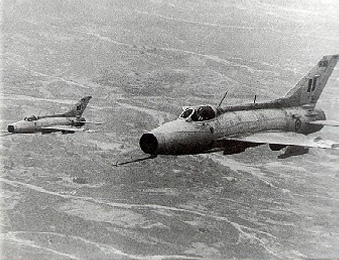
IAF MiG-21s over East Pakistan in 1971

The only known combat engagement of the MiG-21s during the Indo-Pakistani war of 1965 took place on the 4 September 1965 when a MiG-21FL of No. 28 Squadron damaged a F-86E with two R-3S missiles. During the Indo-Pakistani war of 1971, the MiG-21s played a major role for the IAF in to establish air superiority over vital points and areas of conflict. The war witnessed the first supersonic dog fight in the India subcontinent when an Indian MiG-21FL shot a Pakistan Air Force (PAF) Lockheed F-104 Starfighter with its GSh-23 twin-barrelled 23 mm (0.91 in) cannon. The IAF MiG-21FLs had an upper hand in the highly anticipated air combat with the PAF F-104A Starfighters. As per the IAF, the MiG-21s had claimed four F-104As, two Shenyang F-6Cs, one North American F-86F Sabre and one Lockheed C-130E Hercules aircraft of the PAF.

During the Kargil war in 1999, the IAF MiG-21s were pressed into combat air patrols and reconnaissance duties at high altitudes in Kashmir. As a part of Operation Safed Sagar, the aircraft flew multiple sorties against Pakistani positions and provided air support to Indian Army units. However, operating at high altitudes proved extremely challenging for the aircraft, limiting its effectiveness as a fighter aircraft. On 27 May 1999, a MiG-21 was shot down by Pakistani Ground Fire in Kargil, and the pilot was captured and later killed by Pakistani forces.

==== Later years ====
On 10 August 1999, two MiG-21FLs of the IAF intercepted and shot down a Pakistani Bréguet 1150 Atlantic maritime patrol aircraft with an R-60 missile after it allegedly entered Indian airspace for surveillance, killing all 16 on board. In December 2013, the MiG-21FL variants were decommissioned by the IAF. The aircraft was further involved during the 2019 India–Pakistan border skirmishes, with a PAF F-16 shooting down an IAF MiG-21, whose pilot was captured and later returned to India.

Since 1970, more than 170 IAF pilots and 40 civilians were killed in MiG-21 accidents, thus the earning the aircraft the nickname of "flying coffin". Over half of the 840 aircraft built between 1966 and 1984 were lost to crashes. When in afterburner, the engine operates very close to its surge line and the ingestion of a small object led to an engine surge/seizure and flame out. Poor maintenance and quality of replacement parts was considered to be a factor in the crashes. As a result, the IAF announced that it would replace its remaining fleet of MiG-21 Bison aircraft with the indigenous HAL Tejas fighter aircraft in 2023. In October 2023, the aircraft made the final public appearance at the Air Force Day flypast held at Prayagraj. The aircraft were put on standby during the 2025 India–Pakistan conflict, however were not utilised. The aircraft were retired in August 2025 in a ceremony at the Nal Air Force Station in Bikaner, which was the last airbase operating the aircraft. An official farewell ceremony was held at Chandigarh Air Force Station on 26 September 2025.

=== Bangladesh ===
Bangladesh attained it's independence in December 1971 following its war of liberation. The newly formed Bangladesh Air Force acquired MiG-21s soon afterward in 1973 with 12 MiG-21MFs (Project 96F) delivered (though, a total of sixteen different serial numbers are recorded, indicating either that the aircraft were renumbered or that more deliveries took place). They also acquired six MiG-21Ms (Type 88s) built by India with two MiG-21UM trainers were also delivered in 1973. Of the delivered Fishbeds, at least one MiG-21MF crashed in 1982 (Serial No. 7207). MiG-21Ms of the BAF were serialed 7005 to 7009 and 7012, MiG-21MFs were serialed (that are documented) 7201 to 7210 and the MiG-21UMS were serialed 036 and 046). All MiG-21s were initially assigned to No. 5 Squadron and based out of Bashar Airfield near Dhaka. These aircraft were retired in the late 1990s, replaced by J-7 variants and MiG-29s.

=== Indonesia ===
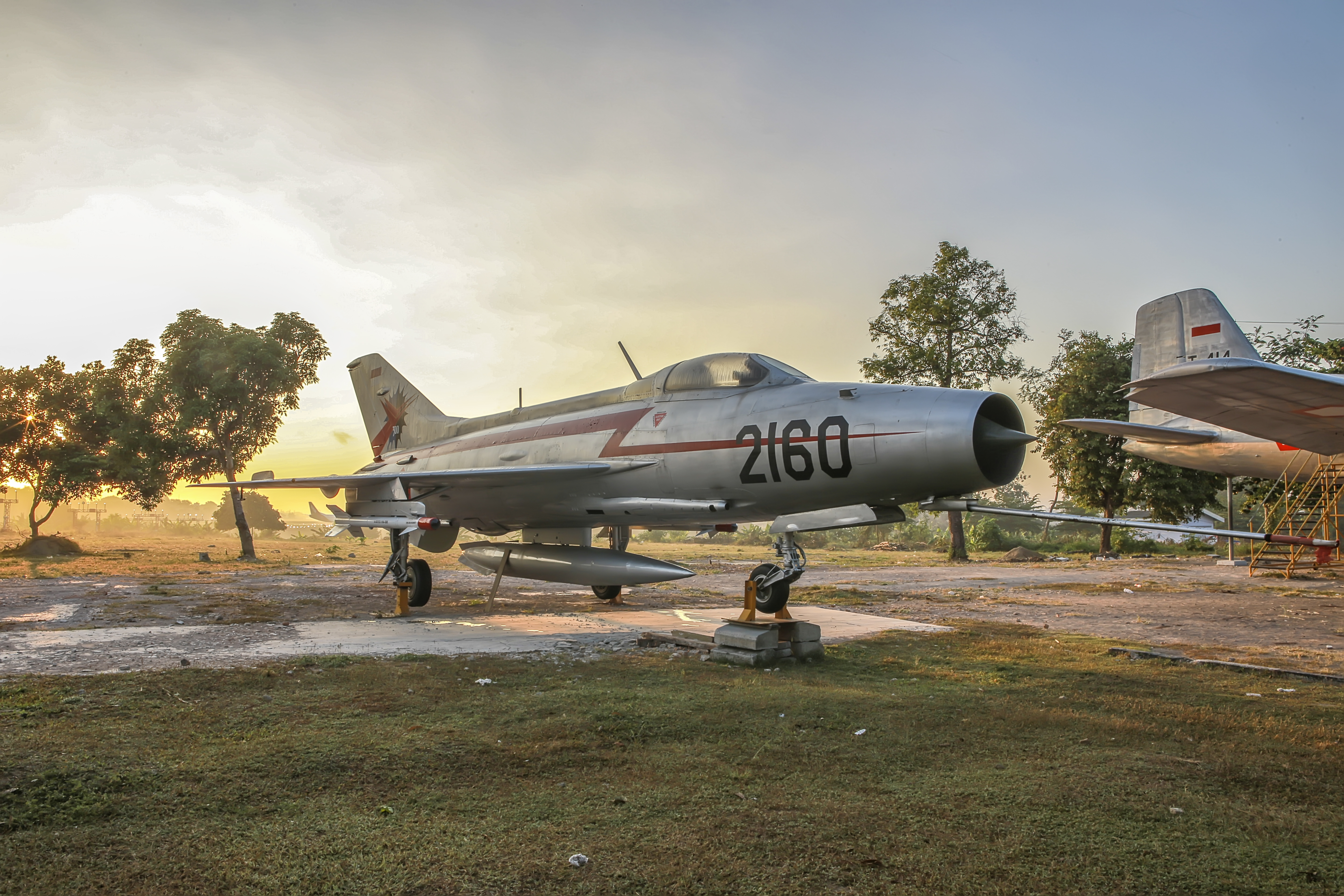
Indonesian Air Force MiG-21 in the Yogyakarta Air Force Museum

The Indonesian Air Force purchased 22 MiG-21s. In 1962, 20 MiG-21F-13s and MiG-21Us were received during Operation Trikora in the Western New Guinea conflict. Indonesian MiG-21s never fought in any dogfights. Right after the U.S.-backed anti-communist forces took over the government, 13 Indonesian MiG-21s were delivered to the U.S. in exchange for T-33, UH-34D, and later, F-5 and OV-10 aircraft. All remaining MiG-21s were grounded and retired due to a lack of spare parts and the withdrawal of Soviet maintenance support.

The MiGs were added to the 4477th Test and Evaluation Squadron ("Red Eagles"), a USAF aggressor squadron at Tonopah Test Range.

=== Vietnam War ===
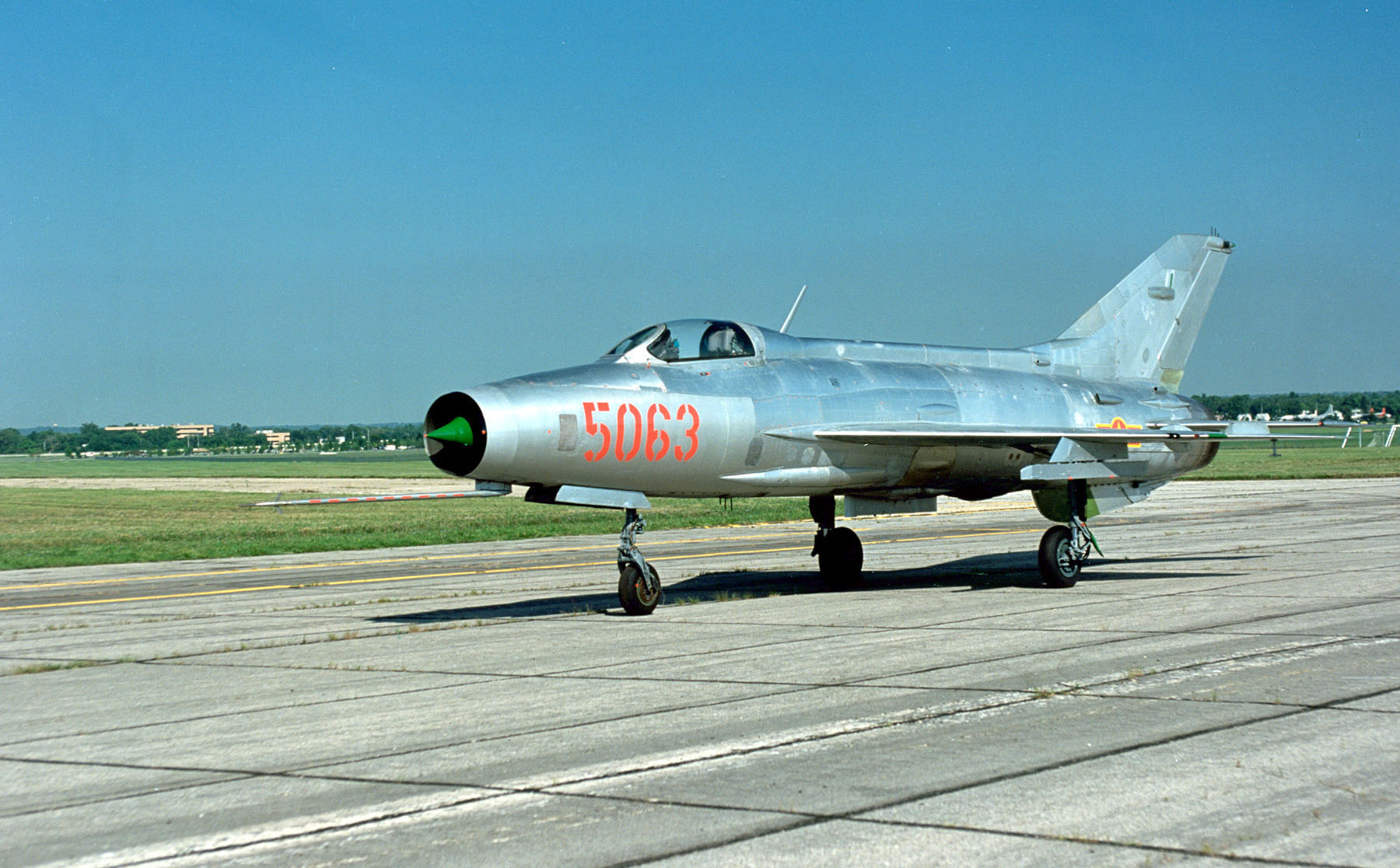
MiG-21F-13 in Vietnam People's Air Force markings exhibited at the National Museum of the United States Air Force in Ohio

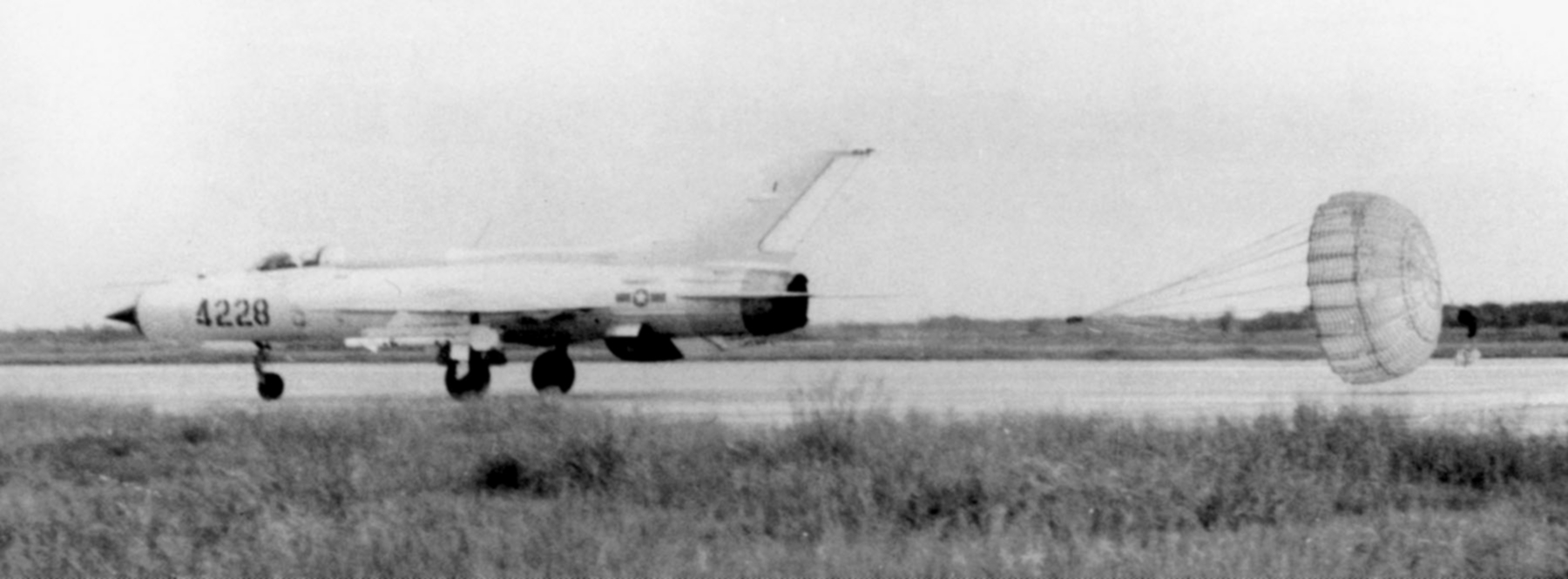
A missile-armed VPAF MiG-21PF landing using the parachute

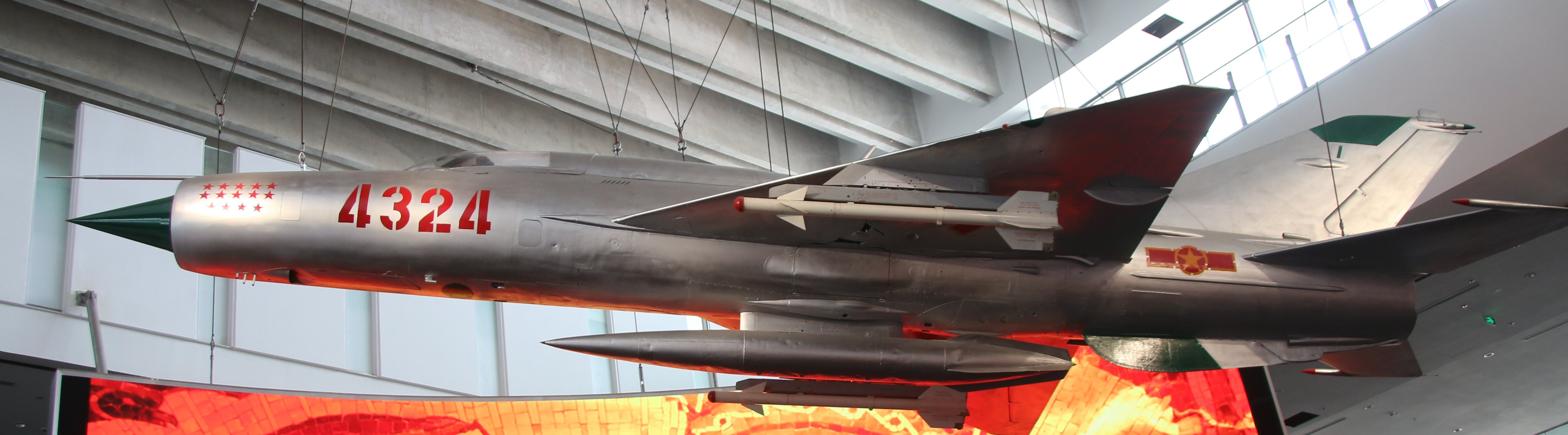
Vietnam People's Air Force MiG-21 number 4324, flown by various pilots, was credited with 14 kills during the Vietnam War

The MiG-21 was designed for very short ground-controlled interception (GCI) missions. It became renowned for this type of mission in the skies over North Vietnam. The first MiG-21s arrived directly from the Soviet Union by ship in April 1966. After being unloaded and assembled they were given to the Vietnam People's Air Force's (VPAF) oldest fighter unit, the 921st Fighter Regiment (921st FR), which had been created on 3 February 1964 as a MiG-17 unit. Because the VPAF's 923rd FR was newer and less experienced, they continued to operate MiG-17s, while the arrival of the MiG-19s (J-6 versions) from China in 1969 led to North Vietnam's only MiG-19 unit, the 925th FR. On 3 February 1972, North Vietnam commissioned its fourth and last fighter regiment created during the war with South Vietnam, the MiG-21PFM (Type 94)-equipped 927th FR.

Former MiG-17 pilot Nguyen Nhat Chieu and his wingman Tran Ngoc Siu intercepted USAF F-105Ds while on CAP duty over Phuc Yen Airbase (a.k.a. Noi Bai Airbase) on 7 July 1966, shooting down one piloted by Capt. Tomes with a salvo from Tran's UB-16-57/S-5M unguided rocket-equipped MiG-21; this was the first instance of a VPAF MiG-21 shooting down a piloted enemy aircraft in the Vietnam War. (Flight leader Nguyen was unable to establish a lock on another, wildly-evading F-105 with his R-3S AAM.)

Although 13 of North Vietnam's flying aces attained their status while flying the MiG-21 (cf. three in the MiG-17), many VPAF pilots preferred the MiG-17 because the high wing loading of the MiG-21 made it relatively less maneuverable and the lighter framed canopy of the MiG-17 gave better visibility. However, this is not the impression British author Roger Boniface got when he interviewed Pham Ngoc Lan and ace Nguyễn Nhật Chiêu (who scored victories flying both the MiG-17 and MiG-21). Pham Ngoc Lan told Boniface that "The MiG-21 was much faster, and it had two Atoll missiles which were very accurate and reliable when fired between 1,000 and 1,200 yards." And Chiêu asserted that "... for me personally, I preferred the MiG-21 because it was superior in all specifications in climb, speed and armament. The Atoll missile was very accurate and I scored four kills with the Atoll. ... In general combat conditions, I was always confident of a kill over an F-4 Phantom when flying a MiG-21."

Although the MiG-21 lacked the long-range radar, missiles, and heavy bomb load of its contemporary multi-mission U.S. fighters, its RP-21 Sapfir radar helped make it a challenging adversary in the hands of experienced pilots, especially when used in high-speed hit-and-run attacks under GCI control. MiG-21 intercepts of Republic F-105 Thunderchief strike groups were effective in downing U.S. aircraft or forcing them to jettison their bomb loads.

==== Aerial combat victories 1966–1972 ====
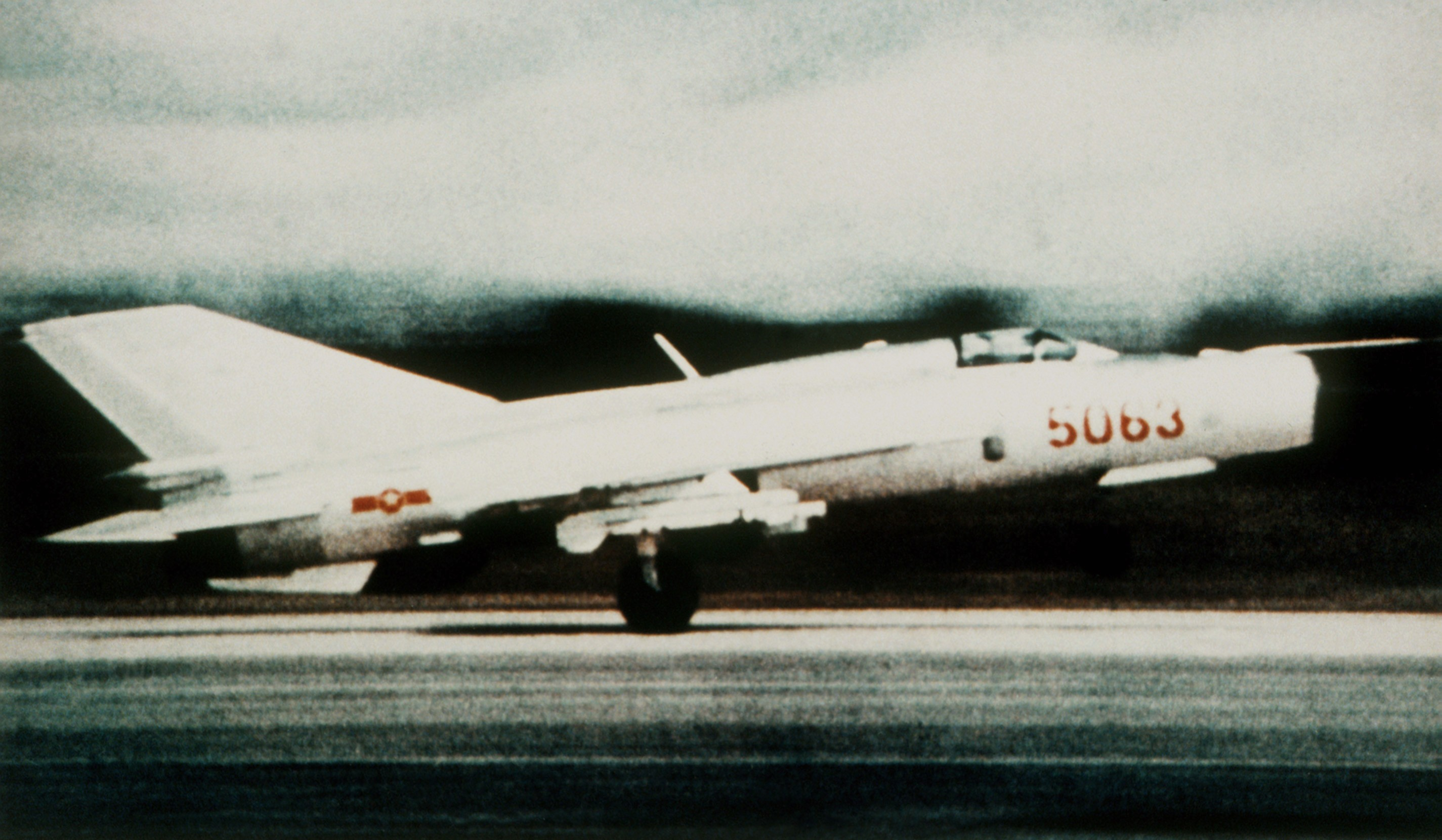
A Vietnamese MiG-21PFM

The VPAF flew their interceptors with guidance from ground controllers, who positioned the MiGs in ambush battle stations to make "one pass, then haul ass" attacks. The MiGs made fast and often accurate attacks against US formations from several directions (usually the MiG-17s performed head-on attacks and the MiG-21s attacked from the rear). After shooting down a few American planes and forcing some of the F-105s to drop their bombs prematurely, the MiGs did not wait for retaliation but disengaged rapidly. These "guerrilla warfare in the air" tactics generally proved successful during the war. In December 1966, the MiG-21 pilots of the 921st FR downed 14 F-105 Thunderchiefs without any losses.

The USAF and the US Navy had high expectations of the F-4 Phantom, assuming that their massive firepower, best available on-board radar, highest speed and acceleration properties, coupled with new tactics, would provide an advantage over the MiGs. But in confrontations with the lighter MiG-21, F-4s began to suffer losses. From May to December 1966, the USAF lost 47 aircraft, destroying only 12 VPAF fighters in return. From April 1965 to November 1968, over 268 air battles occurred over the skies of North Vietnam. North Vietnam claimed 244 downed U.S. aircraft while admitting to the loss of 85 MiGs. Of 46 air battles between F-4s and MiG-21s, losses amounted to 27 F-4 Phantoms and 20 MiG-21s.

After a million sorties and nearly 1,000 US aircraft losses, Operation Rolling Thunder came to an end on 1 November 1968. A poor air-to-air combat loss-exchange ratio against the smaller, more agile enemy MiGs during the early part of the war eventually led the US Navy to create their Navy Fighter Weapons School, also known as "TOPGUN", at Naval Air Station Miramar, California, on 3 March 1969. The USAF quickly followed with its own version, called the Dissimilar Air Combat Training (sometimes referred to as Red Flag) program at Nellis Air Force Base, Nevada. These two programs employed the subsonic Douglas A-4 Skyhawk and supersonic F-5 Tiger II, as well as the Mach 2.4-capable USAF Convair F-106 Delta Dart, to mimic the MiG-21.

The culmination of the air struggle over Vietnam in early 1972 was 10 May, when VPAF aircraft completed 64 sorties, resulting in 15 air battles. The VPAF claimed 7 F-4s were shot down (the U.S. confirmed five F-4s were lost.) The F-4s, in turn, managed to destroy two MiG-21s, three MiG-17s and one MiG-19. On 11 May, two MiG-21s, playing the "bait", brought four F-4s to 2 MiG-21s circling at low altitude. The MiGs quickly stormed the Phantoms and 3 missiles shot down two F-4s. On 13 May, a MiG-21 unit intercepted a group of F-4s and a second pair of MiGs made a missile attack before being hit by two F-4s. On 18 May, VPAF aircraft made 26 sorties, eight of which resulted in combat, downing four F-4s without any VPAF losses.

Over the course of the air war, between 3 April 1965 and 8 January 1973, each side would ultimately claim favorable kill ratios. In 1972, the number of air battles between American and Vietnamese planes stood at 201. The VPAF lost 54 MiGs (including 36 MiG-21s and one MiG-21US) and claimed 90 U.S. aircraft shot down, including 74 F-4 fighters and two RF-4C reconnaissance jets (MiG-21s shot down 67 enemy aircraft while MiG-17s shot down 11 and MiG-19s downed another 12).

One MiG-21 was shot down on 21 February 1972 by a USAF F-4 Phantom based at Udorn RTAFB, Thailand and piloted by Major Lodge with 1st Lt Roger Locher as his weapon systems officer (WSO). This was claimed as the first-ever USAF MiG kill at night, and the first in four years at that time.

Two MiG-21s were claimed shot down by USAF Boeing B-52 Stratofortress tail gunners. The first aerial victory was scored on 18 December 1972 by tail gunner Staff Sgt Samuel Turner, who was awarded the Silver Star. The second took place on 24 December 1972, when A1C Albert E. Moore downed a MiG-21 over the Thai Nguyen railroad yards. Both actions occurred during Operation Linebacker II, also known as the Christmas Bombings. These air-to-air kills were not confirmed by VPAF.

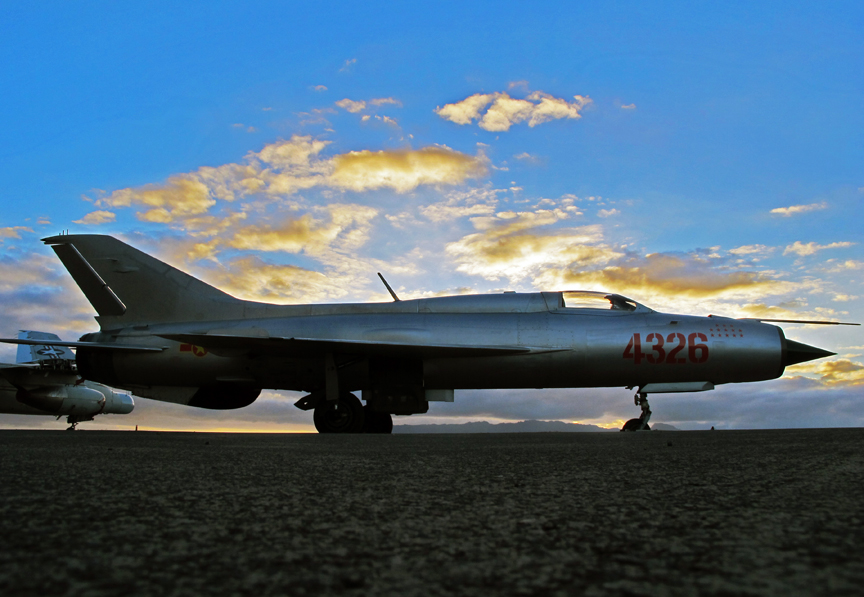
VPAF MiG-21 No.4326, which shot down 13 aircraft during the war

The biggest threat to North Vietnam during the war had always been the Strategic Air Command's B-52 bombers. Hanoi's MiG-17 and MiG-19 interceptors could not deal with the B-52s at their flying altitude. In the summer of 1972, the VPAF was directed to train 12 MiG-21 pilots for the specific mission of shooting the B-52 bombers, with two-thirds of the pilots specifically trained in night attacks. On 26 December 1972, just two days after tail gunner Albert Moore downed a MiG-21, a VPAF MiG-21MF (number 5121) from the 921st Fighter Regiment, flown by Major Phạm Tuân over Hanoi, claimed the first aerial combat kill of a B-52. The B-52 had been above Hanoi at over 30,000 feet (9,100 m) when Major Tuân launched two Atoll missiles from 2 kilometres away and claimed to have destroyed one of the bombers flying in the three-plane formation. Other sources argue that the Atoll missiles failed to hit their mark, but as it was disengaging, a B-52 from a three-bomber cell in front of his target took a hit from a surface-to-air missile (SAM), exploding in mid-air: this may have caused Tuân to think his missiles destroyed the target he had been aiming for.

The Vietnamese claimed another kill on 28 December 1972 by a MiG-21 from the 921st FR, this time flown by Vu Xuan Thieu. Thieu is said to have perished in the explosion of a B-52 hit by his own missiles, having approached the target too closely. In this case, the Vietnamese version appears to be erroneous: while one MiG-21 kill was claimed by Phantoms that night (this may have been Thieu's MiG), no B-52s were lost for any reason on the date of the claimed kill.

Year-by-year kill claims involving MiG-21s

- 1966: U.S. claimed six MiG-21s destroyed; North Vietnam claimed seven F-4 Phantom IIs and 11 F-105 Thunderchiefs shot down by MiG-21s.
- 1967: U.S. claimed 21 MiG-21s destroyed; North Vietnam claimed 17 F-105 Thunderchiefs, 11 F-4 Phantom IIs, two RF-101 Voodoos, one A-4 Skyhawk, one Vought F-8 Crusader, one EB-66 Destroyer and three unidentified types shot down by MiG-21s.
- 1968: U.S. claimed nine MiG-21s destroyed; North Vietnam claimed 17 US aircraft shot down by MiG-21s.
- 1969: U.S. destroyed three MiG-21s; one Ryan Firebee UAV destroyed by a MiG-21.
- 1970: U.S. destroyed two MiG-21s; North Vietnam claimed one F-4 Phantom and one CH-53 Sea Stallion helicopter shot down by MiG-21s.
- 1972: U.S. claimed 51 MiG-21s destroyed; North Vietnam claimed 53 US aircraft shot down by MiG-21s, including two B-52 Stratofortress bombers. Soviet General Fesenko, the main Soviet adviser to the North Vietnamese Air Force in 1972, recorded 34 MiG-21s destroyed in 1972. According to VPAF, in 1972, they lost 29 MiG-21s, 5 MiG-19s and 16 MiG-17s in aircombat

During the war, the VPAF claimed 103 F-4 Phantoms were shot down by MiG-21s, and that they lost 60 MiG-21s in air combat (54 by Phantoms).

According to Soviet data, the VPAF MiG-21s claimed 165 air victories, with the loss of 65 aircraft (including a few by accident or friendly fire) and 16 pilots. The losses of MiG-21 pilots were the lowest of all airplanes.

=== Arab–Israeli conflicts ===
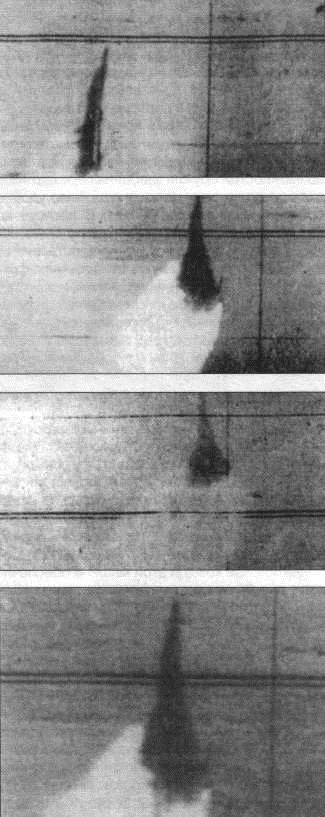
Israeli Mirage III shot down by an Egyptian MiG-21 during the Yom Kippur War

The MiG-21 was also used extensively in Middle Eastern conflicts of the 1960s, 1970s and 1980s by the Egyptian Air Force, Syrian Air Force and Iraqi Air Force. The MiG-21 first encountered Israeli Mirage IIICJs on 14 November 1964, but it was not until 14 July 1966 that the first MiG-21 was shot down. Another six Syrian MiG-21s were shot down by Israeli Mirages on 7 April 1967. MiG-21s also faced McDonnell Douglas F-4 Phantom IIs and Douglas A-4 Skyhawks, but were later outclassed by the more modern McDonnell Douglas F-15 Eagle and General Dynamics F-16 Fighting Falcon, both acquired by Israel starting in the mid-1970s. During this period, Syrian pilots flying MiG-21s also independently discovered the Cobra maneuver, which became a standard defensive maneuver under the name "zero speed maneuver" (Syrian: مناورة السرعة صفر).

During the opening attacks of the 1967 Six-Day War, the Israeli Air Force (IAF) struck Arab air forces in four attack waves. In the first wave, Israeli pilots claimed to have destroyed eight Egyptian aircraft in air-to-air combat, of which seven were MiG-21s; Egypt claimed five kills scored by MiG-21PFs. During the second wave, Israel claimed four more MiG-21s downed in air-to-air combat, with the third wave resulting claimed air victories over two Syrian and one Iraqi MiG-21. The fourth wave destroyed many more Syrian MiG-21s on the ground. Overall, Egypt lost around 100 out of about 110 MiG-21s they had, almost all on the ground; Syria lost 35 of its 60 MiG-21F-13s and MiG-21PFs in the air and on the ground.

Between the end of the Six-Day War and the start of the War of Attrition, IAF Mirage fighters scored six confirmed kills of Egyptian MiG-21s, and Egyptian MiG-21s scored two confirmed and three probable kills against Israeli aircraft. Between the end of the Six-Day War to the end of the War of Attrition, Israel claimed a total of 25 destroyed Syrian MiG-21s; the Syrians claimed three confirmed and four probable kills of Israel aircraft, although Israel denied these.

High losses to Israeli aircraft and continuous bombing during the War of Attrition caused Egypt to ask the Soviet Union for help. In March 1970, Soviet pilots and SAM crews arrived with their equipment. On 13 April, during the air battle over the Red Sea coast, the Soviet MiG-21MFs, according to some data, shot down two Israeli F-4 fighters On 18 April, one Israeli scout RF-4E "Phantom" was damaged by a Soviet MiG-21MF. On 16 May, an Israeli aircraft was shot down in air combat, probably by a Soviet MiG-21. On 22 June 1970, a Soviet pilot flying a MiG-21MF shot down an Israeli A-4E. After that, several more successful intercepts were carried out by Soviet pilots and another Israeli A-4 was shot down on 25 June.

In response, Israel planned an ambush, calling it Operation Rimon 20. On 30 July, Israeli F-4s lured Soviet MiG-21s into an area where they were ambushed by Israeli Mirages. Asher Snir, flying a Mirage IIICJ, destroyed a Soviet MiG-21; Avihu Ben-Nun and Aviam Sela, both piloting F-4Es, each got a kill, and an unidentified pilot in another Mirage scored a fourth kill against a Soviet-flown MiG-21; the IAF suffered only a damaged Mirage. Three Soviet pilots were killed and the Soviet Union was alarmed by the losses. Yet though it was a morale-boosting achievement, Rimon 20 did not change the course of the war. After the operation, other IAF aircraft were lost to Soviet MiG-21s and SAMs. A week later, on 7 August, the Soviets responded by deploying more aircraft to Egypt and luring Israeli fighter jets into an ambush of their own, "Operation Kavkaz", downing two Israeli Mirage IIICJs. In all, during March and August 1970, Soviet MiG-21 pilots and SAM crews destroyed 21 Israeli aircraft (eight by SA-3 missile systems and 13 by MiG-21s) at a cost of 5 MiG-21s shot down by the IAF, helping to convince the Israelis to sign a ceasefire.

In September 1973, a large air battle erupted between Syria and Israel; Israel claimed a total of 12 Syrian MiG-21s destroyed, while Syria claimed eight kills scored by MiG-21s and admitted five losses.

During the Yom Kippur War, Israel claimed 73 kills against Egyptian MiG-21s (65 confirmed). Egypt claimed 27 confirmed kills and eight probables against Israeli aircraft by its MiG-21s. However, according to most Israeli sources, these were exaggerated claims, as Israeli air-to-air combat losses for the entire war did not exceed fifteen.

On the Syrian front, 6 October 1973 saw a flight of Syrian MiG-21MFs shoot down an Israeli A-4E and Mirage IIICJ, losing three of their own to Israeli IAI Neshers. On 7 October, Syrian MiG-21MFs downed two Israeli F-4Es, three Mirage IIICJs and an A-4E while losing two of their MiGs to Neshers and one to an F-4E, as well as two to friendly SAM fire. Iraqi MiG-21PFs also operated on this front, and on that same day destroyed two A-4Es while losing one MiG. On 8 October 1973, Syrian MiG-21PFMs downed three F-4Es, but six of their MiG-21s were lost. By the end of the war, Syrian MiG-21s claimed a total of 30 confirmed kills against Israeli aircraft; 29 MiG-21s were claimed (26 confirmed) as destroyed by the IDF.

Later on 26 April 1974, an unusual occurrence involving Pakistani fighter pilot Flight Lieutenant Sattar Alvi took place while he was on deputation to the No. 67A Squadron of the Syrian Air Force. Alvi, flying a Syrian MiG-21F-13 (Serial No. 1863) out of Syria's Al-Dumayr Air Base with a fellow PAF pilot, was on aerial patrol near the Golan Heights when he spotted two Israeli Mirage-IIICJs intruding in Syrian airspace. According to modern Pakistani sources, Alvi and his flight leader engaged them, and after a brief dogfight, shot down one of the Mirages, flown by Captain M. Lutz. The Israeli pilot later succumbed to wounds he sustained during ejection. However, no major sources from the time reported on such an incident, and there is no mention of "Captain Lutz" in Israel's Ministry of Defense's record of Israel's casualties of war.

Between the end of the Yom Kippur War and the start of the 1982 Lebanon War, Israel received modern F-15s and F-16s which were far superior to the old Syrian MiG-21MFs. According to the IDF, these new aircraft shot down 24 Syrian MiG-21s over this period, though Syria did claim five IAF kills by MiG-21s armed with outdated K-13 missiles; Israel denied that it had suffered any losses.

The 1982 Lebanon War began on 6 June 1982, and during the conflict the IAF claimed to have destroyed about 45 Syrian MiG-21MFs. Syria confirmed the loss of 37 MiG-21s, including 24 MiG-21bis and 10 MiG-21MF downed and 2 MiG-21bis and 1 MiG-21MF written off Syria claimed two confirmed and 15 probable kills of Israeli aircraft. Two Israeli F-15s and one F-4 were damaged in combat with MiG-21s. In the largest air battle since the Korean War, one Israeli F-15 was heavily damaged by a Syrian MiG-21 firing a R-60 (missile), but was able to make back to base for repairs.

=== Syrian civil war ===
Beginning in July 2012, at which point the Syrian civil war had lasted a year without aerial action, the Syrian Air Force started operations against Syrian insurgents. MiG-21s were among the first combat-ready aircraft used in bombings, rocket attacks and strafing runs, with numerous videos showing the attacks.

The rebels had access to heavy machine guns, different anti-aircraft guns and Russian and Chinese MANPADS, up to modern designs such as the FN-6. The first loss of a MiG-21 during the Syrian civil war was recorded on 30 August 2012. The MiG, registration number 2271, was likely downed by heavy machine gun fire on takeoff or landing at Abu al-Duhur Military Airbase, under siege by rebels. A few days later, on 4 September 2012, another MiG-21 (registration number 2280) was shot down in similar circumstances at the same base, also likely on takeoff or landing by rebels using by KPV 14.5 mm machine guns; the downing was recorded on video.

On 10 November 2014, Syrian Air Force MiG-21bis number 2204 was shot down, and its pilot killed, by rebels either using a MANPADS or antiaircraft guns, near the town of Sabburah, 45 km east of Hama Airbase where it was likely based. Video and photo evidence of the crash site later emerged.

Four months after a MiG-23 was shot down and during which time the Syrian Air Force suffered no losses from enemy fire, one of its MiG-21s was shot down on 12 March 2016 by the Jaysh al-Nasr faction over Hama near Kafr Nabudah. While the Syrian Observatory for Human Rights, as suggested by video evidence, reported that the warplane had been downed by two MANPADS, Jaysh al-Nasr militants claimed to have shot it down with anti-aircraft guns. The pilot appeared to have bailed out of the stricken MiG, but died from ground fire or other causes.

On 4 March 2017, a Syrian MiG-21bis from No. 679 squadron, operating out of Hama Airbase and piloted by Col. Mohammad Sawfan, was shot down by Ahrar al-Sham rebels, crashing in Turkish territory near the border. Col. Sawfan successfully ejected but was arrested and taken to a hospital in Antakya, Turkey. A recording between the pilot and ground controller clearly showed Sawfan's disorientation due to a malfunctioning compass, followed by a failure of the entire navigation system. He could not find his way back to base as ordered and inadvertently flew within range of rebel anti-aircraft guns. After being suspended for a number of years, Sawfan was allowed to return to service.

=== Libyan–Egyptian War ===
Egypt received American Sidewinder missiles, fitting them to their MiG-21s and successfully using them in combat against Libyan Mirages and MiG-23s during the brief Egyptian–Libyan War of July 1977.

Libya vs Egypt conflicts: MiG-21s in air-to-air combat
| Date | Side | Aircraft scoring kill | Victim |
|---|---|---|---|
| 22 July 1977 | Libyan Arab Republic Air Force | Mirage 5DE | 1 MiG-21MF |
| 23 July 1977 | Egyptian Air Force | MiG-21MFs | 3 (or 4) LARAF Mirages + 1 LARAF MiG-23MS |
| 1979 | Egyptian Air Force | MiG-21MF | 1 LARAF MiG-23MS |

=== Iran–Iraq War ===
During the Iran–Iraq War, 23 Iraqi MiG-21s were shot down by Iranian F-14s, as confirmed by Iranian, Western and Iraqi sources and another 29 Iraqi MiG-21s were downed by F-4s. However, from 1980 to 1988, Iraqi MiG-21s claimed 43 Iranian aircraft shot down.

=== Libya ===
==== Libyan Civil War (2011) ====
Libyan MiG-21s saw limited service during the 2011 Libyan civil war. On 15 March 2011, one MiG-21bis and one MiG-21UM flown by defecting Libyan Air Force pilots flew from Ghardabiya Airbase near Sirte to Benina Airport to join the rebellion's Free Libyan Air Force. On 17 March 2011, the MiG-21UM experienced a technical fault and crashed after taking off from Benina.

==== Libyan Civil War (2014–2020) ====
In the Second Libyan Civil War (2014–2020), the Libyan National Army, under the command of Khalifa Haftar is loyal to the legislative body in Tobruk, which is the Libyan House of Representatives, internationally recognised until October 2015. It fights against the now internationally recognized Government of National Accord and the Shura Council of Benghazi Revolutionaries as well as Islamic State in Libya which are common enemies for both the Government of National Accord and the Libyan National Army. Both the Libyan National Army and the Government of National Accord field small airforces. As such, a number of former Libyan Arab Air Force (LARAF) MiG-21s were returned to service with the Tobruk-based Libyan National Army, thanks to spare parts and technical assistance from Egypt and Russia, while a number of former Egyptian Air Force MiG-21s were pressed into service as well. MiG-21s under the control of the Libyan House of Representatives have been used extensively to bomb forces loyal to the rival General National Congress in Benghazi during the 2014 Libyan Civil War.

On 29 August 2014, an LNA MiG-21bis, serial number 208, after a bombing mission over Derna, crashed in Bayda according to an official statement as a result of a technical failure of the plane, while Islamist Shura Council of Benghazi Revolutionaries claimed it was shot down. The pilot did not eject and died in the crash.

On 2 September 2014 an LNA MiG-21bis, serial number 800, crashed in a city block of Tobruk, due to pilot error during a pull-up maneuver. It is unclear whether the pilot had been on a bombing mission on the way to Derna, further East, or had been performing an aerial ceremony for the MiG-21 pilot who died a few days earlier.

Part of the 2019 Western Libya offensive, on 9 April 2019, a Libyan National Army MiG-21 made a low altitude diving rocket attack, probably firing S-24 rockets on Mitiga airport in Tripoli, making limited damages to one of the runways. On 14 April 2019, a Libyan National Army MiG-21MF was shot down by a surface-to-air missile, probably a MANPADS fired by the forces of the Libyan Government of National Accord (GNA) south of Tripoli. Video evidence confirmed the MiG-21 came under fire from anti-aircraft guns, small arms and two SAMs, one of which apparently hit the target. The pilot, Colonel Jamal Ben Amer ejected safely and recovered to LNA-held territory by a Mi-35 helicopter. LNA sources confirmed the loss but blamed a technical problem.

=== Horn of Africa ===
During the Ogaden War of 1977–78, Ethiopian Air Force F-5As engaged Somali Air Force MiG-21MFs in combat on several occasions. In one lopsided incident, two F-5As engaged four MiG-21MFs carrying out a bombing mission. The F-5As destroyed two while the surviving pilots collided with each other avoiding an AIM-9.

Ethiopia claimed to have shot down 10 Somali MiG-21MFs; while Somalian Mig-21s claimed to have destroyed four Ethiopian MiG-21MFs, one Canberra bomber and three Douglas DC-3s. Ethiopian MiG-21s were deployed largely in the ground attack role during the final offensive against Somali ground forces.

Ethiopian pilots who had flown both the F-5E and the MiG-21 and received training in both the US and the USSR considered the F-5 to be the superior fighter because of its manoeuvrability at low to medium speeds, its superior instrumentation and the fact that it was far easier to fly, allowing the pilot to focus on combat rather than controlling his airplane. This effect was enhanced by the poor quality of pilot training provided by the Soviets, which provided limited flight time and focussed exclusively on taking off and landing, with no practical training in air combat.

=== Angola ===
Despite extensive losses to man-portable air-defense systems, MiG-21s were instrumental during the Battle of Cuito Cuanavale; Cuban pilots became accustomed to flying up to three sorties a day. Both the MiG-21MF and the MiG-21bis were deployed almost exclusively in the fighter/bomber role. As interceptors, they were somewhat unsuccessful due to their inability to detect low-flying South African aircraft. On 6 November 1981, a Mirage F1CZ achieved South Africa's first confirmed air-to-air kill since the Korean War when it destroyed Cuban Lieutenant Danacio Valdez's MiG-21MF with 30mm cannon fire. On 5 October 1982, Mirages escorting an English Electric Canberra on routine reconnaissance over Cahama were engaged by at least two MiG-21bis. A South African radar operator picked up the attacking MiGs and was able to alert the Mirage pilots in advance, instructing them to change course immediately. As they jettisoned their auxiliary tanks, however, they were pinpointed by the Cubans, who opened pursuit. In a vicious dogfight, SAAF Major John Rankin closed range and maneuvered into the MiGs' rear cones. From there, one of his two R.550 Magic missiles impacted directly behind the lead MiG and forced it down. The second aircraft, piloted by Lieutenant Raciel Marrero Rodriguez, could not detect the Mirage's proximity until it had entered his turn radius and was perforated by Rankin's autocannon. This damaged MiG-21 landed safely at Lubango.

Contacts between MiG-21s and SAAF Mirage F1s or Mirage IIIs became increasingly common throughout the 1980s. Between 1984 and 1988, thirteen MiG-21s were lost over Angola. On 9 August 1984, a particularly catastrophic accident occurred when the 9th Fighter Training Squadrons and the 12th Fighter Squadrons of the Cuban Air Force attempted to carry out an exercise in poor weather. A single MiG-21bis and three MiG-23s were lost.

On 14 December 1988, an Angolan Air Force MiG-21bis, serial number C340, strayed off course and being low on fuel executed an emergency landing on an open field in South West Africa, modern-day Namibia, where it was seized by local authorities. Since Angola did not request its return after the South African Border War, the MiG was restored by Atlas Aviation and until September 2017 it was displayed at Swartkops Air Force Base, Pretoria. The jet was returned to Angola, flying in an Angolan Il-76 cargo plane, as a sign of goodwill on 15 September 2017.

=== Democratic Republic of the Congo ===
The MiG-21MFs of the 25th Fighter Aviation Regiment of the National Air Force of Angola flew ground sorties during the Second Congo War, sometimes being piloted by mercenaries. Some six MiG-21s were imported into the country during the First Congo War for the Congo Air Force, but do not appear to have seen operational service. (Cooper and Weinert, "African MiGs: Volume 1: Angola to Ivory Coast").

=== Yugoslavia ===
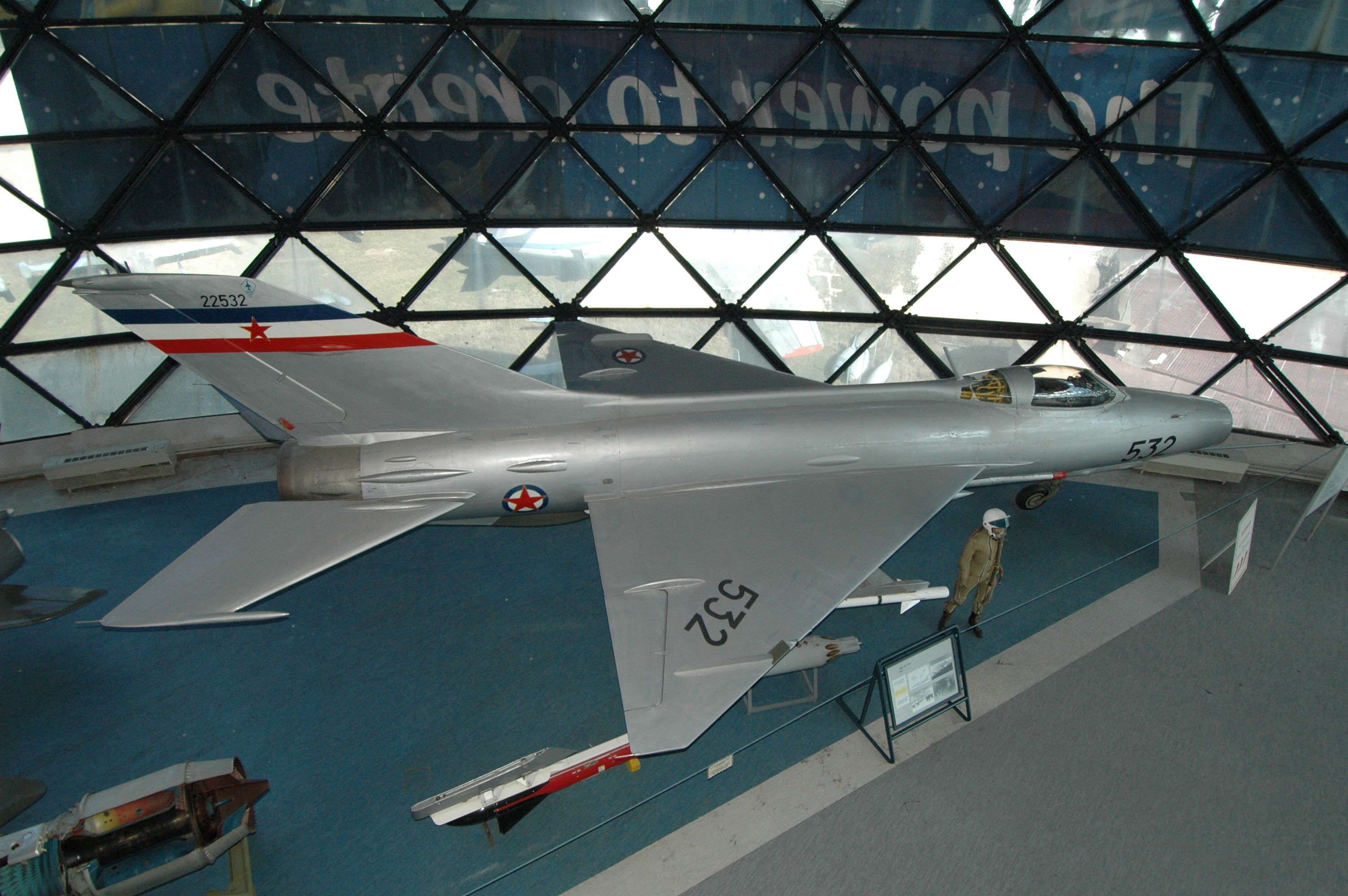
A Yugoslav Air Force MiG-21F-13

Yugoslavia purchased its first batch of MiG-21s in 1962 from the Soviet Union. From 1962 to the early 1980s, Yugoslavia purchased 261 MiG-21s, of ten different variants. There were 41 MiG-21f-13, 36 MiG-21PfM, 25 MiG-21M, 6 MiG-21MF, 46 MiG-21bis, 45 MiG-21bisK, 12 MiG-21R, 18 MiG-21U, 25 MiG-21UM, and 7 MiG-21US. Yugoslav Air force units that operated MiG-21s were the 204th Fighter-Aviation Regiment at Batajnica Air Base (126th, 127th and 128th Fighter-Aviation Squadrons), 117th Fighter-Aviation Regiment at Željava Air Base (124th and 125th Fighter-Aviation Squadron and 352nd Recon Squadron), 83rd Fighter-Aviation Regiment at Slatina Air Base (123rd and 130th Fighter Aviation Squadron), 185th Fighter-Bomber-Aviation Squadron (129th Fighter-Aviation Squadron) at Pula and 129th Training Center at Batajnica Air Base.

During the early stages of the 1990s' Yugoslav wars, the Yugoslav military used MiG-21s in a ground-attack role, while Croatian and Slovene forces did not yet have air forces at that point in the conflict. Aircraft from air bases in Slovenia, Croatia, and Bosnia and Herzegovina were relocated to air bases in Serbia. Detailed records show at least seven MiG-21s were shot down by AA defenses in Croatia and Bosnia. A MiG-21 piloted by a Serbian Yugoslav Air Force pilot shot down an EC helicopter in 1992.

Croatia acquired three MiG-21s in 1992 through defections by Croatian pilots serving with the JNA, two of which were lost in subsequent actions – one to Serbian air defenses, the other a friendly fire accident. In 1993, Croatia purchased about 40 MiG-21s in violation of an arms embargo, but only about 20 of these entered service, while the rest were used for spare parts. Croatia used them alongside the sole remaining defector for ground attack missions in Operations Flash (during which one was lost) and Storm. The only air-to-air action for Croatian MiGs was an attempt by two of them to intercept Soko J-22 Oraos of Republika Srpska's air force on a ground attack mission on 7 August 1995. After some maneuvering, both sides disengaged without firing.

The remaining Yugoslav MiG-21s were flown to Serbia by 1992 and continued their service in the newly created Federal Republic of Yugoslavia. During the 1999 NATO bombing of Yugoslavia, three MiG-21s were destroyed on the ground. The type continued to serve with the Serbian Air Force until 25 September 2020, when the country's last active MiG-21 crashed in the village of Brasina, near Mali Zvornik, killing both pilots. The aircraft, a MiG-21UM that left the assembly line in December 1986, was the last MiG-21 ever produced in the Soviet Union.

=== Romania ===
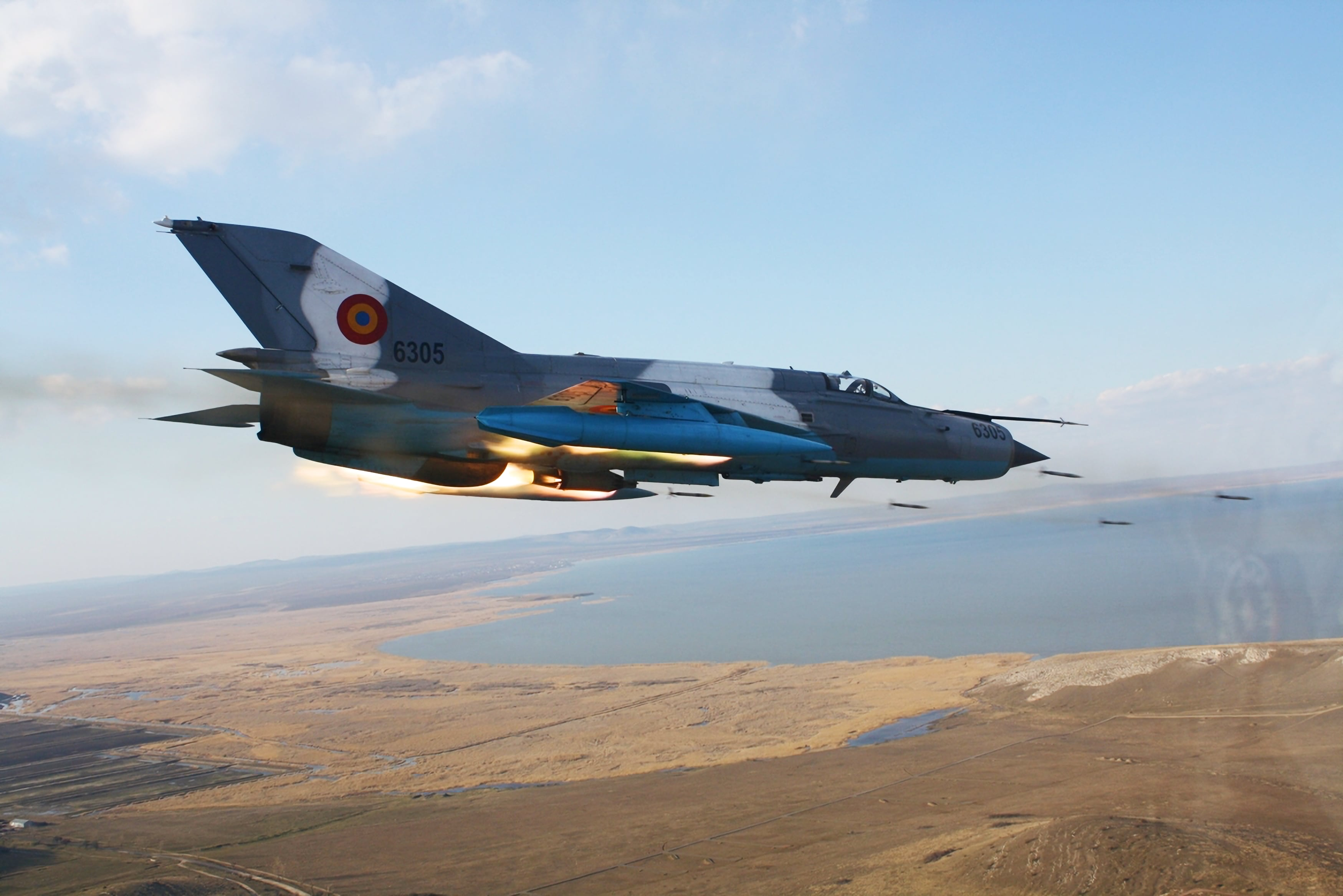
A Romanian Air Force MiG-21 LanceR C during a training exercise

In 1962, Romanian Air Force (RoAF) received the first 12 MiG-21F-13, followed by another 12 of the same variant in 1963. Deliveries continued over the next years with other variants: 38 aircraft of MiG-21RFM (PF) variant in 1965, 7 MiG-21U-400/600 in 1965–1968, 56 MiG-21RFMM (PFM) in 1966–1968, 12 MiG-21R in 1968–1972, 68 MiG-21M plus 11 MiG-21US in 1969–1970, 74 MiG-21MF/MF-75 in 1972–1975, and 27 MiG-21UM in 1972–1980 plus another 5 of the same variant in 1990, for a total number of 322 aircraft.

In 1995–2002, a total of 111 MiG-21s were modernized, of which 71 were M and MF/MF-75 variants modernized under the LanceR A designation (for ground attack), 14 were UM variant as LanceR B designation (trainer), and another 26 MF/MF-75 variant were modernized under LanceR C designation (air superiority). Today, only 36 LanceRs are operational for the RoAF. It can use both Western and Eastern armament such as the R-60M, R-73, Magic 2, or Python III missiles.

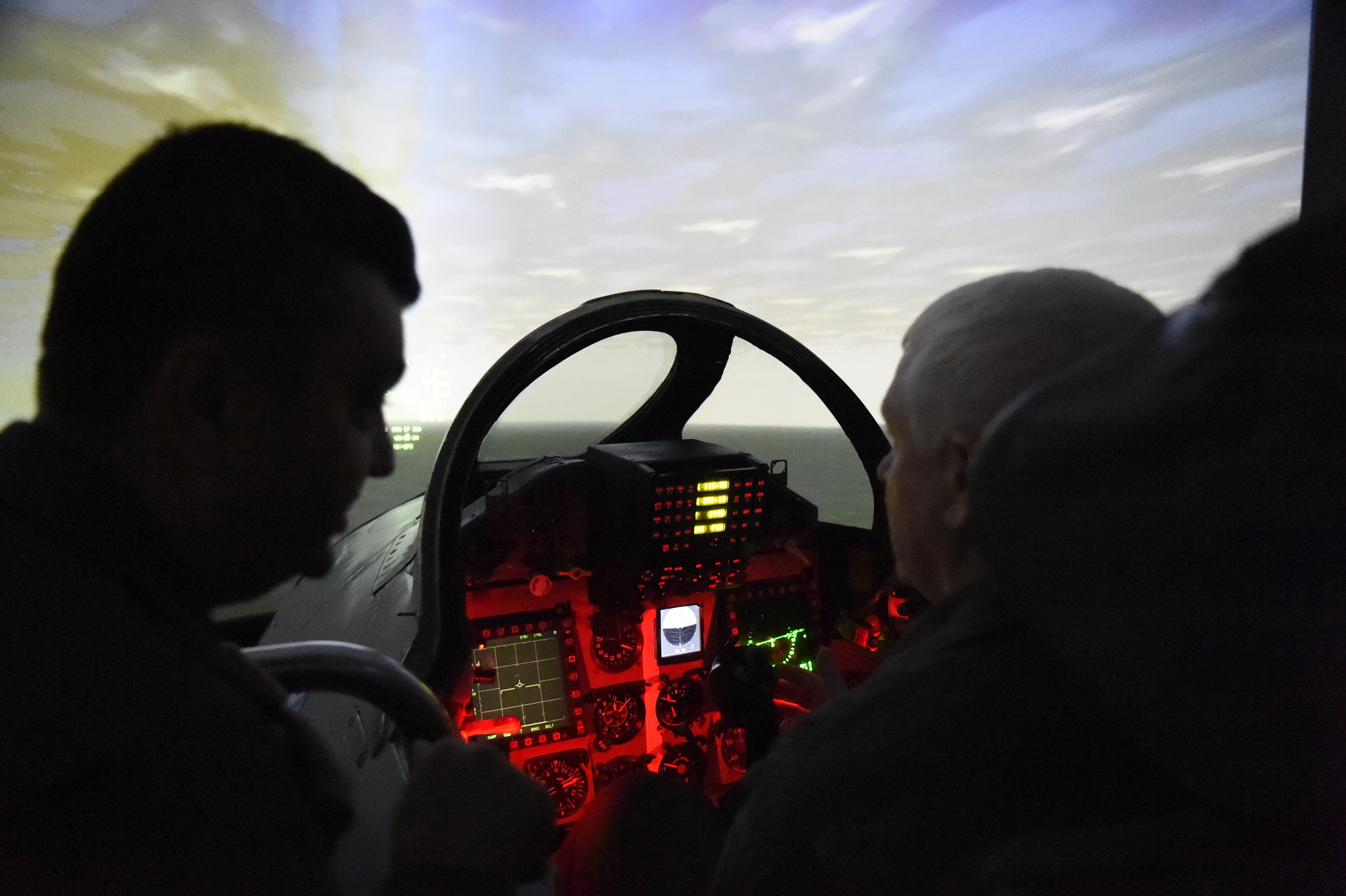
MiG-21 LanceR simulator cockpit view

The MiG-21s are to be retired in 2024, after another two F-16 squadrons will be ready following the purchase of 32 more F-16s from Norway.

Despite being one of the newest MiG-21 fleets in service, the Romanian MiG-21 LanceR fleet was grounded due to difficulties maintaining the aircraft, and since 1996 it has had an accident rate of over 30 per 100,000 hours. Serviceability rates below 50% are not uncommon.

The Romanian Air Force has suffered numerous events in recent years with its arsenal of MiG-21s. On 12 June 2017, a MiG-21 crashed in Constanța County, with Adrian Stancu, the pilot, managing to escape in time. On 7 July 2018, Florin Rotaru died during an airshow in Borcea with some 3,000 attendants while piloting a MiG-21 that suffered technical difficulties, choosing to deflect the plane and die to protect the attendants rather than ejecting himself in time. On 20 April 2021, during a training flight, a MiG-21 crashed in an uninhabited zone in Mureș County. The pilot, Andrei Criste, managed to eject safely and survived the crash.

On the March 2nd 2022, A MiG-21 LanceR crashed during adverse weather conditions near the village of Gura Dobrogei, Cogealac Commune. On 15 April 2022, the RoAF suspended all MiG-21 LanceR flights due to the high rate of accidents, and announced that it planned to speed up the acquisition of the ex-Norwegian F-16s. On 23 May, the LanceRs resumed flights for a period of one year, until 15 May 2023. On 15 May 2023, a retirement ceremony was held for the aircraft at the 71st Air Base, and at the 86th Air Base. From there, the MiG-21 took off to their final destination at the 95th Air Base.

=== Bulgaria ===
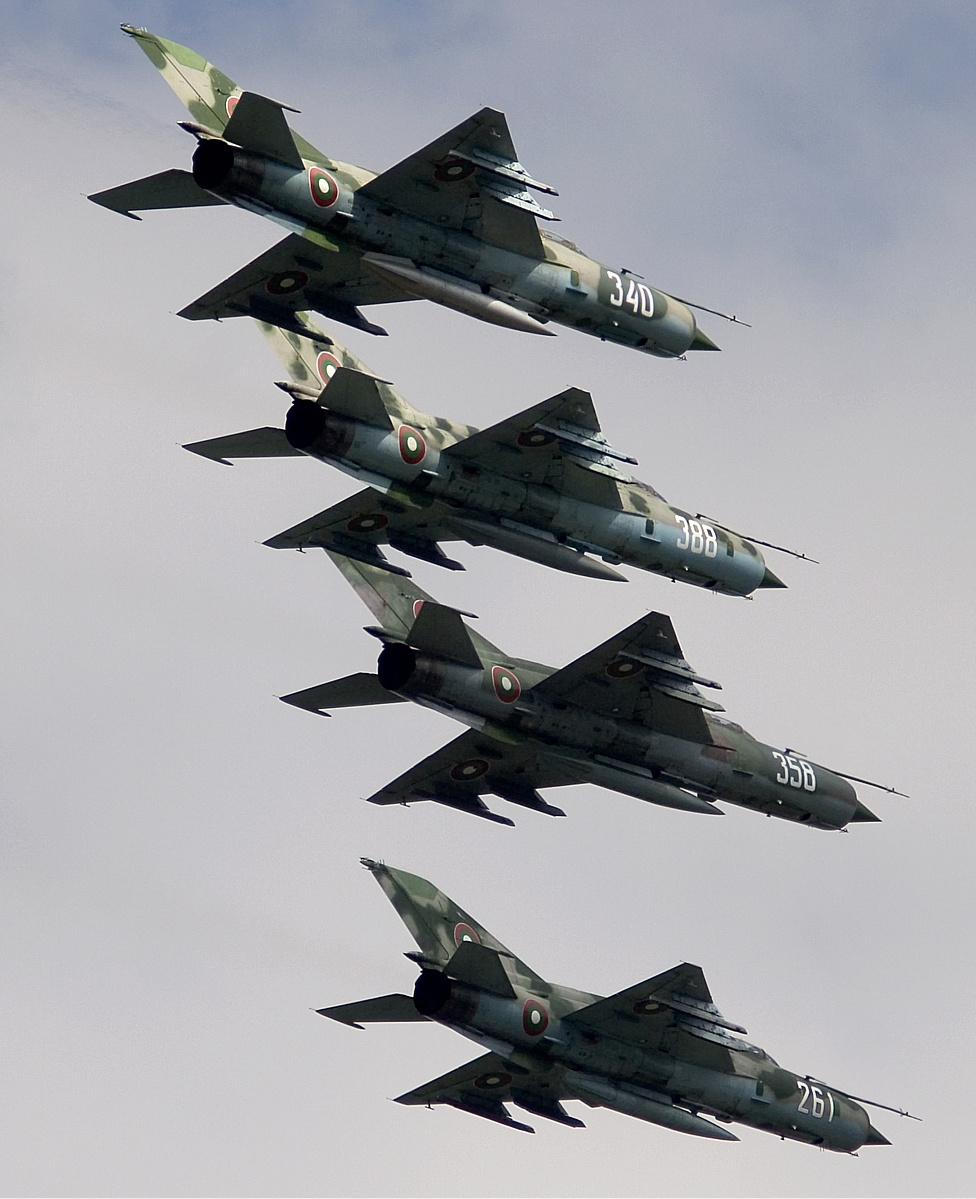
MiG-21bis fighters of the Bulgarian Air Force

The Bulgarian Air Force received a total of 224 MiG-21 aircraft. From September 1963 the 19th Fighter Regiment of the Air Force received 12 MiG-21F-13s. Later some of these aircraft were converted for reconnaissance as MiG-21F-13Rs, which were submitted to the 26th Reconnaissance Regiment in 1988. In January 1965 the 18th Fighter Regiment received a squadron of 12 MiG-21PFs, some of which also were converted and used as reconnaissance aircraft (MiG-oboznachevnieto 21PFR). The 26 Regiment reconnaissance aircraft from this squadron were removed from service in 1991, the 15 Fighter Regiment in 1965 received another 12 MiG-21PF fighters and in 1977–1978 operated another 36 refurbished aircraft. This unit received two more aircraft in 1984 and operated them until 1992.

For reconnaissance, a regiment received 26 specialized reconnaissance MiG-21Rs in 1962, and in 1969–1970, 19 Fighter Aviation Regiment received 15 MiG-21m aircraft, which operated in 21 Fighter Aviation Regiment and were removed from active service in 1990. An additional 12 MiG-21MF fighters were received in 1974–1975, with a reconnaissance version of the MiG-21MFR provided to the 26th Reconnaissance Regiment and used until 2000, when removed from active service.

From 1983 to 1990, the Bulgaria Air Force received 72 MiG-21bis. Of these, 30 (six new and renovated) are under option with ACS and provided to the 19th Fighter Regiment; the rest are equipped with the "Lazur". This batch was taken out of service in 2000.

Besides fighters, the Air Force has received 39 MiG-21U trainers (one in 1966), five MiG-21US in 1969–1970 and 27 MiG-21UM (new) during 1974–1980, another six refurbished ex-Soviet examples in 1990. In 1982, three MiG-21UM trainers were sold to Cambodia and in 1994 another 10 examples. MiG-21UMs were also sold to India. Other training aircraft were removed from active service in 2000. A total of 38 aircraft were lost in the period 1963–2000.

The last flight of a Bulgarian Air Force MiG-21 took off from Graf Ignatievo Air Base on 31 December 2015. On 18 December 2015, there was an official ceremony for the retirement of the type from active duty.

=== Known MiG-21 aces ===
Several pilots have attained ace status (five or more aerial victories/kills) while flying the MiG-21. Nguyễn Văn Cốc of the VPAF, who scored nine kills in MiG-21s is regarded as the most successful. Twelve other VPAF pilots were credited with five or more aerial victories while flying the MiG-21: Phạm Thanh Ngân, Nguyễn Hồng Nhị and Mai Văn Cường (all eight kills); Đặng Ngọc Ngự (seven kills), Vũ Ngọc Đỉnh, Nguyễn Ngọc Độ, Nguyễn Nhật Chiêu, Lê Thanh Đạo, Nguyễn Đăng Kỉnh, Nguyễn Đức Soát, and Nguyễn Tiến Sâm (six kills each), and Nguyễn Văn Nghĩa (five kills).

Additionally, three Syrian pilots are known to have attained ace status while flying the MiG-21. Syrian airmen: M. Mansour recorded five solo kills (with one additional probable), B. Hamshu scored five solo kills, and A. el-Gar tallied four solo and one shared kill, all three during the 1973–1974 engagements against Israel.

Due to the incomplete nature of available records, there are several pilots who have unconfirmed aerial victories (probable kills), which when confirmed would award them "Ace" Status: S. A. Razak of the Iraqi Air Force with four known kills scored during the Iran–Iraq War (until 1991; sometimes referred to as the Persian Gulf War), A. Wafai of the Egyptian Air Force with four known kills against Israel.

== Operators ==
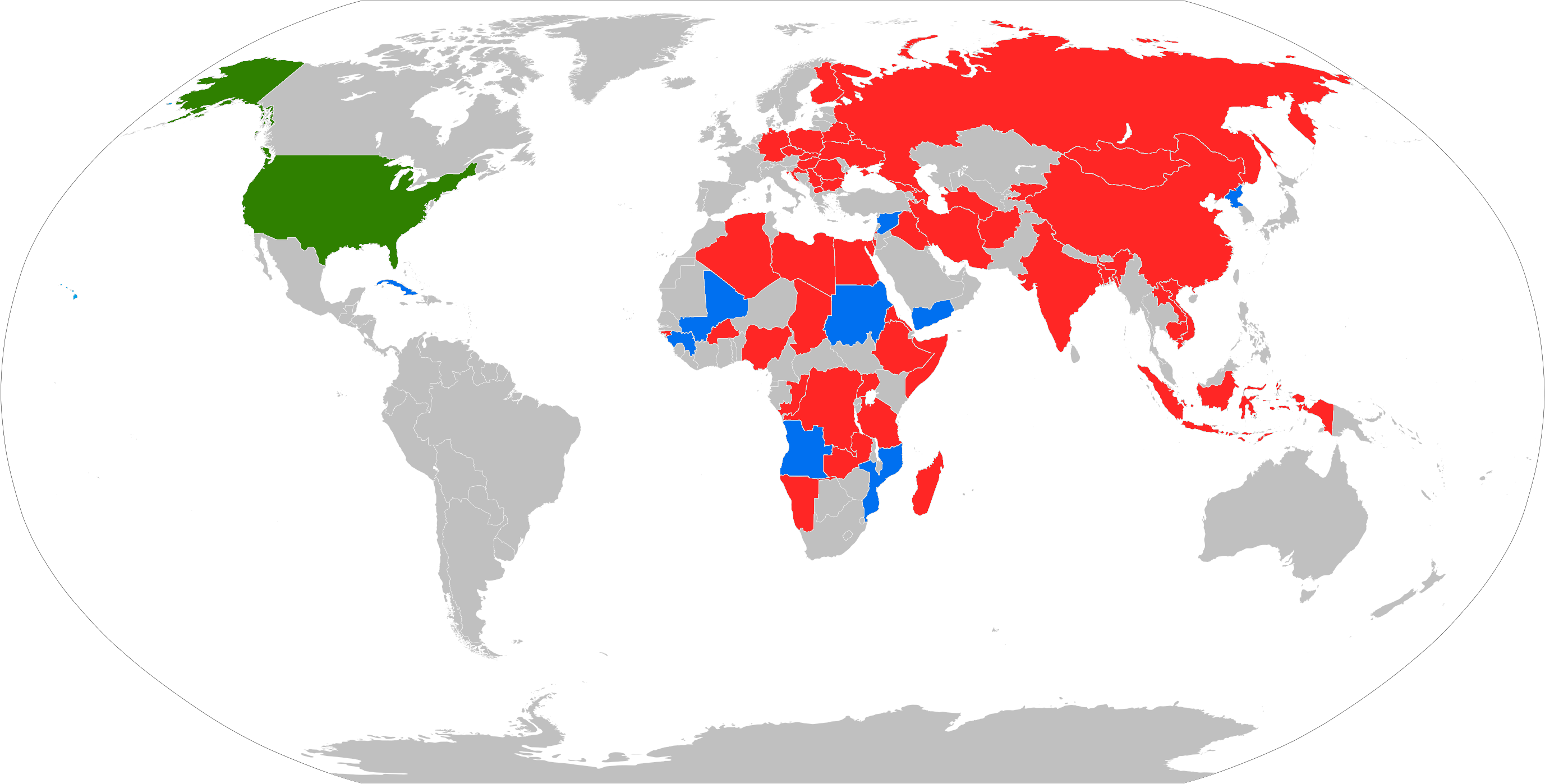
MiG-21 operators: Current Former Captured

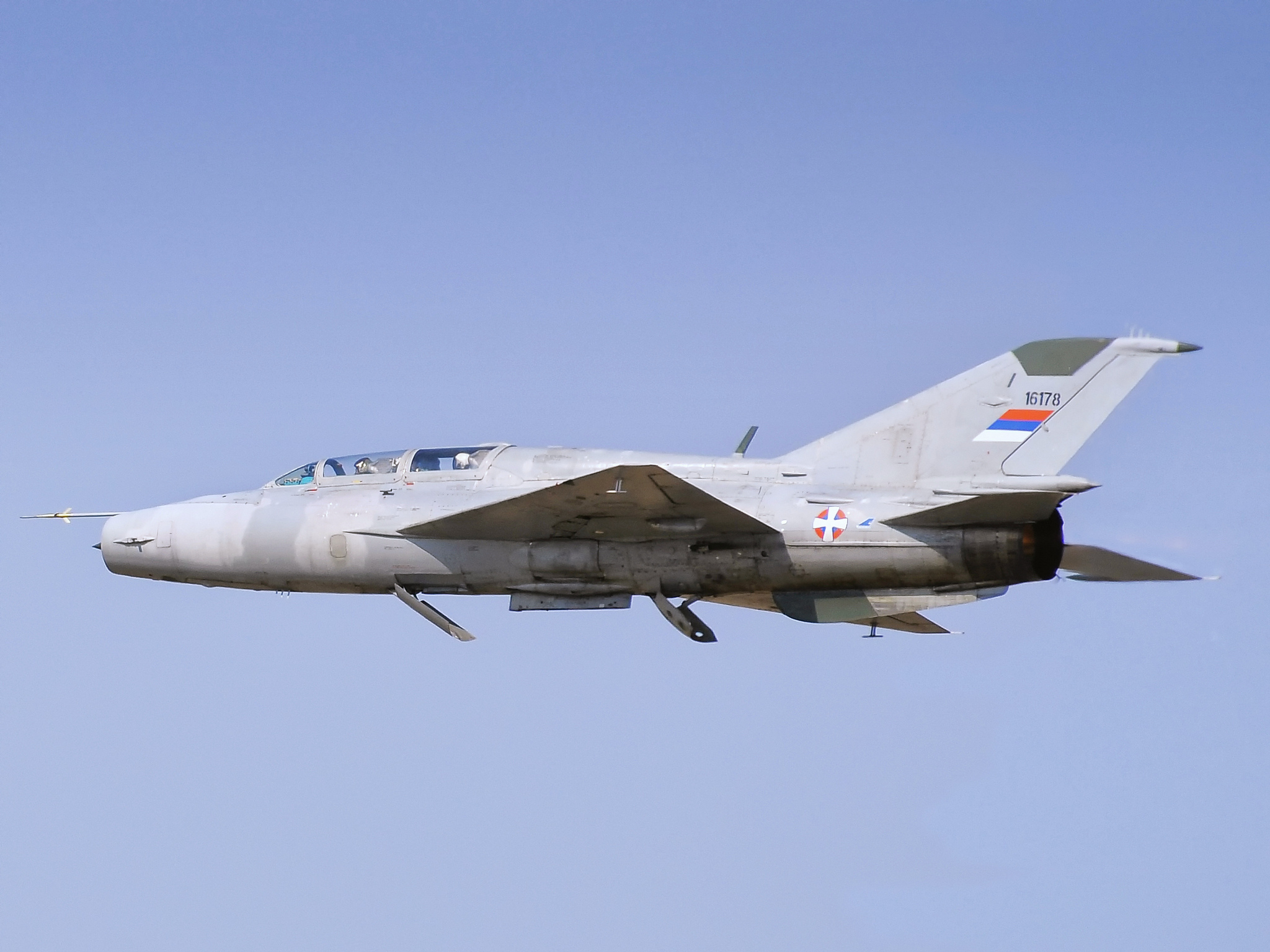
Serbian Air Force MiG-21UM

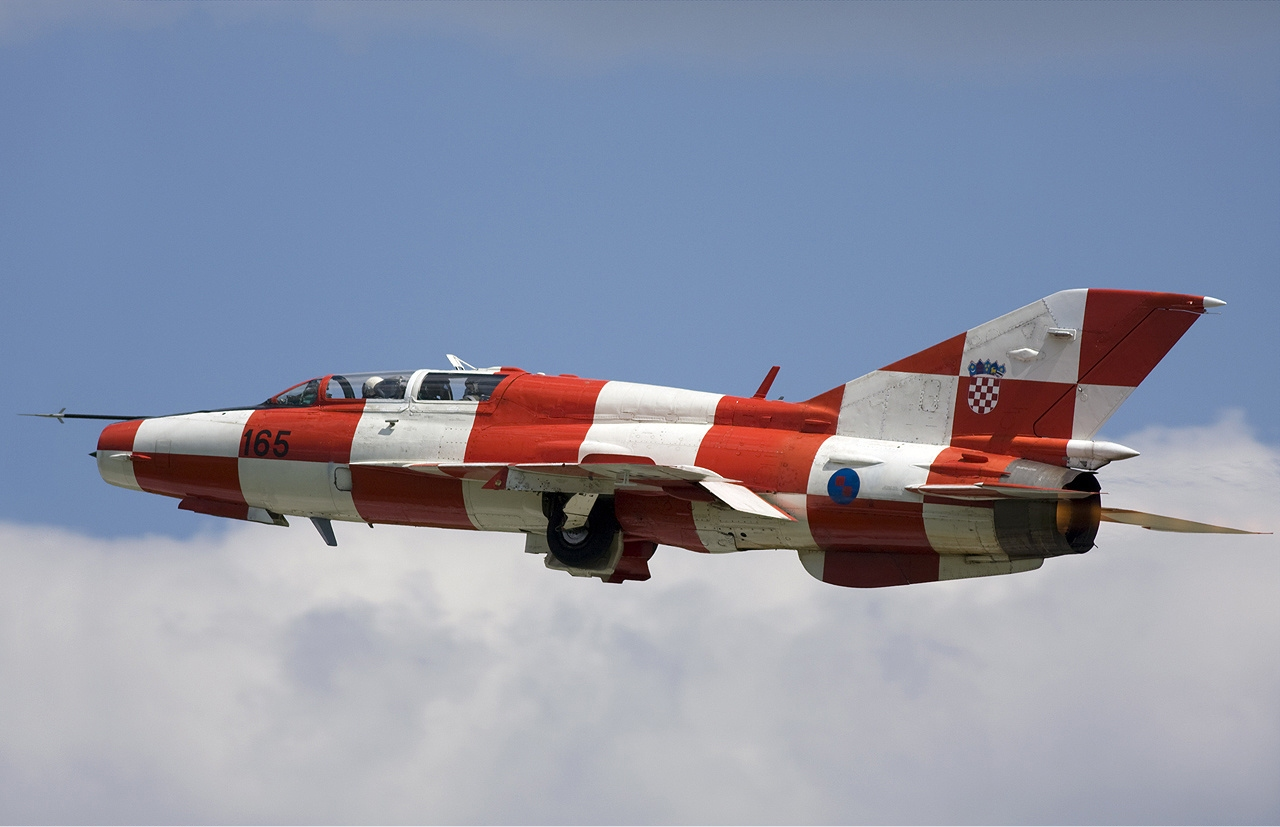
Croatian Air Force MiG-21UMD in unique promotional paint scheme

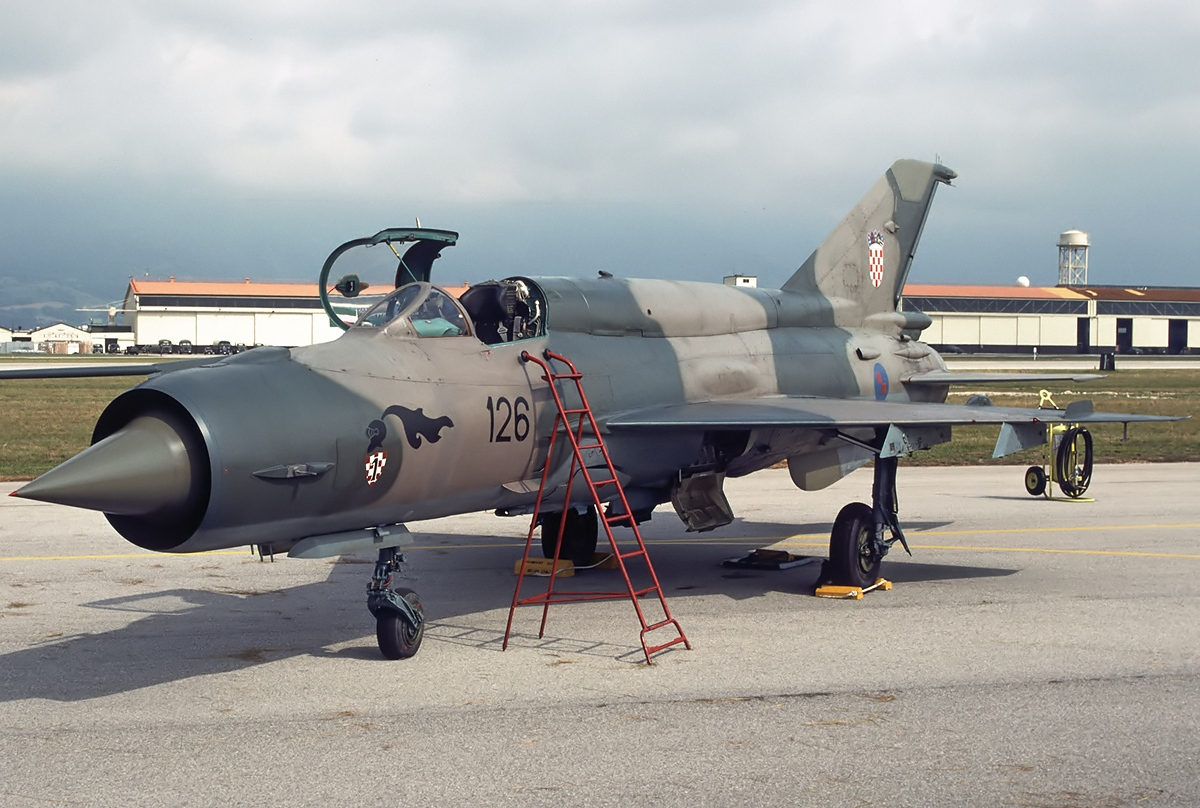
Croatian MiG-21bis 1996

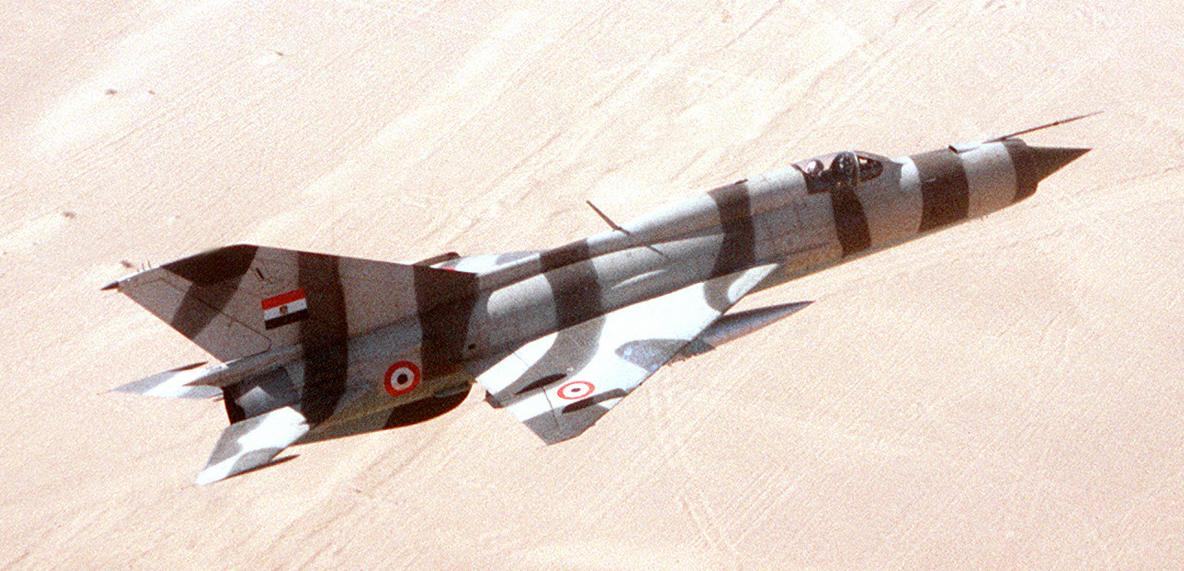
Egyptian MiG-21PFM in 1982

=== Current operators ===
This list does not include operators of Chinese copies / licensed manufactured versions known as the Chengdu J-7/F-7.

- Libya
  - Libyan Air Force - 9 in service as of 2026.
- Mali
  - Malian Air Force – 9 aircraft in service as of December 2023.
- Mozambique
  - Mozambique Air Force – 8 aircraft, comprising 6 MiG-21bis and 2 MiG-21UM trainers are in service as of 2023.
- North Korea
  - North Korean Air Force – 26 in service as of 2023.

=== Former operators ===
A Bulgarian MiG-21 taxis at Graf Ignatievo Air Base, Bulgaria during a bilateral exercise between the U.S. and Bulgarian Air Force

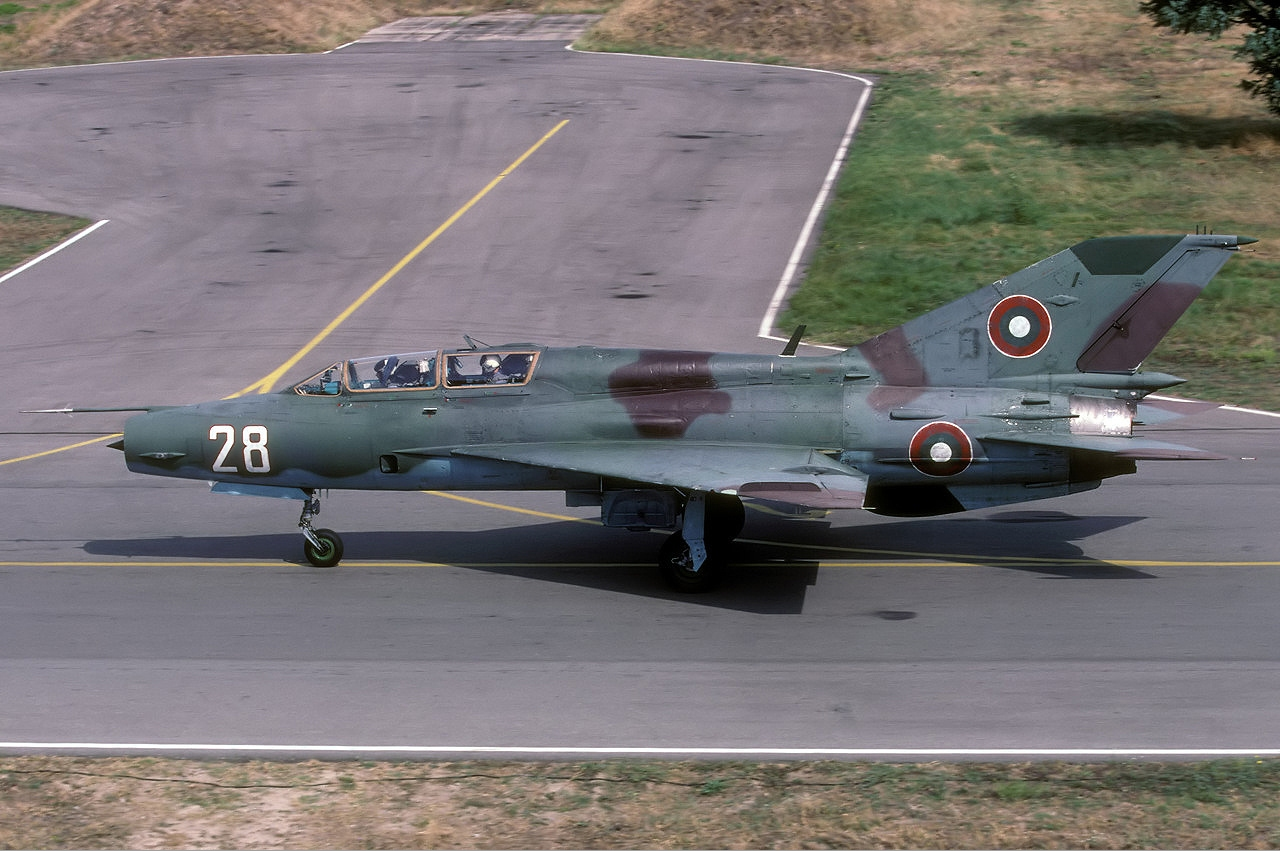
Bulgarian Air Force MiG-21UB

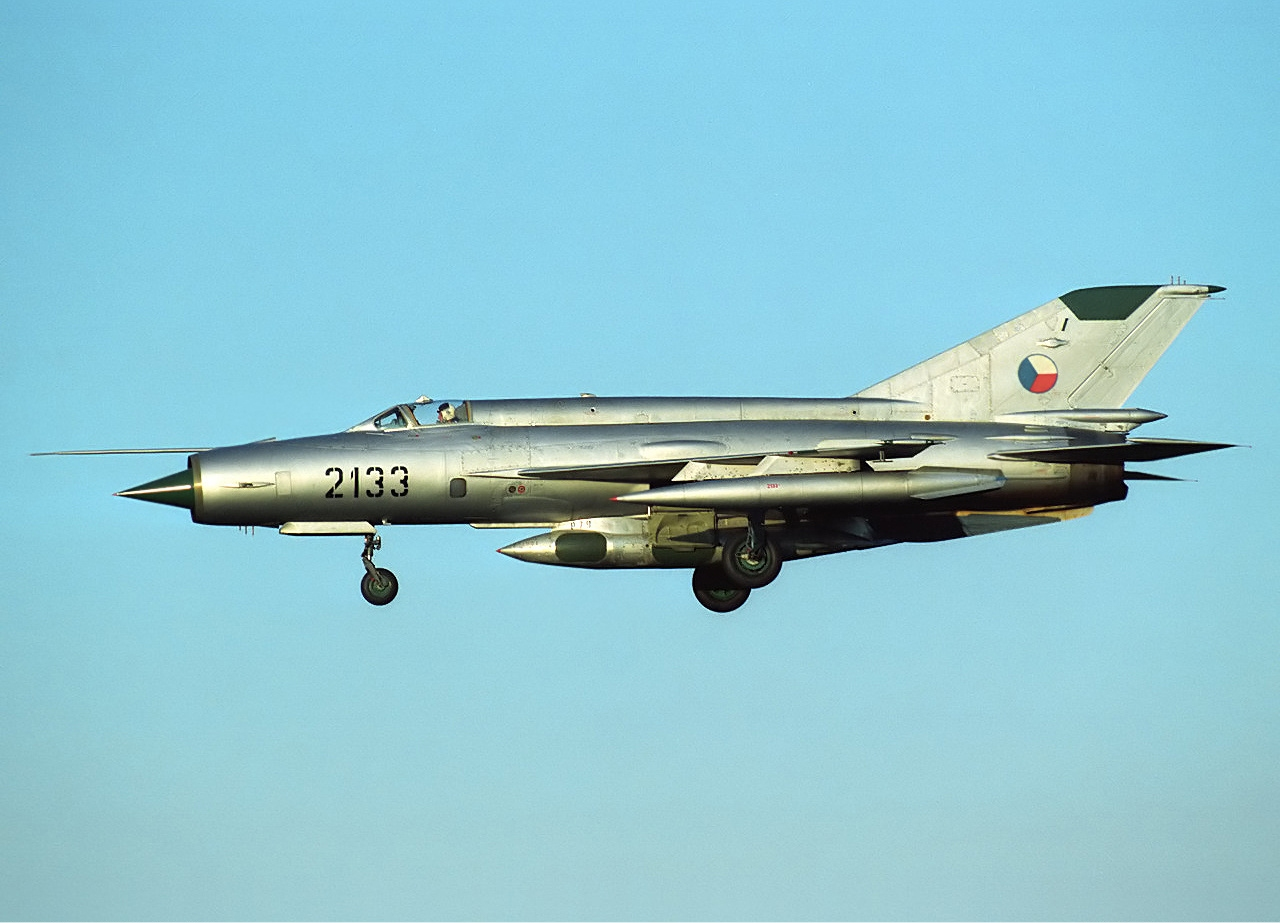
Czechoslovak Air Force MiG-21R

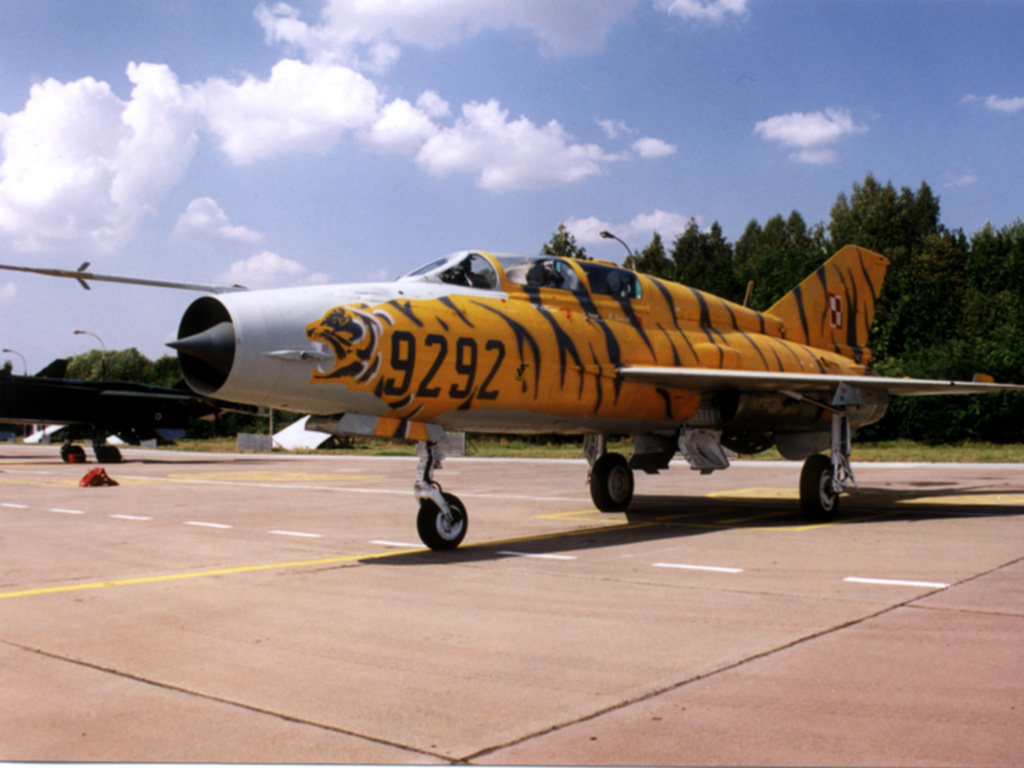
Two-seat Polish Air Force MiG-21UM with 3rd Tactical Squadron markings

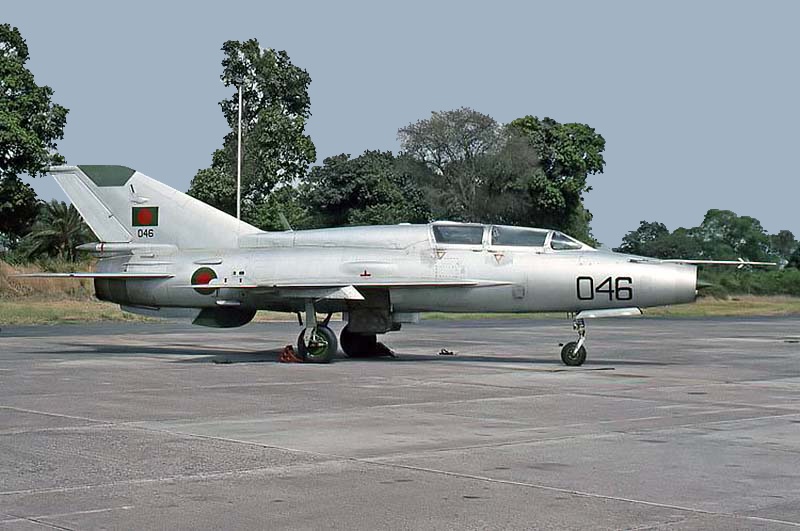
Bangladesh Air Force MiG-21UBM

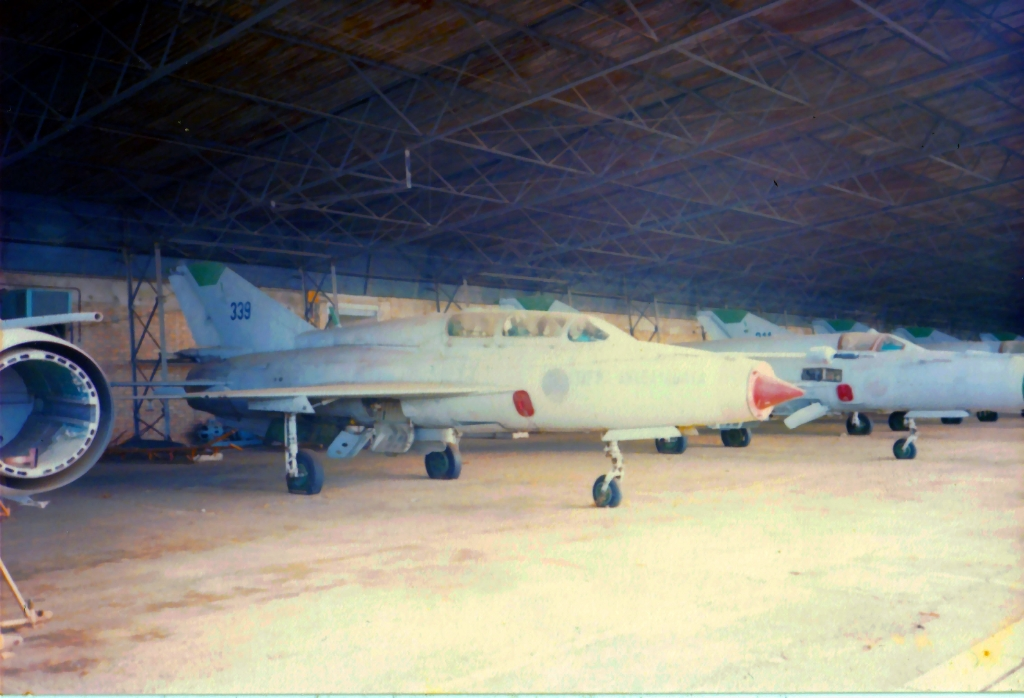
Derelict Malagasy MiG-21UMs

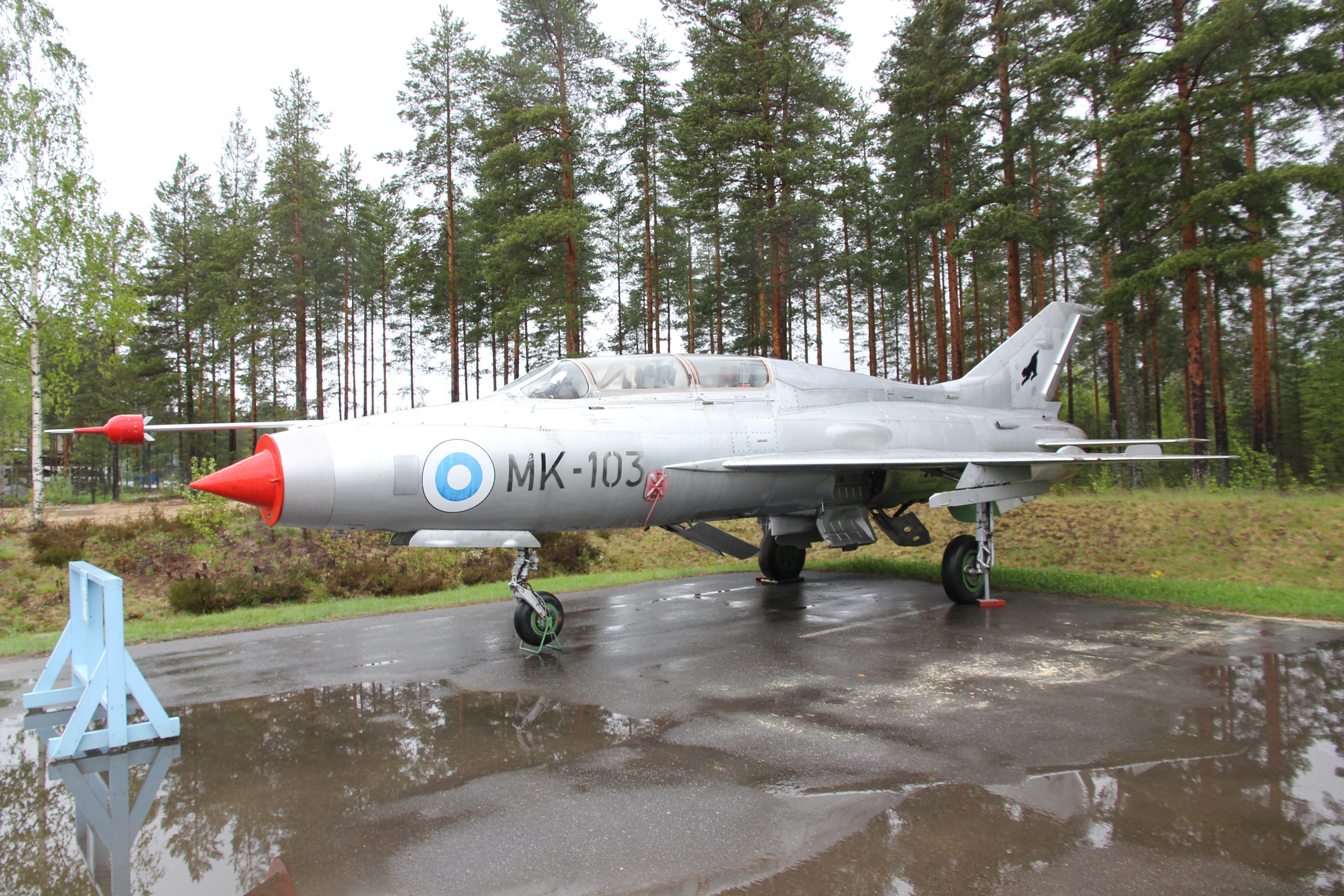
MiG-21U (MK-103) in the Aviation Museum of Central Finland

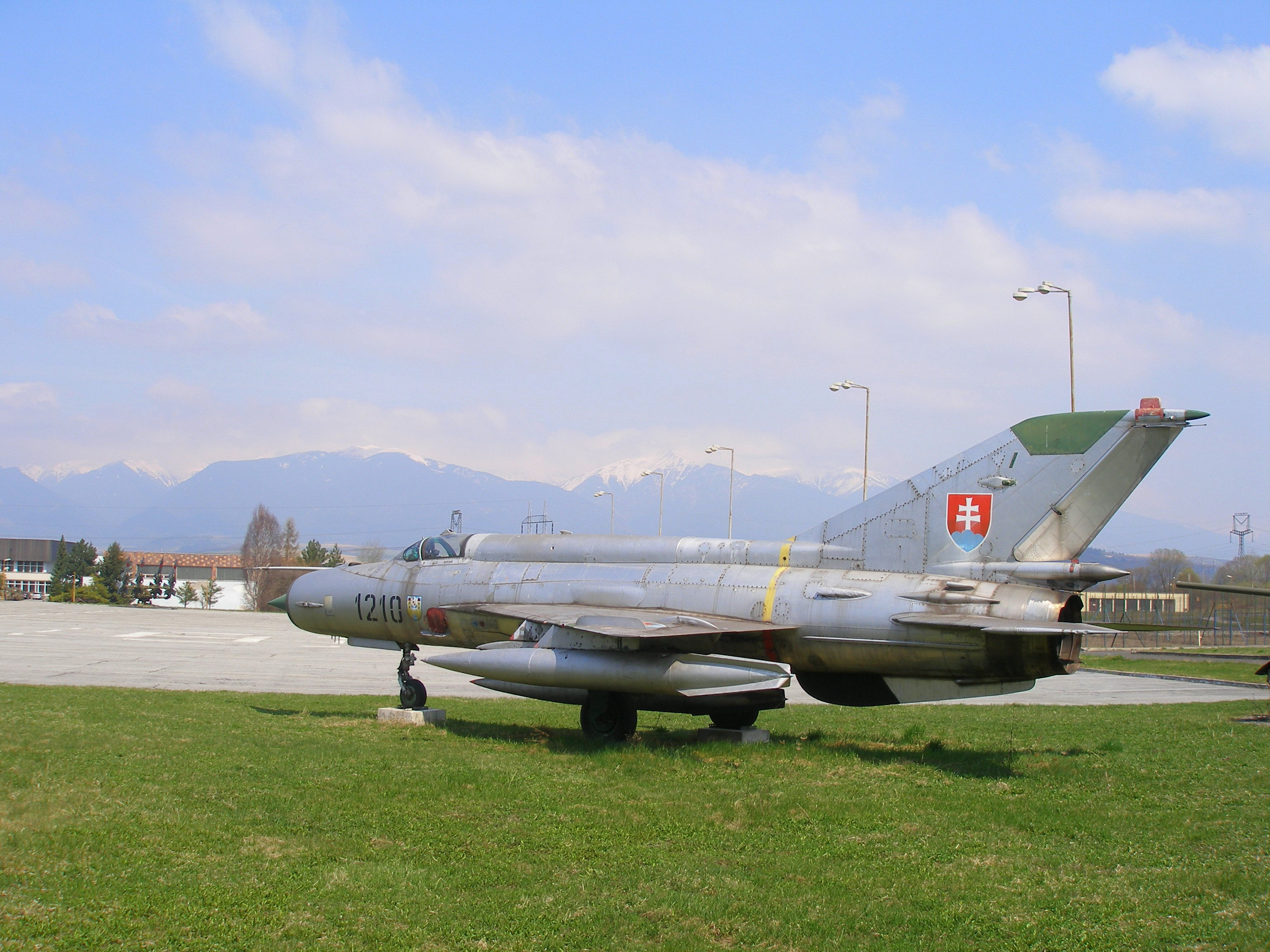
Slovak Air Force MiG-21MA on display in Liptovský Mikuláš, 2011

- Afghanistan
  - Royal Afghan Air Force − 50 MiG-21F-13s and MiG-21Us
  - Afghan Air Force − 46 MiG-21MFs and MiG-21UMs, and 40 MiG-21bis. Several were shot down or destroyed on the ground during the Second Afghan Civil War
  - Taliban − About 20 MiG-21s in 2000, used in the ground attack role
  - National Islamic Movement of Afghanistan − About 30 MiG-21s in 2000
- Algeria
  - Algerian Air Force
- Angola
  - National Air Force of Angola – 23 in service as of 2021
- Azerbaijan
  - Azerbaijan Air Force - Operated about a dozen acquired from Ukraine. None in service today.
- Bangladesh
  - Bangladesh Air Force – 10 Mig-21MF's and 2 Mig-21UB's were donated to Bangladesh in the 1970s by Soviet Union. Operated from 1973 and all retired in the 2000s, replaced by F-7's.
- Belarus
  - Belarusian Air Force
- Bulgaria
  - Bulgarian Air Force
- Burkina Faso
  - Burkina Faso Air Force
- Cambodia
  - Royal Cambodian Air Force - 19 MiG-21bis and 3 MiG-21UM until all were retired in 2010.
- China
  - People's Liberation Army Air Force – replaced by the Chengdu J-7, a license-built version of the MiG-21. In addition to MiG-21F-13s supplied by the Soviet Union, China also traded a small amount of MiG-21MFs with J-7 export variations, then developed the J-7C/D variants based on the MiG-21MF. The deal was between China and a certain Middle Eastern country. In May 2013, an official publication from Chengdu Aircraft Corporation reported that J-7 production had ceased after decades of manufacturing variations of this Chinese-made MiG-21.
- Republic of the Congo
  - Congolese Air Force – 14, in storage as of 2004
- Croatia
  - Croatian Air Force – In November 2024, the last remaining MiG-21s (four fighters and two trainers) were retired.
- Cuba
  - Cuban Air Force – All fixed-wing aircraft retired in 2026.
- Czechoslovakia
  - Czechoslovak People's Air Force – passed on to the Czech Republic and Slovakia.
- Czech Republic
  - Czech Air Force
- East Germany
  - Air Forces of the National People's Army – passed on to Germany after reunification.
- Egypt
  - Egyptian Air Force
- Eritrea
  - Eritrean Air Force
- Ethiopia
  - Ethiopian Air Force
- Finland
  - Finnish Air Force
- Guinea-Bissau
  - Guinea-Bissau Air Force
- Germany
  - Luftwaffe
- Georgia
  - Georgian Air Force
- Hungary
  - Hungarian Air Force
- India
  - Indian Air Force – retired from operational service on 26 September 2025
- Indonesia
  - Indonesian Air Force
- Iran
  - Iranian Air Force – purchased 12 ex-East German MiG-21PFMs plus four MiG-21Us for training purposes. However, only two MiG-21Us were delivered, the others being embargoed after German reunification currently have 12 Chengdu J-7 for training purposes.
- Iraq
  - Iraqi Air Force – operated during Saddam Hussein's Era.
- Israel
  - Israeli Air Force – acquired as part of Operation Diamond. Currently in Israeli Air Force Museum
- ISIL
  - Military of ISIL – captured 19 (1 operational). Originally three in operational condition. The Syrian Air Force claimed to have shot down two of them. Other airframes are in various states of disrepair and some of them were being overhauled at the time of their capture.
- Kyrgyzstan
  - Kyrgyzstan Air and Air Defence Force
- Laos
  - Lao People's Liberation Army Air Force
- Madagascar
  - Malagasy Air Force
- Mongolia
  - Mongolian Air Force
- Namibia
  - Namibian Air Force
- Nigeria
  - Nigerian Air Force

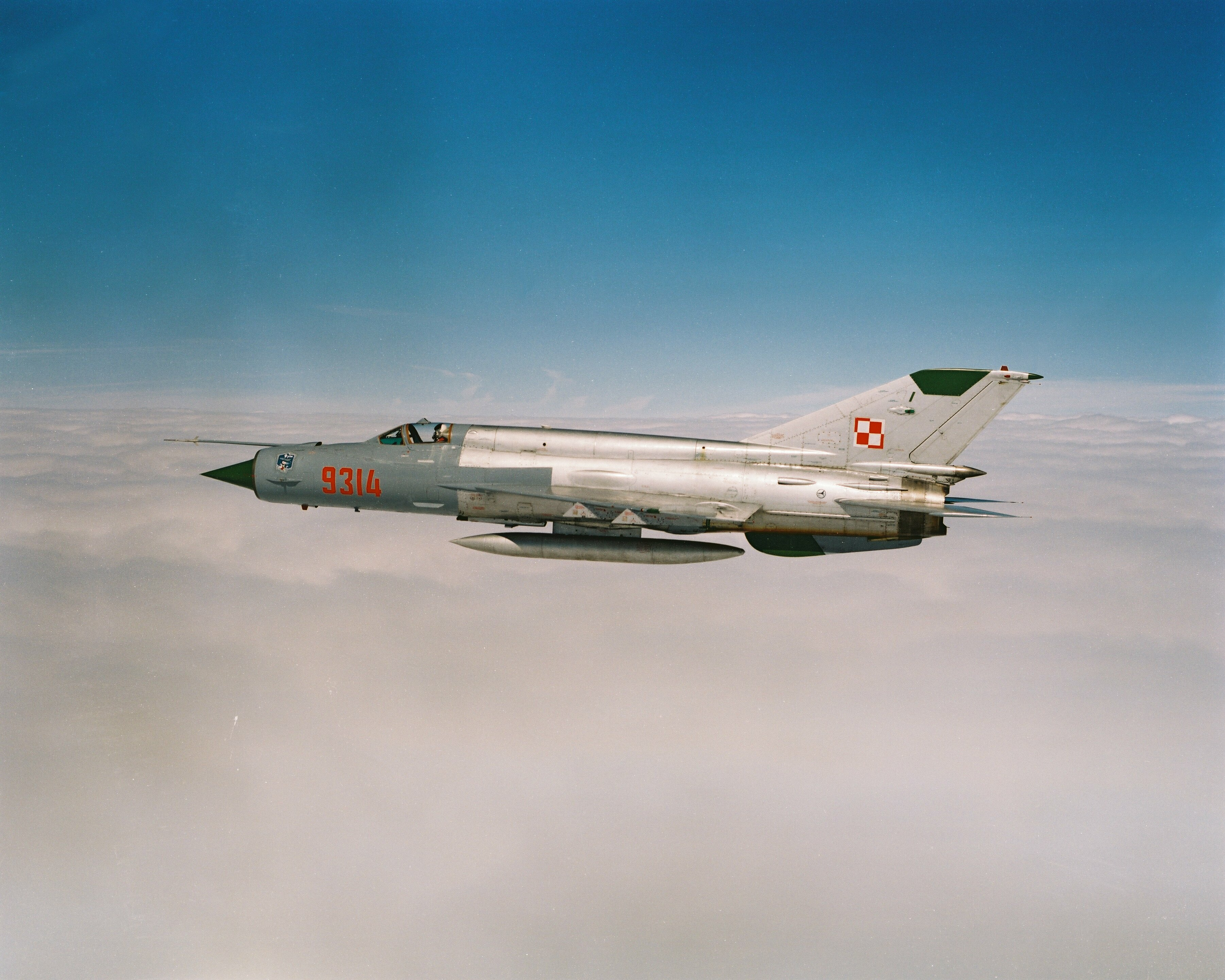
Polish Air Force MiG-21bis in 1999

- Poland
  - Polish Air Force
  - Polish Naval Aviation
- Romania
  - Romanian Air Force – officially retired on 15 May 2023
- Russia
  - Russian Air Force
- Serbia
  - Serbian Air Force and Air Defence – retired from service in May 2021.
- Serbia and Montenegro
  - Air Force of Serbia and Montenegro – passed on to Serbia.
- Slovakia
  - Slovak Air Force – in 1993, with the dissolution of Czechoslovakia, the Slovak Air Force obtained 13 MiG-21MAs, 36 MiG-21MFs, eight MiG-21Rs, two MiG-21USs and 11 MiG-21UMs. They were withdrawn in 2003. Some were put on display and placed in museums across the country; others were scrapped.
- Somalia
  - Somali Air Force
- Soviet Union – passed to successor states after the dissolution of the Soviet Union.
  - Soviet Air Force
  - Soviet Air Defence Force
  - Soviet Naval Aviation
- Sudan
  - Sudanese Air Force – 4 in service as of 2023.
- Syria
  - Syrian Arab Air Force – 50 in service as of 2024. The Syrian government of Al-Assad fell to rebels in late 2024, and the Syrian Arab Air Force was dismantled. It was re-established as Syrian Air Force, but the revolution, and the Israeli air strikes that followed it, wreaked havoc in the inventory of the Air Force. In late 2025, the World Air Forces publication by FlightGlobal, which tracks the aircraft inventories of world's air forces and publishes its counts annually, removed all Syrian Air Force's aircraft from their World Air Forces 2026 report. It is thus questionable if the Syrian Air Force has any flying aircraft in their inventory, and in particular, any MiG-21, as of December 2025.
- Tanzania
  - Tanzanian Air Force
- Turkmenistan
  - Turkmen Air Force
- Uganda
  - Ugandan Air Force
- United States
  - United States Air Force − retired after evaluation flights under "Have Doughnut" and aggressor squadron duty.
- Ukraine
  - Ukrainian Air Force
- Vietnam
  - Vietnam People's Air Force – retired from service in November 2015, put in temporary storage while the Air Force searches for a replacement, possibly the Sukhoi Su-35 or even the American F-16.
- Yemen
  - Yemeni Air Force - 19 in service as of 2023.
- Yugoslavia
  - Yugoslav Air Force – passed on to Serbia and Montenegro.
- Zaire – four were sold to the Zairean government by Yugoslavia but never flew.
- Zambia
  - Zambian Air Force

=== Civilian operators ===
According to the United States Federal Aviation Administration (FAA), there were 44 privately owned MiG-21s in the U.S. in 2012.

By 2013, Draken International had acquired 30 MiG-21bis/UM aircraft, mostly from Poland. In 2017, it operated 30 MiGs.

=== Use as suborbital space launch platform ===
In 2012, Premier Space Systems in Hillsboro, Oregon, US, conducted flight tests for NanoLaunch, a project to launch suborbital sounding rockets from MiG-21s flying over the Pacific Ocean. The company was dissolved in 2018.

== Aircraft on display ==
- MiG-21PF at the National Museum of the United States Air Force in Dayton, Ohio.
- MiG-21PF at the Commemorative Air Force Museum in Mesa, Arizona.
- MiG-21bis at the San Diego Air & Space Museum in San Diego, California.
- MiG-21F-13 at the Steven F. Udvar-Hazy Center in Chantilly, Virginia.
- The MiG-21F-13 that the German cosmonaut Sigmund Jähn also flew as a pilot in front of the exhibition building of the German Space Travel Exhibition in Morgenröthe-Rautenkranz in Saxony, Germany.
- MiG-21F-13 at Nellis Air Force Base in North Las Vegas, Nevada.
- MiG-21F at the Strategic Air Command & Aerospace Museum near Ashland, Nebraska.
- MiG-21MF at the National Air Force Museum of Canada in Trenton, Ontario, Canada.
- MiG-21 displayed on the rooftop of the NZ Seal Services building at Onehunga, Auckland, New Zealand.
- MiG-21R at the Mémorial de Caen in France.
- MiG-21R #94RO22213 originally from Polish Air Force on display at Maine Military Supply in Holden, Maine
- MiG-21MF at the Aviodrome in the Netherlands.
- MiG-21PF in central Bishkek, Kyrgyzstan.
- Thirteen MiG-21s of various variants at the Polish Aviation Museum in Kraków, Poland.
- MiG-21PFM at the Museum of Flight in Seattle, Washington.

At the Four Extreme Corners of India:

- Northernmost point, MiG-21M at the Kargil War Memorial, Dras.
- Southernmost point, MiG-21UM [U455] at C. V. Raman Park, Nagercoil.
- Easternmost point, MiG-21U [U453] at Sainik School, Imphal, Manipur.
- Westernmost point, MiG-21 Bison [CU2226] at Jaisalmer AFS

== Specifications (MiG-21bis) ==
Data from Jane's all the world's aircraft, 1992–93

General characteristics

- Crew: 1
- Length: 14.7 m (48 ft 3 in) excluding pitot boom
- Wingspan: 7.154 m (23 ft 6 in)
- Height: 4.1 m (13 ft 5 in)
- Wing area: 23 m^{2} (250 sq ft)
- Airfoil: root: TsAGI S-12 (4.2%); tip: TsAGI S-12 (5%)
- Gross weight: 8,725 kg (19,235 lb) with two R-3S missiles
- Max takeoff weight: 8,800 kg (19,401 lb) unprepared or metal planking runway

9,800 kg (21,605 lb) paved runway with standard wheels and tyres
10,400 kg (22,928 lb) paved runway with larger wheels and tyres

- Powerplant: 1 × Tumansky R-25-300 afterburning turbojet, 40.18 kN (9,030 lbf) thrust dry, 69.58 kN (15,640 lbf) with afterburner

Performance

- Maximum speed: 2,175 km/h (1,351 mph, 1,174 kn) / M2.05 at 13,000 m (43,000 ft)

1,300 km/h (810 mph; 700 kn) / M1.06 at sea level

- Landing speed: 250 km/h (160 mph; 130 kn)
- Range: 660 km (410 mi, 360 nmi) clean at 11,000 m (36,000 ft)

604 km (375 mi; 326 nmi) at 11,000 m (36,000 ft) with two R-3S missiles
793 km (493 mi; 428 nmi) at 10,000 m (33,000 ft) with two R-3S missiles and 800 L (210 US gal; 180 imp gal) drop-tank

- Service ceiling: 17,500 m (57,400 ft)
- Time to altitude: 17,000 m (56,000 ft) in 8 minutes 30 seconds
- Thrust/weight: 0.76
- Take-off run: 830 m (2,720 ft)
- Landing run with SPS and brake parachute: 550 m (1,800 ft)

Armament

- Guns: 1 × internal 23 mm Gryazev-Shipunov GSh-23L autocannon with 200 rounds
- Hardpoints: 5 (4 underwing + 1 ventral, reserved for fuel droptanks) , with provisions to carry combinations of:
  - Rockets: 4 × S-24 or 4× UB-16-57 rocket pods (4×16 57mm rockets)
  - Missiles:

- Air-to-air missiles:
  - K-13
  - R-55
  - R-60

  - Bombs: 2 × 500 kg (1,100 lb) and 2 × 250 kg bombs

== See also ==
- Operation Bolo – Part of the Vietnam War (1967)

Related development

- Mikoyan-Gurevich Ye-8
- Chengdu J-7

Aircraft of comparable role, configuration, and era

- Dassault Mirage III – (France)
- English Electric Lightning – (United Kingdom)
- Lockheed F-104 Starfighter – (United States)
- McDonnell Douglas F-4 Phantom II – (United States)
- Northrop F-5 – (United States)
- Saab 35 Draken – (Sweden)

Related lists

- List of Iranian aerial victories during the Iran–Iraq war
- List of Iraqi aerial victories during the Iran–Iraq war
- List of military aircraft of the Soviet Union and the CIS
- List of fighter aircraft
