= Action of 23 August 1967 =

Major air battle during the Vietnam War

- Part of Operation Rolling Thunder of the Vietnam War
Date	23 August 1967
Location	North Vietnam
Result	North Vietnamese victory

Belligerents
North Vietnam	United States

Commanders and leaders
Nguyễn Nhật Chiêu	Robin Olds

Strength
10 aircraft	52 aircraft

Casualties and losses
1 aircraft damaged	2 killed 3 captured 3 aircraft destroyed

The action of 23 August 1967 was a major air battle which involved elements of the Vietnam People's Air Force (VPAF) and the United States Air Force (USAF). The air battle took place over the skies of North Vietnam as part of Operation Rolling Thunder, during the Vietnam War.

On 2 January 1967, the United States Air Force launched Operation Bolo with the aim of luring North Vietnamese MiG fighters into an air battle, where they could be destroyed in an ambush. The operation, led by Colonel Robin Olds, turned out to be a major success after seven North Vietnamese MiG-21 fighters of the VPAF 921st Fighter Regiment were shot down.

Stung by that devastating defeat, the North Vietnamese Air Force grounded their fighter force several times between June and August 1967, in order to work on their training and tactics. On 23 August 1967, the North Vietnamese Air Force employed their newly devised tactic against a U.S. strike formation, while it was conducting raids against a rail yard. The air battle concluded with the USAF losing three F-4D fighters.

== Background ==
On 2 March 1965, the United States Government launched Operation Rolling Thunder, a major bombing campaign, with several objectives. Firstly, the operation was supposed to retaliate against North Vietnam for their military activities inside South Vietnam, thereby raising the morale of the South Vietnamese people, especially the Army of the Republic of Vietnam (ARVN). Secondly, it aimed to impede North Vietnam's ability to wage war by reducing, if not stopping, the flow of men and material into South Vietnam. Thirdly, the overall objective was to persuade the North Vietnamese Government to find a compromise through negotiations. Originally the U.S. Joint Chiefs of Staff submitted a list of 94 targets to be hit over a period of 16 days, but U.S. President Lyndon Johnson decided to include military targets in order to gradually apply pressure on the North Vietnamese Government, so the list of targets grew to 427 by the end of the campaign. In the first phase of the operation, which lasted from spring to summer of 1965, American airpower mainly targeted the North Vietnamese capital of Hanoi and its limited industrial base.

However, by the end of the year, the United States had failed to achieve the objectives of Rolling Thunder, because North Vietnam continued to send its troops and military supplies down the Ho Chi Minh Trail, which demonstrated that the North Vietnamese Government was not ready to quit the war. In response to domestic political pressure to do more, President Johnson shifted priority of the campaign to interdiction. From summer 1965 to the winter period of 1966–67, the campaign was aimed at degrading North Vietnam's capability to infiltrate and send men into South Vietnam. Again, America's shift towards interdiction also failed, and the Johnson administration was forced to change the priority of the bombing campaign. For the third phase of Rolling Thunder, which occurred from spring 1967 to early 1968, bombing operations were focused on industrial and transportation targets in and around Hanoi, Hai Phong and the buffer zone near the Chinese border.

The third phase of the campaign was heavily favored by U.S. commanders, because it allowed them to destroy rather than just threaten Hanoi's nascent industrial infrastructures. Furthermore, the new targets approved by the Johnson administration enabled U.S. airpower to be used against the primary war-making capabilities of North Vietnam, by striking at military targets that were previously denied to the fighter-bombers of the U.S. Navy and Air Force. Thus, in 1967 the United States also introduced more aircraft into the operation equipped with new technology, which gave American air units the assets to make a significant difference. However, as American bombers moved closer to Hanoi and Hai Phong, they were aggressively challenged by North Vietnamese MiG fighters.

== Prelude ==
The year of 1967 started badly for the Vietnam People's Air Force (VPAF). During the early years of the war, the rules of engagement prevented U.S. fighter-bombers from hitting North Vietnamese air bases, and that allowed North Vietnamese fighter pilots to attack American bomber formations as they were approaching their targets, thereby forcing U.S. pilots to jettison their bomb loads before they even reached their target. Then, instead of dueling with U.S. strike aircraft, North Vietnamese pilots would normally retreat to the safety of their bases. To preempt further attacks on U.S. bomber formations by the North Vietnamese Air Force, the United States Air Force became interested in luring North Vietnamese MiG fighters up against a decoy target, and shoot them down in the air using missile-armed fighter aircraft. By 1967, the North Vietnamese Air Force had become more aggressive towards U.S. strike formations, and it indicated to U.S. commanders that it was the right time to launch a decoy operation.

In what became known as Operation Bolo, the 8th Tactical Fighter Wing (8th TFW)—under the command of Colonel Robin Olds—based at Ubon in Thailand, was entrusted with the task of leading an operation which aimed to lure the North Vietnamese Air Force into an ambush. Accordingly, the F-4 Phantoms of the 8th TFW would fly in the same profile as an F-105 strike formation, by flying at the same time, altitudes, speed and routes. For the first time, the F-4 Phantoms would be equipped with the QRC-160 jamming pods so they would appear on North Vietnamese radars as F-105 bombers. To prepare for the operation, U.S. aircrews spent several days studying weapons envelopes, pod operation, and all aspects of air-to-air tactics. On 2 January 1967, a total of 56 F-4C Phantom II from the 8th and 366th Tactical Fighter Wings flew in a formation which resembled an F-105 strike force, towards the VPAF's Phuc Yen Air Base. There were four flights of F-104 fighters flying in escort, to simulate the F-4s.

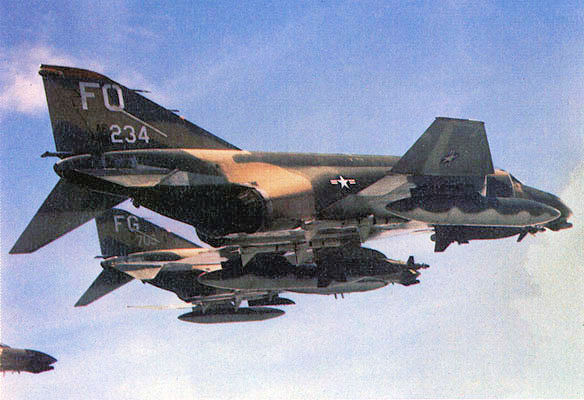
F-4D Phantoms of the 8th Tactical Fighter Wing played an active role in the air battles of 1967, including the action of 23 August.

When the U.S. fighter formations were detected by North Vietnamese radar, MiG-21 fighters of the VPAF 921st Fighter Regiment based at Phúc Yên Air Base and Kép Air Base were immediately placed on category one red alert, which was the highest state of alert. However, unknown to the U.S. pilots at the time, the VPAF High Command forbade their pilots from taking off until U.S. fighters were 40 kilometers (25 mi) away from Noi Bai. Apart from the late reaction of the VPAF High Command, weather conditions over North Vietnam also favored U.S. aircrews; North Vietnamese bases at Noi Bai and Kep were covered by 10/10th cloud, which started at a height of 1,500 meters (4,900 ft) and cleared at 3,000 meters (9,800 ft). By the time the first wave of North Vietnamese MiG fighters had taken off, two additional flights of F-4C fighters from the 8th TFW had already flown into the area undetected. Due to their lack of radar equipment, North Vietnamese MiG-17 fighters were restricted to flying at cloud base, so they failed to detect the presence of U.S. fighters that were flying at a higher altitude.

From above 10,000 meters (33,000 ft) U.S. F-4 fighters had a greater energy level over North Vietnamese MiG-17 and MiG-21 fighters, and U.S. pilots had no trouble seeing or identifying North Vietnamese fighters flying up from below. Furthermore, weather conditions on the day allowed radar and missile systems on the F-4 fighters to perform at their maximum level, an advantage which U.S. pilots fully exploited as North Vietnamese MiG fighters flew up to engage them. Just after 3:00 pm North Vietnamese MiG-21 fighters appeared through the clouds and began attacking U.S. fighters circling above. One by one the MiG-21 fighters were picked off by AIM-7 and AIM-9 missiles launched by U.S. pilots. The USAF suffered no losses and they claimed to have shot down seven MiG-21 fighters, but only five were confirmed by the North Vietnamese. All North Vietnamese pilots who were hit ejected safely, while the survivors managed to return to the safety of their home bases.

== Engagement ==
On 8 January 1967, the VPAF High Command convened a meeting to examine what had gone wrong. The actions of 2 January had exposed the flawed tactics employed by MiG-21 pilots; they broke through the clouds too quickly, and they did not join up with each other before they attacked the U.S. fighters waiting above them. The VPAF High Command then devised a new tactic which required the deployment of between two and four aircraft for each attack, with a maximum of ten aircraft for each mission to perform guerrilla-style attacks on U.S. bomber formations. Furthermore, after they had examined U.S. air tactics, North Vietnamese commanders decided that MiG-17 pilots should attack U.S. formations from either side, while MiG-21 pilots would strike from above. Before the North Vietnamese Air Force could implement their new tactics, however, the VPAF 921st Fighter Regiment was withdrawn from combat for several months to recover from the bloody defeat it had suffered as a result of Operation Bolo.

In April, North Vietnamese MiG fighters were back in the air to challenge U.S. Navy and Air Force fighter-bombers again, but they only experienced mixed results with heavy losses. As a result, between late June and early August 1967, North Vietnamese Air Force fighters were grounded several times, so their pilots could work on their training and new tactics. While the North Vietnamese pilots were undergoing training, American airpower was concentrated on striking at Hanoi's line of communications, especially the rail lines running north-east and north-west into China, and the transportation network which linked North Vietnam's capital with Hai Phong. To minimize the effects of U.S. strikes, North Vietnamese authorities constructed several alternate rail yards on the north-eastern train line, including the Yen Vien rail yard which located 58 kilometers (36 mi) north of Hanoi and ran through Thai Nguyen, and linked up with the main line at Kep close to China.

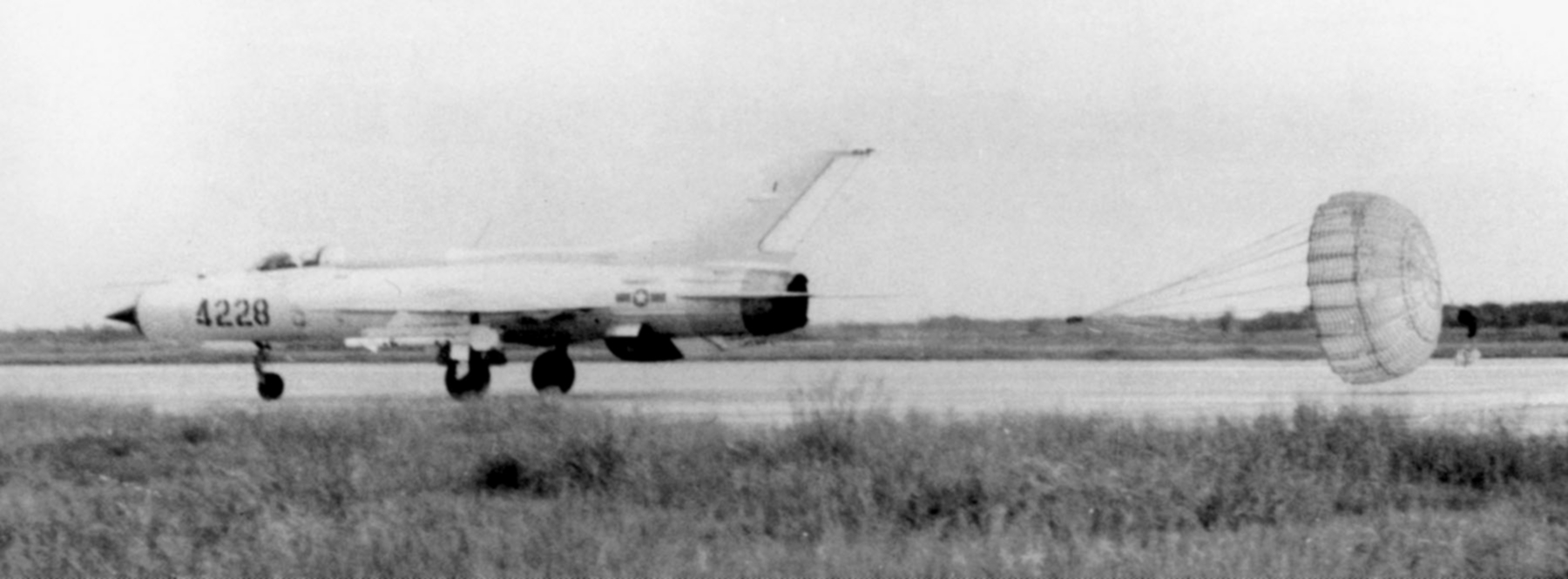
A missile-armed MiG-21PF of the VPAF 921st Fighter Regiment following a sortie

In response, the Seventh Air Force launched repeated strikes on the Yen Vien rail yard and other infrastructures which linked Hanoi with the China buffer zone. On 21 August 1967, a formation of twenty F-105 Thunderchiefs and eight F-4 Phantoms raided Yen Vien, which contained about 150 boxcars. The Americans claimed to have damaged more than half of the boxcars and trapped the remainder in the rail yard, so they returned two days later to destroy the rest. On the afternoon of 23 August 1967, a flight of sixteen F-4s from the 8th Tactical Fighter Wing escorted a formation of thirty-six F-105 strike aircraft from the 355th and 388th Tactical Fighter Wings based in Thailand, for the second attack on Yen Vien. The 555th Tactical Fighter Squadron provided two flights of F-4 Phantoms, 'Ford' flight and 'Falcon' flight. The mission was led by Colonel Nicholas J. Donelson with Olds, who spearheaded Operation Bolo back in January, as the leader of the escort formation. At 1:45 pm on 23 August, North Vietnamese radars detected a flight of 40 U.S. aircraft approaching Hanoi from Sam Neua, in neighboring Laos.

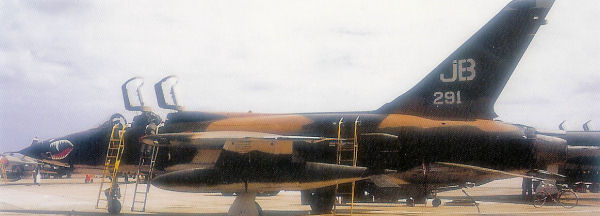
F-105 Thunderchiefs, of the 388th Tactical Fighter Wing, were headed for Yen Vien when the North Vietnamese Air Force attacked their formation.

The VPAF High Command immediately scrambled two flights of four MiG-17 fighters from the VPAF 923rd Fighter Regiment, followed by two MiG-21 fighters from the VPAF 921st Fighter Regiment at 2:51 pm. The MiG-21 force was led by Nguyen Nhat Chieu with Nguyen Van Coc, who had participated in the VPAF's disastrous mission during Operation Bolo, as the wingman. The first and second MiG-17 flights were commanded by Cao Thanh Tinh and Nguyen Van Tho respectively. Once airborne, North Vietnamese pilots maneuvered their aircraft into positions to deploy their new tactic which required the MiG-17 fighters to act as bait, while the MiG-21 fighters attacked from the rear. After Chieu and Coc had departed from Phuc Yen Air Base, they flew at low level and stayed in the ground clutter to avoid detection by airborne radars employed by U.S. aircraft. However, the MiG-21's transponders were detected by an orbiting EC-121 airborne early warning radar surveillance aircraft, and their positions were relayed to the F-4 fighters that were escorting the strike formation, but they did not respond.

Initially the first MiG-17 flight fell behind the U.S. strike formation, so Tinh and his formation climbed with full afterburner and they immediately played their part in the attack, by attacking the F-105 formation with their cannons. Meanwhile, as North Vietnamese ground controllers saw their fighter aircraft abeam the strike flight and outside the radar range of the F-4 formation, they ordered the MiG-21 fighters to climb up to 8,500 meters (27,900 ft). Chieu and Coc then dived out from an overcast and swept down on 'Ford' flight and the strike formation; Chieu fired a missile at an F-105 and Coc fired an R-3S Atoll missile which successfully destroyed 'Ford 4' (66-0238, 8th TFW), piloted by Major Charles R. Tyler. Shortly afterwards, Chieu turned his aircraft around and fired a missile at another F-4, but it missed. Coc also tried to score another kill, but he strayed into Chieu's line of fire as the latter was diving down from above firing his 23mm cannon.

As a result, Coc's MiG-21 was damaged but the controls were still working properly, so he requested to carry on with the mission. However, ground controllers ordered him to return to base, and the MiG-21 could only fly at a speed of 600 kilometers per hour (370 mph) due to the damage. After the U.S. strike formation had fallen into the ambush, MiG-17 pilots radioed their control center and requested to continue with their air patrol. Over the skies of Yen Vien, 'Ford 1' piloted by Captain Larry E. Carrigan (66-0247, 8th TFW) was shot down by a MiG-17 fighter from Tho's formation. Meanwhile, 'Falcon 3' (65-0726, 8th TFW) piloted by Major Robert R. Sawhill was shot down by anti-aircraft artillery. Against those losses, F-105 pilot First Lieutenant David B. Waldrop, 'Crossbow 3', claimed that he had destroyed one MiG-17 in the air battle. On the return trip, 'Ford 3' piloted by Major C.B. Demarque (66-0260) ran out of fuel as the aircraft tried to reach a tanker; the pilot and his Weapons Systems Officer were forced to eject from the aircraft as it malfunctioned over Thailand.

== Aftermath ==
The battle concluded as the worst day for the United States Air Force in Vietnam since 2 December 1966, when they had lost five aircraft over the skies of North Vietnam in a single day. Consequently, the actions of 23 August became known as "Black Wednesday" amongst U.S. pilots who participated in air operations over Hanoi on that particular day. The USAF officially confirmed the loss of three F-4D fighters during the raid against the Yen Vien rail yard, which resulted in the deaths of Weapon Systems Officers Captain Ronald N. Sittner (66-0238, 8th TFW) and First Lieutenant Charles Lane (66-00247, 8th TFW). Major Charles R. Tyler, Captain Larry E. Carrigan, Major Robert R. Sawhill and First Lieutenant Gerald L. Gerndt ejected safely from their aircraft, but they were captured alive and became prisoners of war. Major C.B. Demarque and his Weapons System Officer, First Lieutenant J.M. Piet were rescued shortly after they ejected from their malfunctioned aircraft over Thai airspace.

In contrast to their opponents, the action of 23 August gave the North Vietnamese Air Force their first major victory since Operation Bolo. The USAF's confirmation of the loss of 'Ford 4' to a MiG aircraft gave Nguyen Van Coc his second air-to-air victory, and he eventually became the leading ace pilot of the war with nine kills. Earlier in the engagement, flight leader Nguyen Nhat Chieu claimed to have destroyed an F-105 with a missile, but the USAF have not confirmed his claim. Nonetheless, Chieu also became a ranking ace pilot with six kills attributed to his name. The USAF also claimed one victory against a MiG-17 fighter, attributed to First Lieutenant David B. Waldrop, but the claim was not confirmed by the North Vietnamese because all their MiG fighters returned to base safely.

Following their defeat at the hands of the North Vietnamese Air Force, Colonel Robin Olds learned that Seventh Air Force intelligence had watched North Vietnamese MiG fighters practicing their new tactics for ten days prior to the battle of 23 August, but had not passed that information on to the 8th Tactical Fighter Wing and other units. Thus, it soon became clear to U.S. commanders that the reason the North Vietnamese repeatedly stood down their fighter force was because they were working on their new tactic. In the first half of 1967, the North Vietnamese had realized they could not directly confront U.S. fighters in air-to-air combat, so they changed their procedures for the deployment of their numerically inferior MiG units. To take advantage of the MiG-21's speed and small size, pilots flying the type were instructed to intercept targets only at high speed behind or above U.S. strike formations.

Then, as they approached their target, the MiG-21 pilots would make a supersonic diving pass against trailing or isolated flights, so they could position themselves for a missile kill. The action of 23 August demonstrated that the North Vietnamese Air Force had successfully executed their new procedure, which was helped by more skilful ground controllers who directed the MiG fighter towards their targets. Indeed, the new procedure gave North Vietnamese MiG pilots the ingredient they needed to achieve a kill over their U.S. opponents; between August 1967 and February 1968, the North Vietnamese Air Force achieved a kill ratio of 1.1:1 against the USAF, with the loss of 20 aircraft for 22 victories. In the same period of time, Operation Rolling Thunder had cost the United States approximately $900 million ($5,640 million at 2010 prices) with the loss of more than 700 aircraft. The bombing campaign continued until 31 October 1968, when it was abandoned by the U.S. Government.
