= Phạm Thanh Ngân =

Vietnamese fighter ace

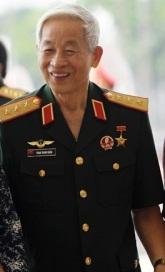

Chief of the General Political Department of the Vietnam People's Army
- In office 1998–2011
- Preceded by: Lê Khả Phiêu
- Succeeded by: Lê Văn Dũng

Personal details
- Born: 18 April 1939 (age 87) Phú Bình District, Thái Nguyên Province, Vietnam

Military service
- Allegiance: Vietnam
- Branch/service: Vietnam People's Army
- Years of service: 1959–2002
- Rank: Colonel General
- Commands: Vietnam People's Army
- Battles/wars: Vietnam War

Phạm Thanh Ngân (born 18 April 1939 in Phú Bình District in Thái Nguyên Province), is a former MiG-21 pilot of the Vietnamese People's Air Force. Phạm Thanh Ngân flew with the 921st Fighter Regiment and tied for second-most kills (with Nguyễn Hồng Nhị and Mai Văn Cường) amongst Vietnam War fighter aces at eight.

Phạm Thanh Ngân was admitted to the Communist Party of Vietnam on 8 December 1963 and became officially party member on 8 September 1964.

The following aerial-victories claims include the kills known to be credited to him by the VPAF:

- 14 December 1966, Ryan 147 Firebee/Lightning Bug drone;
- 16 September 1967, a US Air Force RF-101C Voodoo (serial number 56-0180, 20th Tactical Reconnaissance Squadron/432nd TRW; pilot Bagley, POW);
- 3 October 1967, a USAF F-4D Phantom II (pilot Moore/WSO Gulbrandson, both rescued; a shared kill with Nguyễn Ngọc Độ);
- 7 October 1967, a USAF F-4D Phantom II (pilot Appleby, POW/WSO Austin, KIA, US-side claims SAM);
- 18 November 1967, a USAF F-105F Wild Weasel (pilot Dardeau, POW/EWO Lehnhoff, KIA);
- 20 November 1967, a USAF F-105D Thunderchief (pilot Butler, POW);
- 3 February 1968, a USAF F-102A Delta Dagger (pilot Wiggins, KIA).

== See also ==
- List of Vietnam War flying aces
- Weapons of the Vietnam War
