= Richard Stephen Ritchie =

United States general (born 1942)

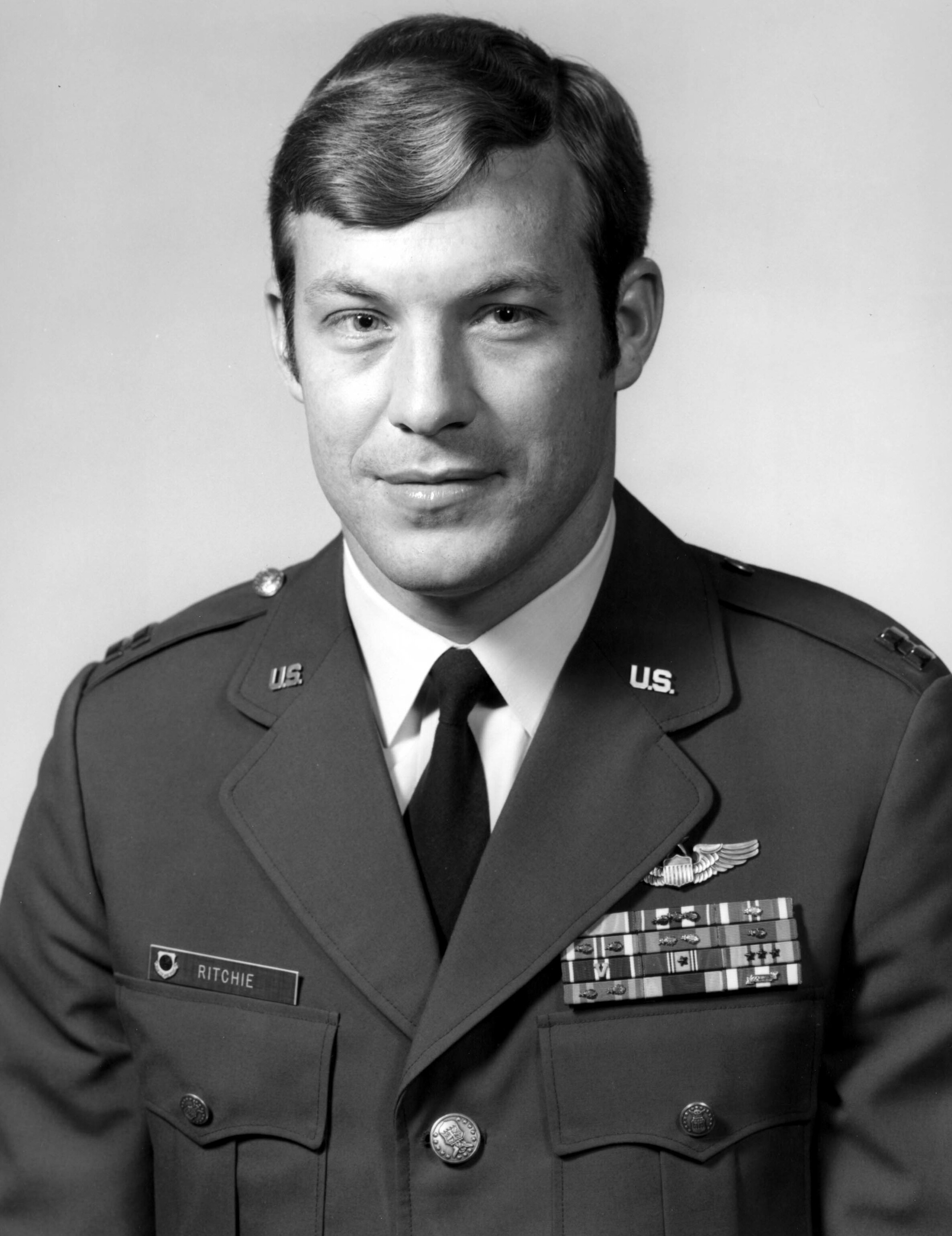
- Ritchie, circa 1973
- Born: June 25, 1942 (age 84); Reidsville, North Carolina, U.S.
- Military career
- Allegiance: United States of America
- Branch: United States Air Force; Colorado Air National Guard
- Service years: 1964–1999
- Rank: Brigadier General
- Nickname: Steve
- Conflicts: Vietnam War
- Awards: Air Force Cross; Air Force Distinguished Service Medal; Silver Star (4); Distinguished Flying Cross (10); Meritorious Service Medal; Air Medal (25); Mackay Trophy; Jabara Award
- Other work: Congressional candidate motivational speaker

Brigadier General Richard Stephen Ritchie (born June 25, 1942) served as an officer in the United States Air Force and the Colorado Air National Guard, and a general officer in the Air Force Reserve. Ritchie joined Navy Commander Randy Cunningham as the only two pilots (along with three airborne weapon systems officers) among the five American aces during the Vietnam War. Ritchie is a recipient of the Air Force Cross, the second highest military decoration that can be awarded to a member of the United States Air Force. Additionally, he is the 30th most decorated service member in United States history.

== Early life ==
Ritchie was born June 25, 1942, in Reidsville, North Carolina, the son of an American Tobacco Company executive. He was a star quarterback for Reidsville High School, despite breaking his leg twice, and graduated in 1960. In 1964, he graduated with a Bachelor of Science degree in Engineering Science from the United States Air Force Academy, where, as a "walk-on", he became the starting halfback for the Falcons varsity football team in 1962 and 1963, playing his final game in the 1963 Gator Bowl.

Ritchie was described by his peers as being a jock, and by General Robin Olds, who admired him greatly, as being "brilliant" but thinking himself "God's gift" (cocky and egotistical). According to one of the intelligence officers of the 555th Tactical Fighter Squadron, Ritchie was often lacking in self-discipline, with a personal trademark of using too much Old Spice cologne. (Ritchie's retort was that the pilots' locker room was too odoriferous.)

His colleagues viewed him as being hard-working and disciplined.

== Vietnam ==
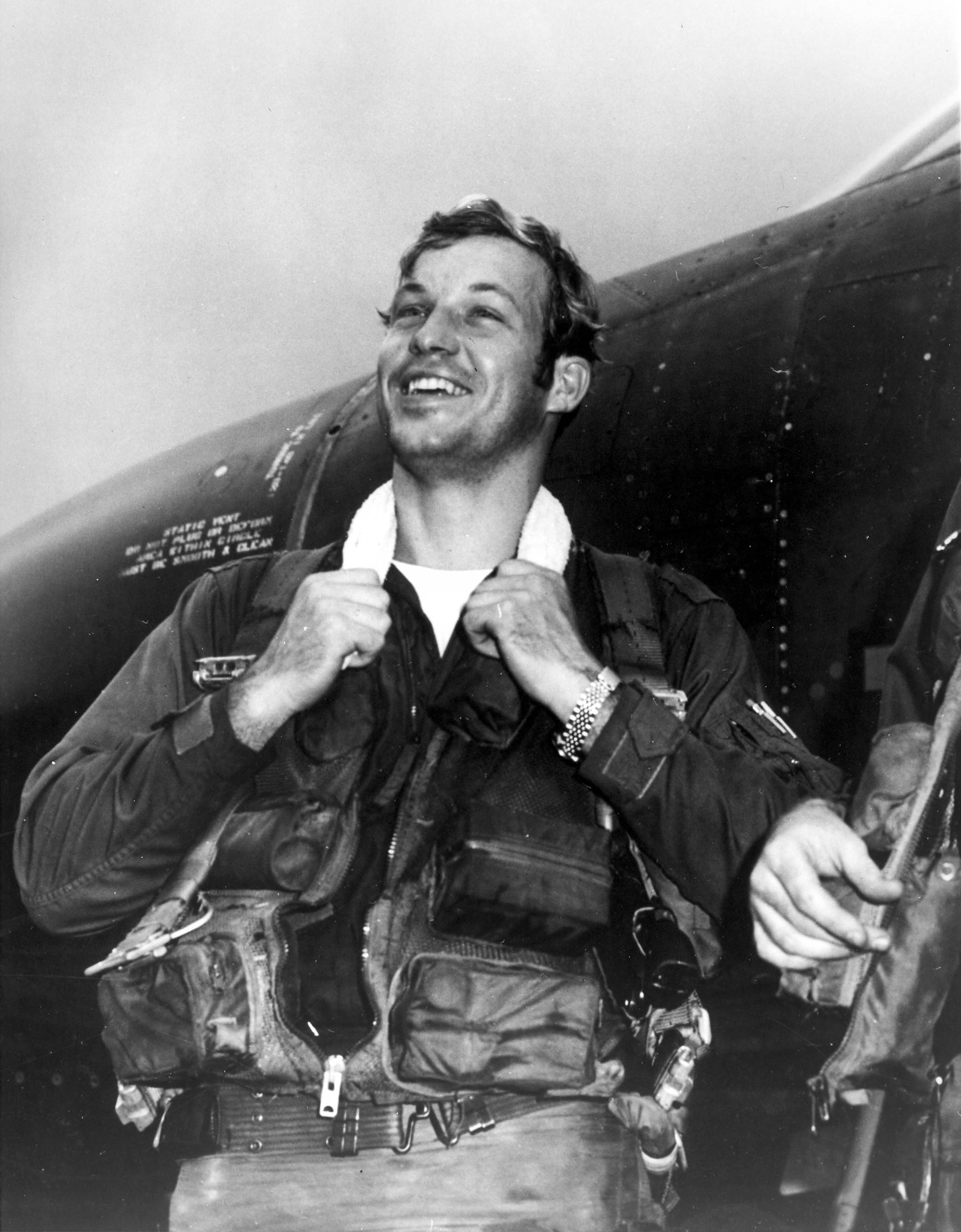
Capt. Steve Ritchie, 555th Tactical Fighter Squadron, pictured beside the aircraft in which he became the first Air Force ace of the Vietnam War

Following his graduation from the U.S. Air Force Academy, Ritchie was commissioned a Second Lieutenant in the U.S. Air Force. In August 1964, he entered Undergraduate Pilot Training (UPT) at Laredo Air Force Base, Texas, and finished first in his class in 1965. His first operational assignment was with Flight Test Operations at Eglin Air Force Base, Florida, where he flew the F-104 Starfighter (he was one of the few Second Lieutenants selected to fly it). Two years later he transitioned into the F-4 Phantom II at Homestead Air Force Base, Florida, in preparation for his first tour in Southeast Asia.

Assigned to the 480th Tactical Fighter Squadron, 366th Tactical Fighter Wing at Da Nang Air Base, South Vietnam in 1968, Ritchie flew the first "Fast FAC" mission in the F-4 forward air controller program, and he completed 195 combat missions.

In 1969, he was selected to attend the Fighter Weapons Course at Nellis Air Force Base, Nevada, becoming, up to that point, the Air Force Fighter Weapons School's youngest-ever instructor at age 26. He taught air-to-air tactics from 1970 to 1972 to the best USAF pilots, including Major Robert Lodge, who later became his flight leader in Thailand and himself shot down three MiGs.

Ritchie volunteered for a second combat tour in 1972 and was assigned to the 432nd Tactical Reconnaissance Wing at Udorn Royal Thai Air Force Base, Thailand. Flying F-4s with the famed 555th ("Triple Nickel") Tactical Fighter Squadron he shot down his first Mikoyan-Gurevich MiG-21 on 10 May 1972, scored a second victory on May 31, a third and fourth on July 8, and a fifth on August 28. All of the aircraft he shot down were MiG-21s, and all were shot down by the much-maligned AIM-7 Sparrow radar-guided air-to-air missile. Ritchie became the USAF's first and only pilot ace of the Vietnam War.

An advantage that the Triple Nickel pilots had over other US aircrews was that eight of their F-4Ds had the top secret APX-80 electronic set installed, known by its code-name Combat Tree. Combat Tree could read the IFF signals of the transponders built into the MiGs so that North Vietnamese GCI radar could discriminate its aircraft from that of the Americans. Displayed on a scope in the WSO's cockpit, Combat Tree gave the Phantoms the ability to identify and locate MiGs when they were still beyond visual range.

=== May 1972, kills 1 and 2 ===
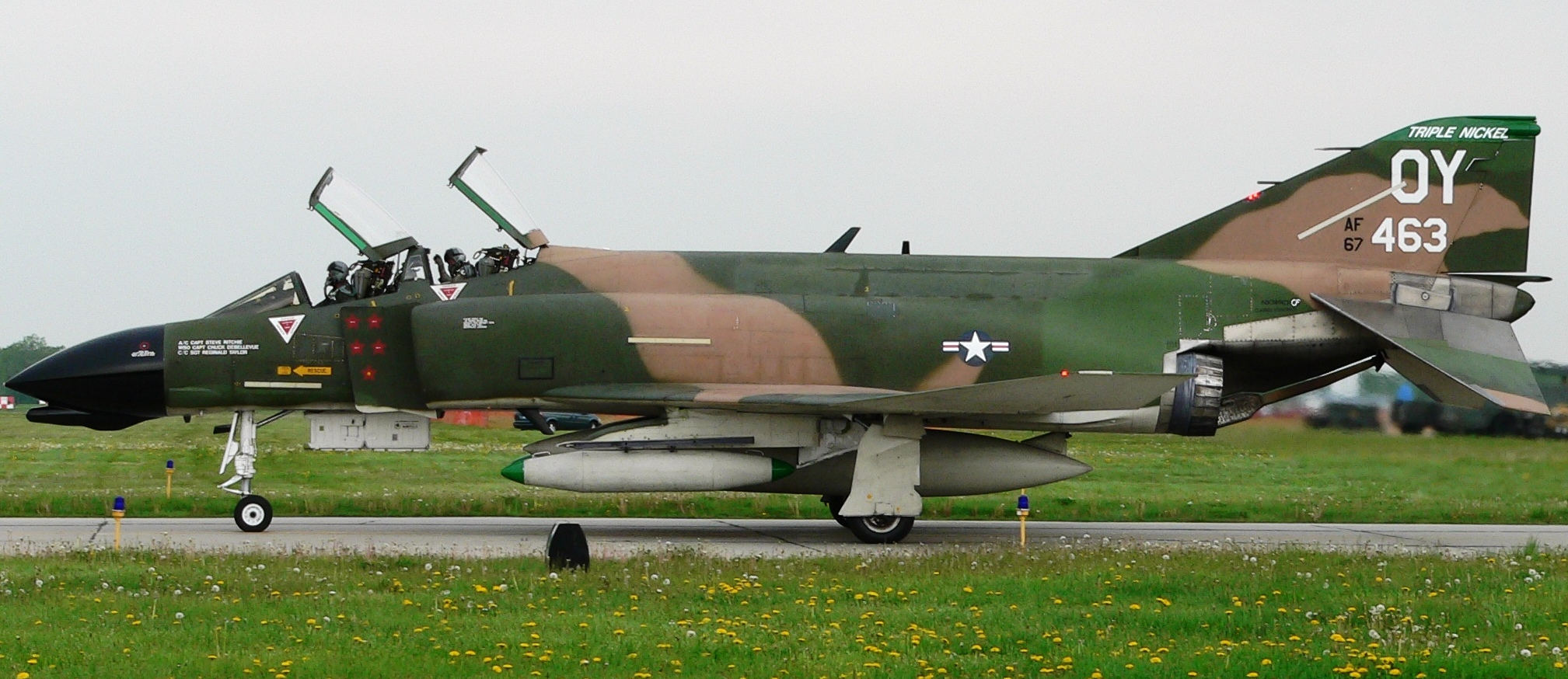
Collings Foundation F-4D Phantom II marked as 555TFS 66–7463, flown by Ritchie for 1st and 5th kills

Ritchie's assignment on May 10, the first major day of air combat in Operation Linebacker, was as element leader (Oyster 3) of one of two flights of the F-4D MiGCap for the morning strike force. Oyster flight had three of its Phantoms equipped with Combat Tree IFF interrogators, and two days previously its flight lead, Major Robert Lodge, and his WSO Capt. Roger Locher had scored their second MiG kill to lead all USAF crews then flying in Southeast Asia.

At 09:42, forewarned 19 minutes earlier by the EC-121 "Disco" over Laos and then by "Red Crown", the US Navy radar picket ship, the guided missile cruiser USS Chicago, Oyster flight engaged an equal number of MiG-21s head-on, scattering them. Oyster flight shot down three and nearly got the fourth, but fell victim to a MiG tactic dubbed "Kuban tactics" after those of the Soviet World War II ace Pokryshkin, in which a GCI-controlled flight of MiG-19s trailed so that they could be steered behind the American fighters maneuvering to attack the MiG-21s. Lodge was shot down and killed, despite clumsy flying by the MiG-19's. (He might have been able to eject, but had previously told his flightmates that he would not be captured because of his extensive knowledge of classified and sensitive information.) Almost simultaneously Ritchie and Capt Chuck DeBellevue, his WSO, rolled into a firing position behind the remaining MiG-21 of the original 4 with a radar lock, launched two Sparrows and scored a kill with the second.

On May 31, Ritchie's second kill involved a tactical ruse in which the MiGCAP flights used the radio call signs of another wing's chaff-deploying flights on a mission northeast of Hanoi. The fighters crossed into North Vietnam from over the Gulf of Tonkin north of Haiphong, and were warned by Red Crown of MiG-21s 40 miles (64 km) southwest of their position and headed towards them. Red Crown continued to call warnings, and when the MiGs were within 15 miles (24 km) and to their rear, Ritchie began a descending turn towards them. He observed them above him to his left front and continued his left turn until he was behind and below the trailing MiG. His WSO, Capt. Lawrence Pettit, acquired a "full-system lock-on" and Ritchie ripple-fired all four AIM-7s the aircraft was carrying. The first went out of control to the right, the next two detonated early, but the last one struck the MiG in the cockpit and split its fuselage in two.

=== July 1972, kills 3 and 4 ===
MiG killers of the 432nd TRW, 11 August 1972. (L–R) Front: Capt DeBellevue and Capt Ritchie Rear: Lt Col Carl "Griff" Baily and Capt Jeffrey S. Feinstein

USAF strike and chaff forces suffered a severe series of losses to MiGs between June 24 and July 5 (7 F-4s) without killing a MiG in return. As a counter-measure, Seventh Air Force added a second Disco EC-121 to its airborne radar coverage, positioning it over the Gulf of Tonkin.

On July 8 Ritchie and DeBellevue were leading "Paula" flight, in gun-equipped F-4Es instead of the Combat Tree F-4Ds they usually flew, on a MiGCAP to cover the exit of the strike force. While they were west of Phu Tho and south of Yen Bai, the EC-121 vectored them to intercept MiG-21s returning to base after damaging one of the US chaff escorts. The MiGs were still approximately 4 miles (6.4 km) away and Ritchie turned the flight south to cross the Black River. As they closed, Disco gave them warning that the MiG return had "merged" with the Paula flight's return on his screen. Ritchie reversed course, observed the first MiG at his 10 o'clock position and turned left to meet it head-on.

When Ritchie passed the first MiG-21, he recalled the engagement of May 10 and waited to see if there was a trailing MiG. When he observed the second MiG, which he also passed head-on, he reversed hard left to engage. The MiG turned to its right to evade the attack, an unusual maneuver, and Ritchie used a vertical separation move to gain position on its rear quarter. DeBellevue obtained a solid boresight (dogfighting radar lock) on it while at the MiG's 5 o'clock; although fired from the edge of their flight envelopes, both AIM-7s struck home.

The first MiG had also turned back and was attacking the last F-4 in Ritchie's flight from behind, an often fatal consequence to US aircraft employing the then-standard "fluid four" tactical formation. Ritchie made a hard turn across the curving intercept of the MiG, again coming out at its 5 o'clock, and the MiG, apparently perceiving the threat, broke hard right and dove away. Ritchie fired an AIM-7 from inside its minimum range and at the limit of its capability to turn. Expecting the Sparrow to miss, he was trying to switch to a gun attack in the relatively unfamiliar F-4E he was flying that day when the missile exploded the MiG, 1 minute and 29 seconds after the first kill.

A competition to become the Air Force's first Vietnam ace developed between Ritchie and Captain Jeffrey S. Feinstein of another of the 432nd's squadrons, the 13th TFS, who scored his 3rd and 4th kills on July 18 and July 29. Each had a claim denied by Seventh Air Force's Enemy Aircraft Claims Evaluation Board, Ritchie and DeBellevue for a claim of a MiG-21 on June 13, and Feinstein for a claim June 9.

=== Fifth kill ===
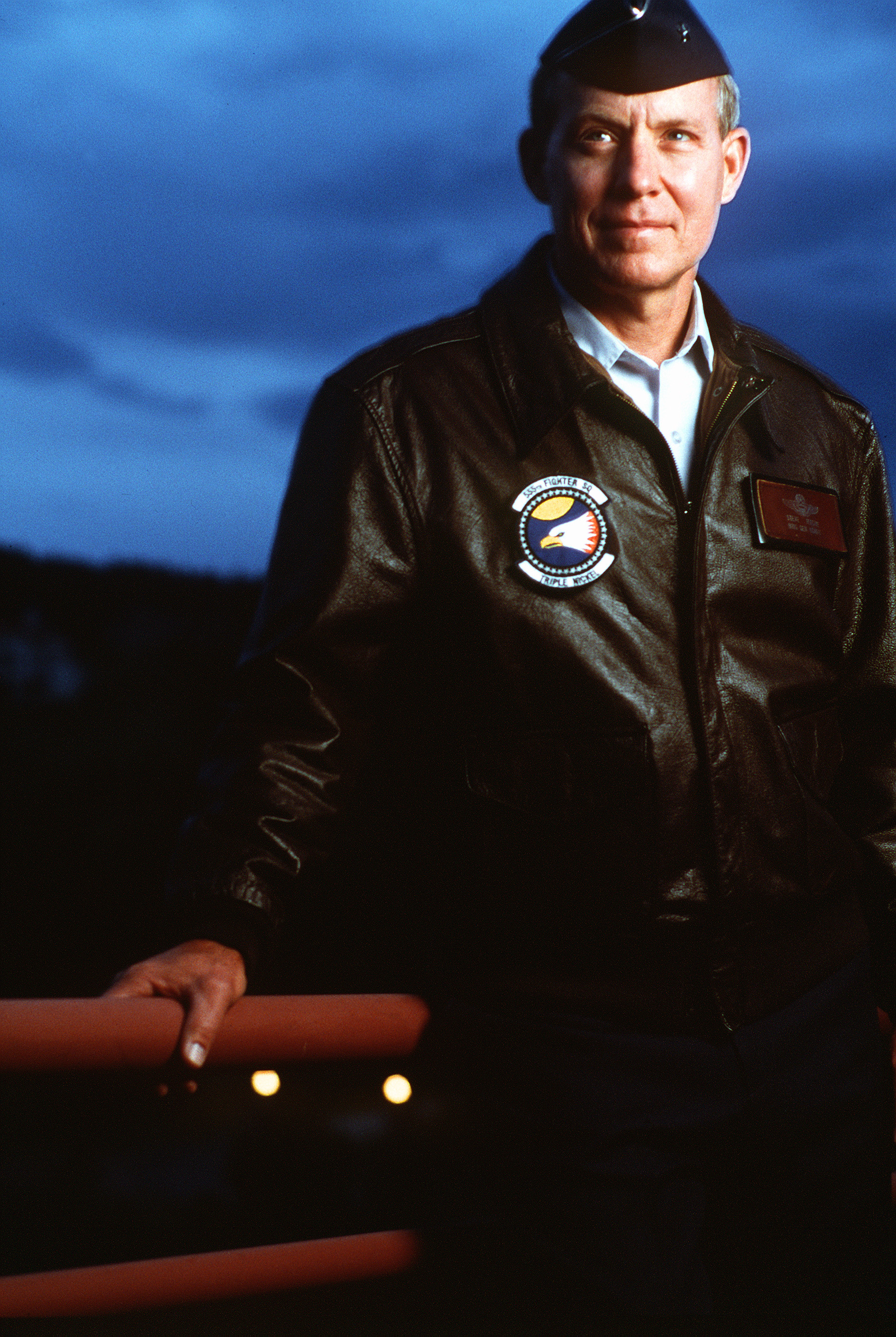
Brig. Gen. Steve Ritchie, dressed in an A-2 leather flight jacket, poses for an informal portrait prior to September 1996

Ritchie's final victory came August 28, 1972, while leading "Buick" flight, a MiGCAP for a strike north of Hanoi. During the preceding month Seventh Air Force had instituted daily centralized mission debriefings of leaders and planners from all fighter wings called "Linebacker Conferences." Ritchie had just started his flight of Combat Tree Phantoms on its return to base (Ritchie was flying the F-4D, AF Ser. No. 66-7463, in which he had scored his first kill). Red Crown, now the nuclear-powered guided missile cruiser USS Long Beach, alerted the strike force to "Blue Bandits" (MiG-21s) 30 miles (48 km) southwest of Hanoi, along the route back to Thailand. Approaching the area of the reported contact at 15,000 feet (4,600 m), Ritchie recalled recent Linebacker Conference information that MiGs had returned to using high altitude tactics and suspected the MiGs were high. Buick and Vega flights, both of the MiGCAP, flew toward the reported location.

DeBellevue picked up the MiGs on the Phantom's onboard radar and using Combat Tree, discovered that the MiGs were 10 miles (16 km) behind Olds flight, another flight of MiGCAP fighters returning to base. Ritchie called in the contact to warn Olds flight. Ritchie, concerned that MiGs might be at an altitude above them, made continuous requests for altitude readings to both Disco and Red Crown. He received location, heading, and speed data on the MiGs (now determined to be returning north at high speed to their base) but not altitude as Buick flight closed to within 15 miles (24 km) of the MiGs. DeBellevue's radar then painted the MiGs dead ahead at 25,000 feet (7,600 m), and Ritchie ordered the flight to light afterburners. DeBellevue warned Ritchie they were closing fast and were in range. About the same time Ritchie saw the MiGs himself headed in the opposite direction.

Attacking in a climbing curve behind the MiG-21's with his AIM-7 guidance radar locked on, Ritchie was given continuous range updates by DeBellevue. With his Phantom barely making enough speed to overtake the targets, Ritchie launched two Sparrows from over 4 miles (6.4 km) away. The firing parameters of the two shots were out of the missiles' performance envelope, an attempt to influence the MiGs to turn and thus shorten the range. Both shots not only missed but failed to influence the opponents. Moments later, tracking one MiG visually by the contrail it was making, Ritchie fired his remaining two Sparrows, also at long range. The first missed, but the MiG made a hard turn and actually shortened the range, and was destroyed by the second. Short on fuel, Ritchie elected not to try to pursue the second MiG-21.

Ritchie commented:

My fifth MiG kill was an exact duplicate of a syllabus mission (at Fighter Weapons School), so I had not only flown that as a student, but had taught it probably a dozen times prior to actually doing it in combat.

=== Aerial victory credits ===
Date (1972)	Pilot	Weapons Systems Officer	Aircraft	Tail Code	Call Sign	Wpn	Type
May 10	Capt. Richard S. Ritchie	Capt. Charles B. DeBellevue	F-4D 66-7463	OY	Oyster 03	AIM-7	MiG-21
May 31	Capt. R.S. Ritchie	Capt. Lawrence H. Pettit	F-4D 65-0801	OY	Icebag 01	AIM-7	MiG-21
July 8	Capt. R.S. Ritchie	Capt. C.B. DeBellevue	F-4E 67-0362	ED	Paula 01	AIM-7	MiG-21
July 8	Capt. R.S. Ritchie	Capt. C.B. DeBellevue	F-4E 67-0362	ED	Paula 01	AIM-7	MiG-21
August 28	Capt. R.S. Ritchie	Capt. C.B. DeBellevue	F-4D 66-7463	OY	Buick 01	AIM-7	MiG-21

SOURCE: United States Air Force in Southeast Asia: Aces and Aerial Victories – 1965–1973 on-line edition

== Post-Vietnam War ==
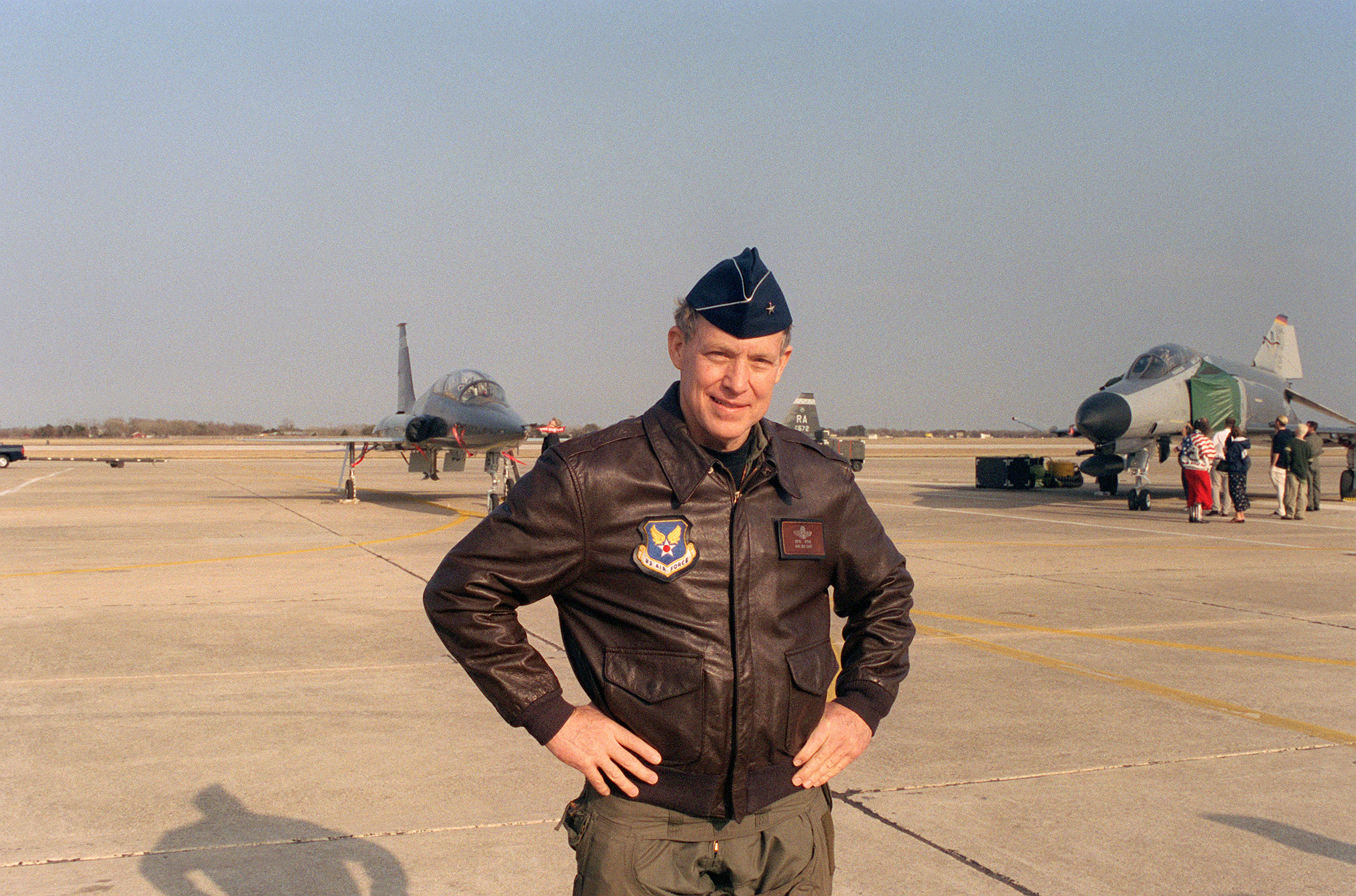
Brigadier General Steve Ritchie prior to his last career flight

After completing 339 combat missions totaling over 800 flying hours, Ritchie returned from his second combat tour as one of the most highly decorated pilots in the Vietnam War. His combat achievements earned him the 1972 Mackay Trophy for the most significant Air Force mission of the Year, the Air Force Academy's 1972 Jabara Award for airmanship, and the 1972 Armed Forces Award, presented by the Veterans of Foreign Wars for outstanding contributions to the national security of the United States.

Ritchie logged over 4,000 flying hours in his Air Force career. He retired from the Air Force in 1999.

Ritchie wrote in a Wall Street Journal editorial that:

The first time I ever saw an unlike airplane was a MiG-21 near Hanoi. In those days, we weren't allowed to train against dissimilar aircraft. They wouldn't let us train the way we were going to fight. Sometimes, I wasn't even allowed to fire back if fired upon.

A political conservative, Ritchie opted to leave active duty following Vietnam, in 1974, joining the Air National Guard and running for Congress from North Carolina at the urging of U.S. Senator Barry Goldwater. However, he lost in the wake of the Watergate Scandal, during which time Republican party newcomers were challenged to get elected. He held various executive positions in private life, including six years at the Adolph Coors Company (now Coors Brewing Company) and The Heritage Foundation, where he was special assistant to Joseph Coors.

He joined the Colorado Air National Guard and continued his military duty in a flying status while pursuing his civilian career, later transferring to the Air Force Reserve. In 1985, he was appointed director of the Office of Child Support Enforcement, reporting to the Secretary of Health and Human Services. In 1987, he was assigned to the Mobilization Policy and Plans Directorate at the Office of the Secretary of Defense.

Promoted to brigadier general in the Air Force Reserve in 1994, he became the mobilization assistant to the commander of Air Force Recruiting Service. For six years, he traveled across the United States, speaking to approximately 1,100 audiences in support of Air Force recruiting efforts. He also flew more than 100 air show performances in the T-38 Talon. He retired in January 1999, after flying in his last air show at Randolph Air Force Base, Texas.

He lives in Colorado Springs, Colorado working as a motivational speaker, and periodically flies demilitarized civilian F-104 Starfighters on the American air show circuit for "Starfighters International" based in Florida. His wife Marianna was an immigrant from the Socialist Republic of Romania.

In 2015, along with other American Aces, he was awarded a Congressional Gold Medal.

== Awards and decorations ==
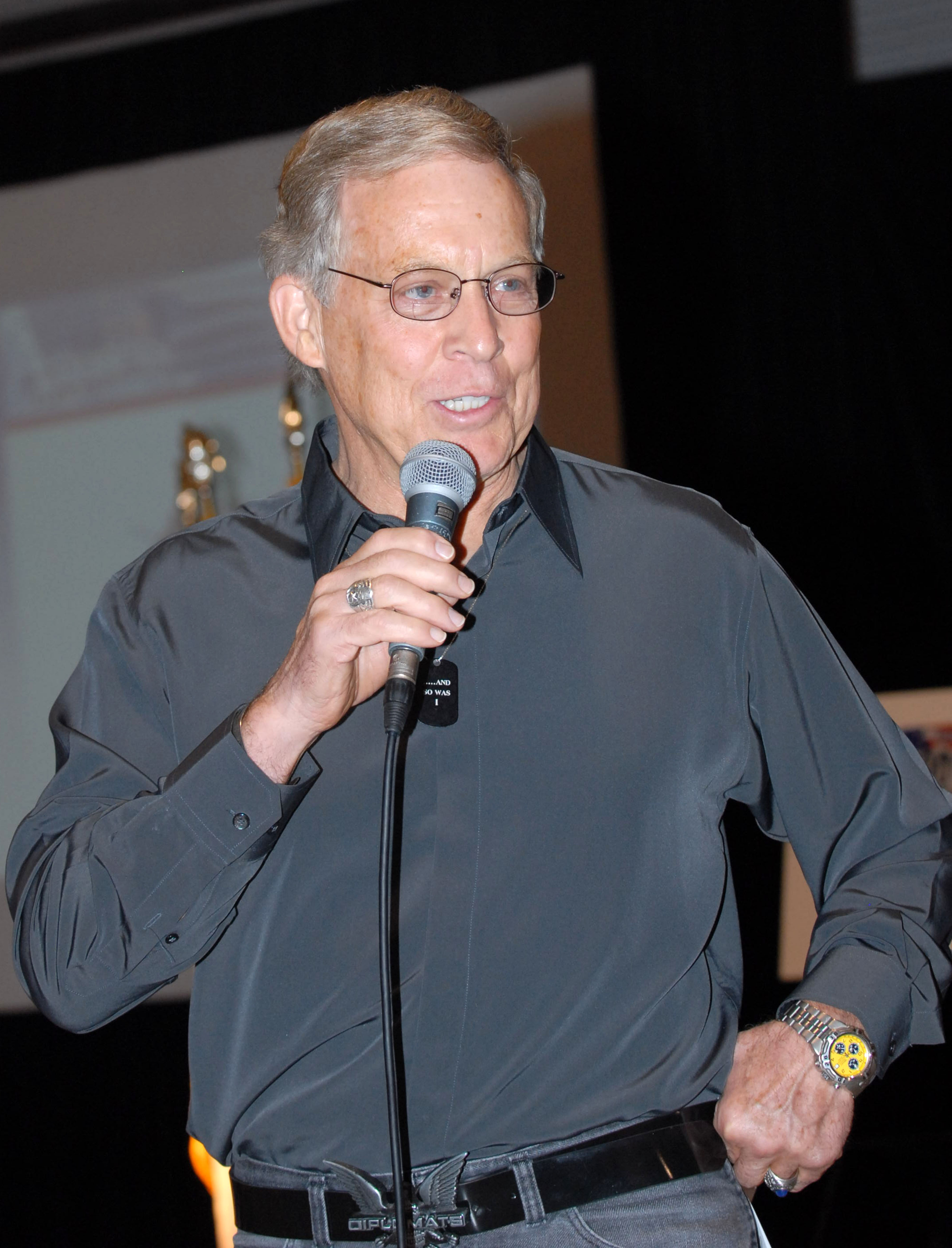
Ritchie in August 2007

United States Air Force Command Pilot Badge
Air Force Cross		Air Force Distinguished Service Medal
Silver Star w/ 3 bronze oak leaf clusters	Distinguished Flying Cross w/ Valor device, 1 silver and 2 bronze oak leaf clusters	Distinguished Flying Cross w/ 1 bronze oak leaf cluster (second ribbon required for accouterment spacing)
Meritorious Service Medal	Air Medal w/ 4 silver oak leaf clusters	Air Medal w/ 3 bronze oak leaf clusters (second ribbon required for accouterment spacing)
Air Force Commendation Medal	Air Force Outstanding Unit Award w/ Valor device	National Defense Service Medal w/ 1 bronze service star
Vietnam Service Medal w/ 1 silver and 1 bronze campaign stars	Air Force Overseas Short Tour Service Ribbon w/ 1 bronze oak leaf cluster	Air Force Longevity Service Award w/ 2 bronze oak leaf clusters
Armed Forces Reserve Medal w/ silver hourglass device	Small Arms Expert Marksmanship Ribbon	Air Force Training Ribbon
Vietnam Air Gallantry Cross	Vietnam Gallantry Cross	Republic of Vietnam Campaign Medal

=== Air Force Cross ===

Ritchie, Richard Stephen
Captain, U.S Air Force
555th Tactical Fighter Squadron, 8th Tactical Fighter Wing, Udorn Royal Thai Air Force Base, Thailand
Date of Action: August 28, 1972

Citation:

The President of the United States of America, authorized by Title 10, Section 8742, United States Code, takes pleasure in presenting the Air Force Cross to Captain Richard Stephen Ritchie, United States Air Force, for extraordinary heroism in military operations against an opposing armed force as an F-4D Aircraft Commander, 555th Tactical Fighter Squadron, Udorn Royal Thai Air Force Base, Thailand, in action on 28 August 1972. On that date, while leading his flight to its assigned position deep in hostile territory, Captain Ritchie engaged and destroyed a hostile aircraft while it was attempting an attack on another flight of allied aircraft. Through superior maneuvering and use of aircraft capabilities, and in complete disregard for his own safety, Captain Ritchie was successful in destroying his fifth North Vietnamese MiG-21. Through his extraordinary heroism, superb airmanship, and aggressiveness in the face of the enemy, Captain Ritchie reflected the highest credit upon himself and the United States Air Force.
