= Lê Thanh Đạo =

Lê Thanh Đạo (born 1944) is a former MiG-21 pilot of the Vietnamese People's Air Force. He flew with the 921st and 927th fighter regiment and tied for fourth place amongst Vietnam War fighter aces with six kills.

"We took off from Noi Bai Airbase ascending to an altitude of 3,500m toward Ba Vi... we discovered the enemy Phantoms and intercepted two aircraft in a pair, and I prepared to launch my missile, when another F-4 hit my MiG-21 and I had to eject immediately. While I was descending, a Phantom fired a burst from their cannon which made many holes in my parachute... I had fallen and crashed into a big rock at high speed. I was unconscious for two days; both legs and vertebra were broken... locals made a stretcher from my parachute and transported me a distance of 9km where an Mi-6 helicopter brought me to Hospital No. 108 where I stayed for 4 months... I was only able to return to flight duty after a year."

— Le Thanh Dao, VPAF MiG-21 pilot, describing his final engagement with F-4 Phantoms on October 15, 1972, MiG Aces of the Vietnam War, Toperczer, Istvan, 2015, Library of Congress # 2015932137, Page 214

The following victories include the kills that are known to be credited to him by the VPAF:

- 18 December 1971, a USAF F-4D (serial number 06-241, 555th Tactical Fighter Wing, pilot Johnson, WSO Vaughan, POWs);
- 10 May 1972, a USN F-4J (pilot Blackburn (MIA-KIA), RIO Rudloff (POW), US claims AAA);
- 12 June 1972, an F-4 Phantom (US does not confirm);
- 24 July 1972, an F-4 Phantom (US does not confirm);
- 24 July 1972, Firebee (shared);
- 9 September 1972, an F-4 Phantom (US does not confirm);
- 11 September 1972, a USAF F-4E (pilot Ratzlaff, WSO Heeren, POWs);
- 1 October 1972, an F-4 Phantom (US does not confirm).

== See also ==
- List of Vietnam War flying aces
- Weapons of the Vietnam War
