= Nguyễn Tiến Sâm =

North Vietnamese fighter ace (1946–2019)

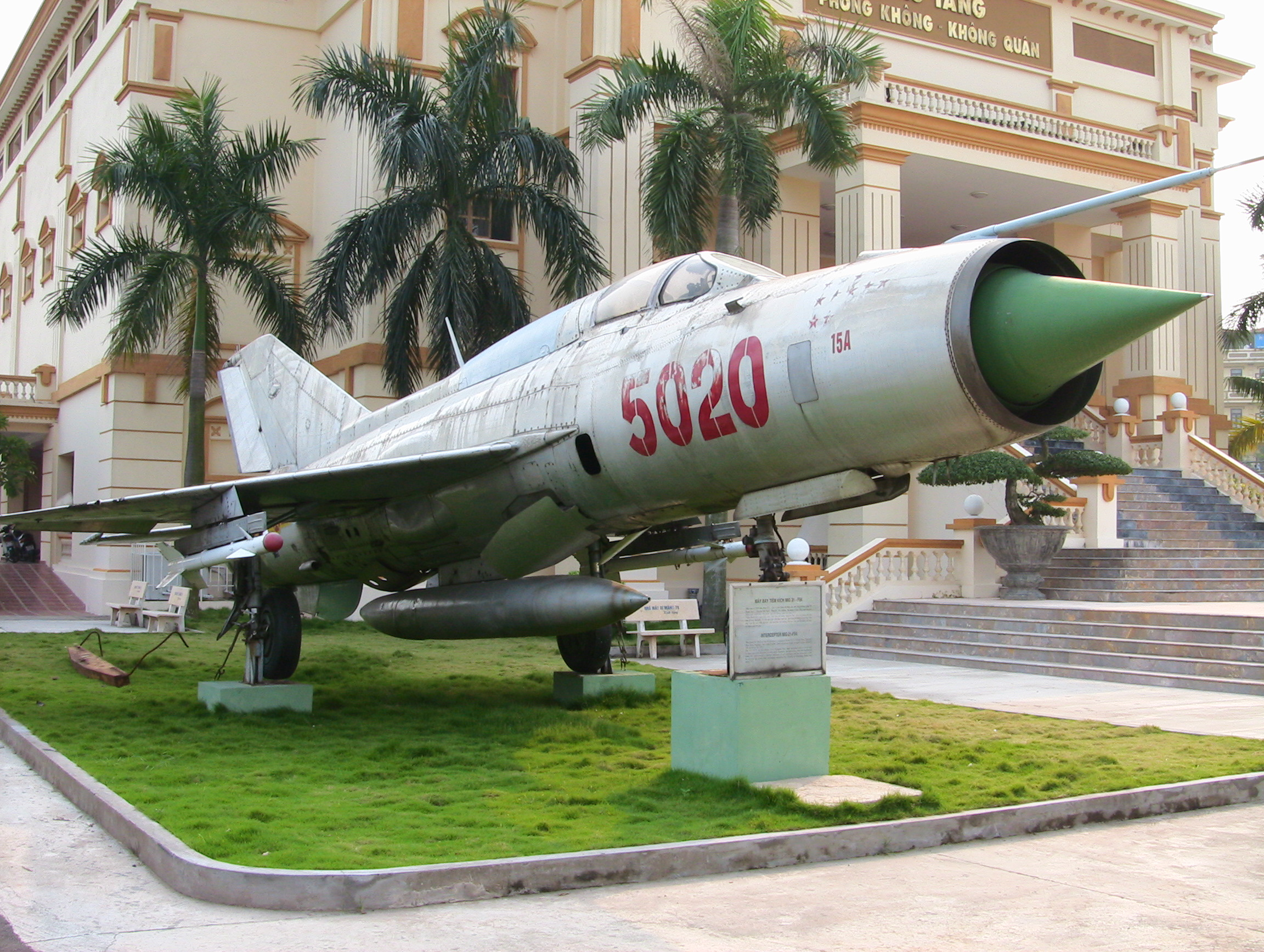
The MiG-21F94 piloted by Nguyen Tien Sam.

Nguyễn Tiến Sâm (born 1946 in Hanoi – died 2019) was a Mikoyan-Gurevich MiG-21 pilot of the Vietnamese People's Air Force, he flew with the 921st fighter regiment from 1968-72 and the 927th fighter regiment from 1972-75, and tied for fourth place amongst Vietnam War fighter aces with six kills.

Five of his six kills, all F-4 Phantom II fighters, are known for certain:

- 5 July 1972, a USAF F-4E (serial number 67-0296, 469th TFS/388th TFW, pilot Spencer, WSO Seek, POWs);
- 24 July 1972, a USAF F-4E (serial number 66-0369, 421st TFS/388th TFW, pilot Hodnett, WSO Fallert, both rescued);
- 29 July 1972, a USAF F-4E (serial number 66-0367, 4th TFS/388th TFW, pilot Kula, WSO Matsui, POWs);
- 12 September 1972, a USAF F-4E (serial number 69-7266, 335th TFS/4th TFW, pilot McMurray, WSO Zuberbuhler, POWs);
- 5 October 1972, a USAF F-4D (serial number 66-9838, 335th TFS/4th TFW, pilot Lewis, WSO Alpers, POWs).

== See also ==
- List of Vietnam War flying aces
