= Vũ Ngọc Đỉnh =

Vietnamese fighter ace

Vũ Ngọc Đỉnh was a North Vietnamese MiG-21 fighter ace of the Vietnamese People's Air Force's. Đỉnh flew with the 921st fighter regiment and tied for fourth place amongst Vietnam War fighter aces with six kills (four solo, two shared). He was awarded Hero of the People's Armed Forces in 1970. Đỉnh was married to Thu Hiền, a famous traditional singer who was later honored with People's Artist.

The following kills are credited to Đỉnh by the VPAF:

- 11 July 1966, a USAF F-105D (pilot McLelland)
- 30 April 1967, a USAF F-105D (pilot Abbott?)
- 19 November 1967, a USAF EB-66 (shared kill with Nguyễn Đăng Kỉnh);
- 17 December 1967, a USAF F-105D (pilot Ellis)
- 23 February 1968, a USAF F-4D (pilot Gutterson, WSO Donald)
- 28 January 1970, a USAF HH-53B (crew Bell, Leeser + 4)

== See also ==
- List of Vietnam War flying aces
