= Nguyễn Văn Nghĩa =

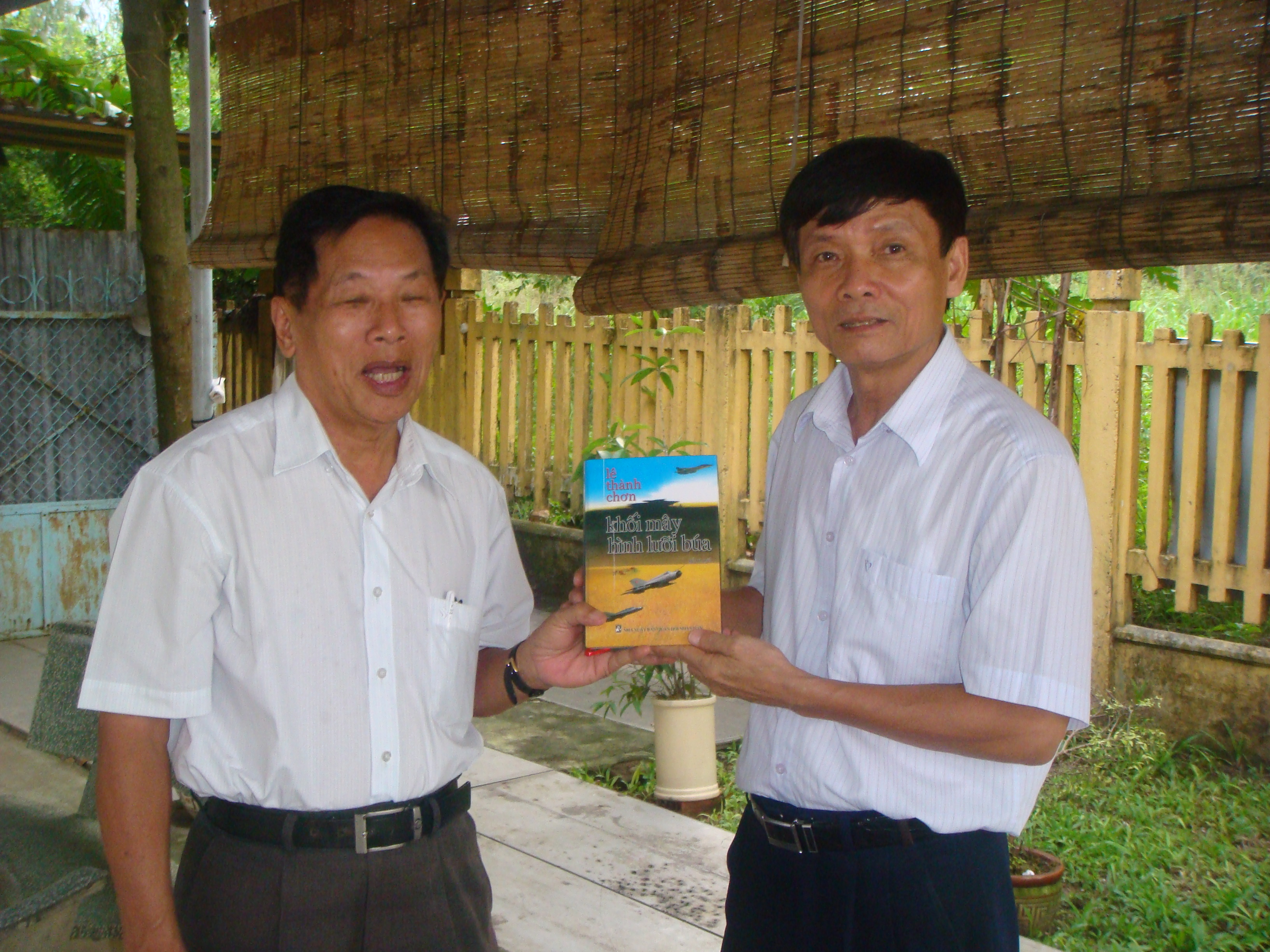
Officer Lê Thành Chơn and Col. Nguyễn Văn Nghĩa in Biên Hòa, November 2010.

Colonel Nguyễn Văn Nghĩa (born 1946) is a former Mikoyan-Gurevich MiG-21 pilot of the Vietnamese People's Air Force, he flew with the 927th fighter regiment and tied for fifth place amongst Vietnam War fighter aces with five kills.

The following kills are known to be credited to him by the VPAF:

- 23 June 1972, an F-4 Phantom (U.S. side does not confirm);
- 24 June 1972, a USAF F-4C (serial number 66-7636, 25th Tactical Fighter Squadron), pilot McCarty (KIA), WSO Jackson (POW);
- 6 October 1972, a USAF F-4E, pilot White, WSO Egge (both rescued);
- 24 November 1972, Ryan 147 Firebee/Lightning Bug drone;
- 23 December 1972, an F-4 Phantom (U.S. side does not confirm).

== See also ==
- List of Vietnam War flying aces
