= Nguyễn Ngọc Độ =

Nguyễn Ngọc Độ (born 1 November 1934 in Thanh Chương District in Nghệ An Province) is a former Mikoyan-Gurevich MiG-21 pilot of the Vietnamese People's Air Force. He flew with the 921st fighter regiment and tied for fourth place amongst Vietnam War fighter aces with six kills.

The following kills are known to be credited to him by the VPAF while flying the MiG-21 PFL Fishbed D model:

- 30 April 1967, a USAF F-105F (serial number 59-1726, 354th Tactical Fighter Squadron, pilot Thorness, RWO Johnson, POWs; a second F-105(D) claimed by Do's wingman Nguyễn Văn Cốc in this same flight);
- 05 May 1967, an F-105D (pilot Shively, POW, US claims shot down by AAA);
- 20 July 1967, an American F-4 Phantom II (shared kill with Phạm Thanh Ngân; pilot Corbitt, RWO Bare, KIA);
- 02 August 1967, an F-105 (not confirmed by the US);
- 16 September 1967, a USAF RF-101C (serial number 56-0180, 20th Tactical Reconnaissance Squadron, pilot Patterson, rescued, US claims AAA);
- 05 February 1968, an F-105D, (pilot Lasiter, POW, US confirms this loss dated 04 Feb., 1968, likely due to time-zone difference).

== See also ==
- List of Vietnam War flying aces
