= Nguyễn Đức Soát =

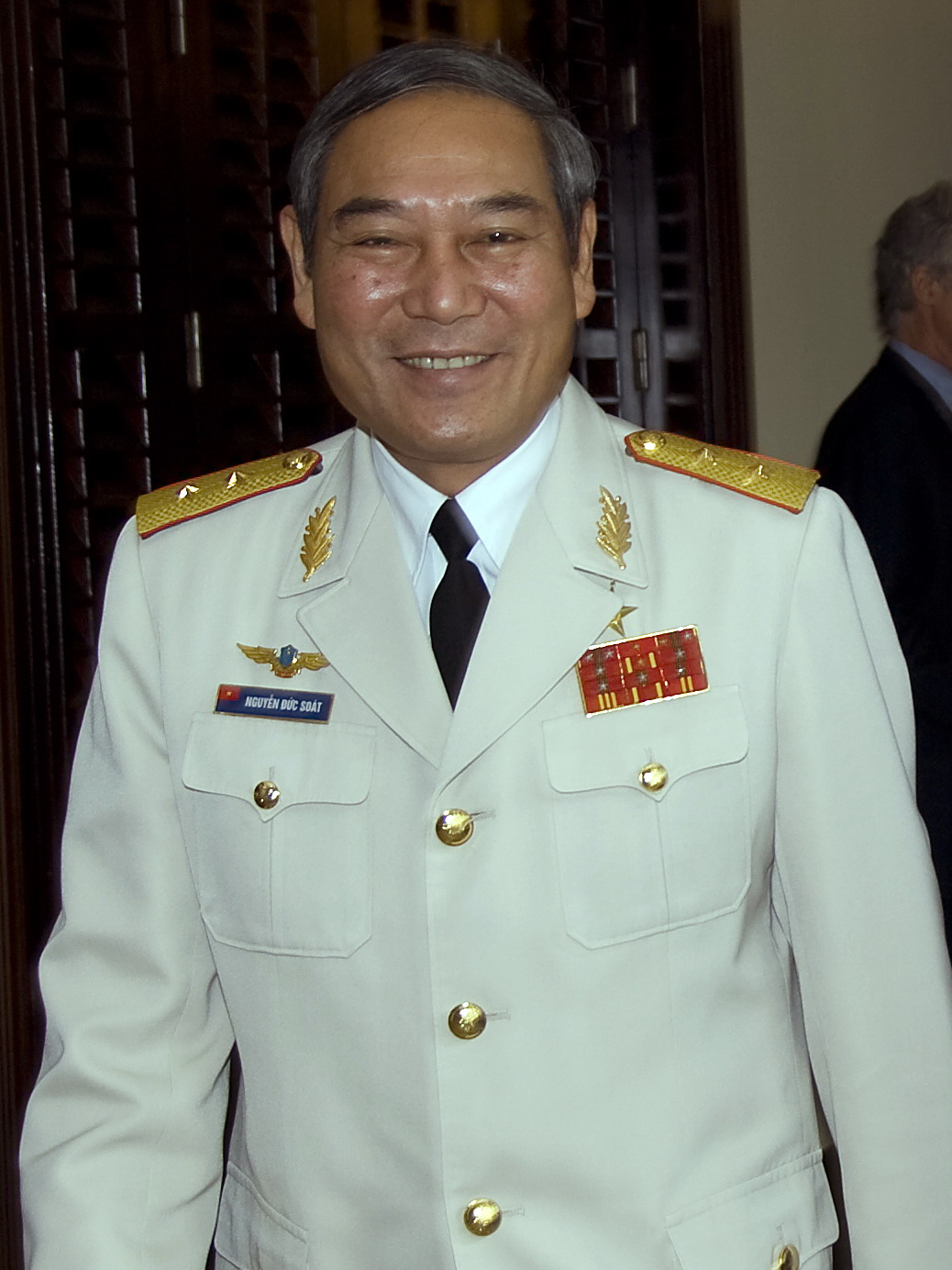
- General Nguyễn Đức Soát in December 2007
- Born: June 24, 1946 (age 80); Phú Xuyên, Hanoi, French Indochina
- Military career
- Allegiance: Vietnam
- Branch: Vietnam People's Air Force
- Service years: 1964–present
- Rank: Lieutenant General
- Commands: Deputy Chief of Staff of the Vietnam People's Army
- Conflicts: Vietnam War
- Awards: Hero of the People's Military Forces

Nguyễn Đức Soát is a former Mikoyan-Gurevich MiG-21 pilot of the Vietnamese People's Air Force, he flew with the 921st fighter regiment (later the 927th FR) and tied for fourth place amongst Vietnam War fighter aces with at least six kills.

The following are at least six kills acknowledged and credited to him by the VPAF:

- 13 March 1969, Ryan 147 Firebee/Lightning Bug drone;
- 23 May 1972, a USN A-7B (VA-93/USS Midway, pilot Barrett, KIA);
- 24 June 1972, a USAF F-4E (serial number 68-0315, 421st TFS, pilot Grant, WSO Beekman, POWs);
- 27 June 1972, a USAF F-4E (serial number 67-0248, 308th TFS, pilot Cerak, WSO Dingee, POWs);
- 30 July 1972, a USAF F-4D (serial number 66-7597, TFS, pilot Brooks, WSO McAdams, both rescued);
- 26 August 1972, a USMC F-4J (serial number 155811, VMFA-232, pilot Cordova, KIA, RIO Borders, rescued);
- 12 October 1972, a USAF F-4E (469th TFS/388th TFW, pilot Young, WSO Brunson, POWs).

He is now a lieutenant general and is the deputy chief of the general staff of the People's Army of Vietnam, and is deputy chairman of the National Committee for Search and Rescue.

== See also ==
- List of Vietnam War flying aces
- Phạm Tuân
