= Nguyễn Đăng Kính =

Vietnamese fighter ace

Nguyễn Đăng Kính (born 1941 in Nam Định Province) is a former Mikoyan-Gurevich MiG-21 pilot of the Vietnamese People's Air Force who flew with the 921st Fighter Regiment from 1965-1972, becoming a deputy commander of the newly established 927th FR from 1972-75, and tied for fourth place amongst Vietnam War fighter aces with six kills.

The following list of victories include the kills credited to him by the VPAF:

- 21 July 1966, a USAF Firebee/Lightning Bug unmanned aerial vehicle drone;
- 05 December 1966, USAF F-105D Thunderchief (pilot Begley, KIA);
- 8 November 1967, an American F-4 Phantom II (pilot Gordon, WSO Brenneman);
- 19 November 1967, a USAF EB-66 (shared kill with Vũ Ngọc Đỉnh);
- 3 January 1968, a USAF F-105D (pilot Bean);
- 14 January 1968, a USAF EB-66C (pilots Mercer and Terrell + 5) (shared kill with Dong Van Song);
- 3 March 1968, a USAF EB-66 (shared kill with a pilot named "Thanh");
- 21 September 1968, a USAF Firebee/Lightning Bug UAV drone;
- 26 October 1968, an F-4 Phantom II (US-side does not confirm).

== See also ==
- List of Vietnam War flying aces
- Weapons of the Vietnam War
