= Phúc Yên Air Base =

- Part of Vietnam People's Air Force
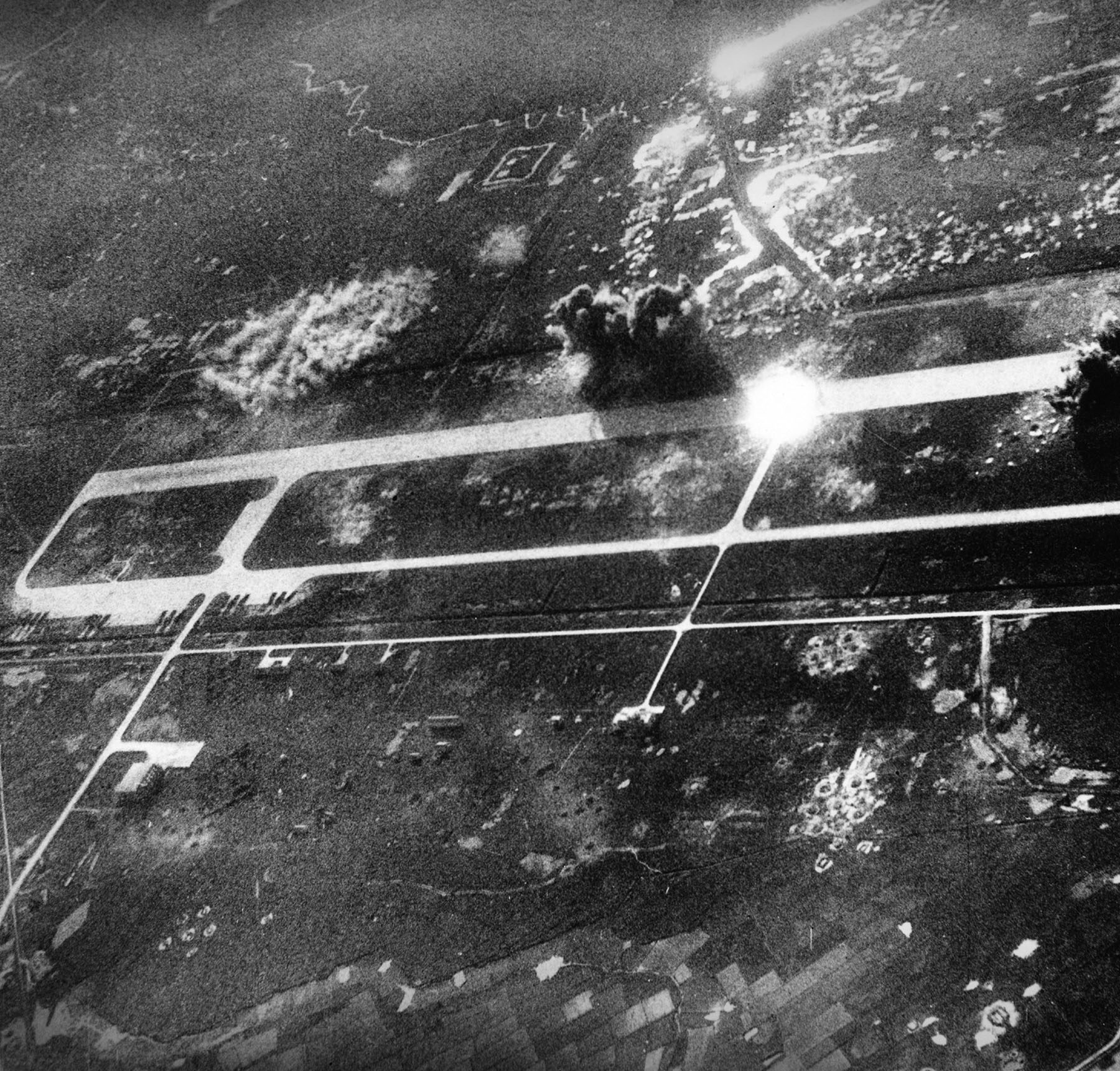
- Phúc Yên under attack in 1967

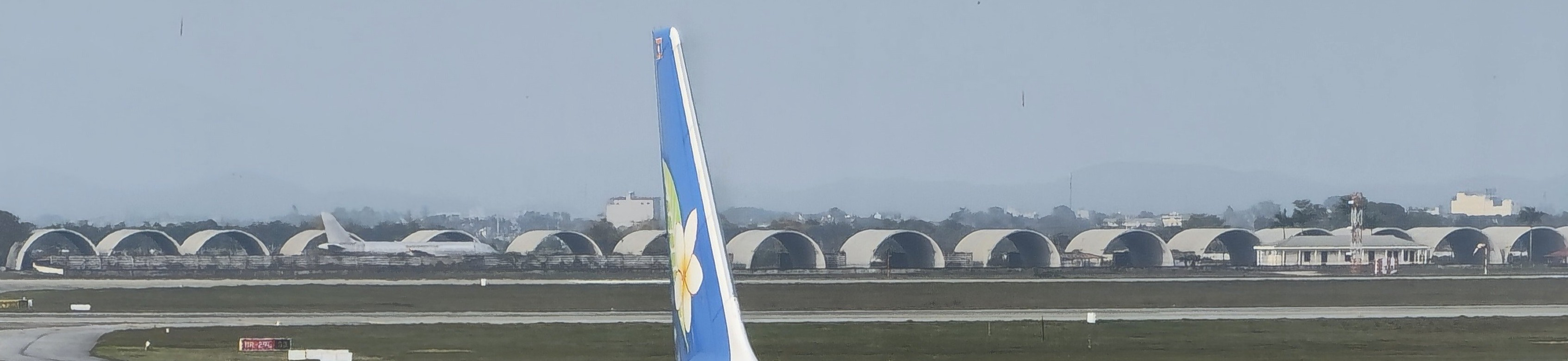
- The under-utilized military apron, as seen in 2025.

Site information
- Type: Air Force Base
- Controlled by: Vietnam People's Air Force

Location
- Coordinates: 21°13′16″N 105°48′26″E

Site history
- Built: 1960s
- In use: 6 August 1964 - November 2018
- Battles/wars: Vietnam War; Action of 23 August 1967

Airfield information
- IATA: none; ICAO: none

Summary
- Interactive map of Airfield information

Runways
Direction	Length		Surface
Direction	ft	m	Surface
29R/11L	9,170	2,795	Concrete
29L/11R	9,170	2,795	Concrete

Phúc Yên Air Base, also known as Nội Bài Air Base or Đa Phúc Air Base, is an inactive Vietnam People's Air Force military airfield exists as the nothernmost section of the contemporary Noi Bai International Airport and approximately 30 km (19 miles) north of Hanoi.

== History ==
=== Vietnam War ===
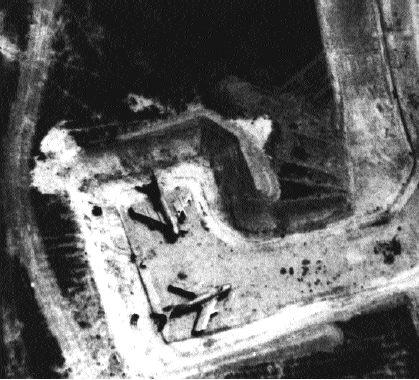
MiG-17s at Phuc Yen c.1966

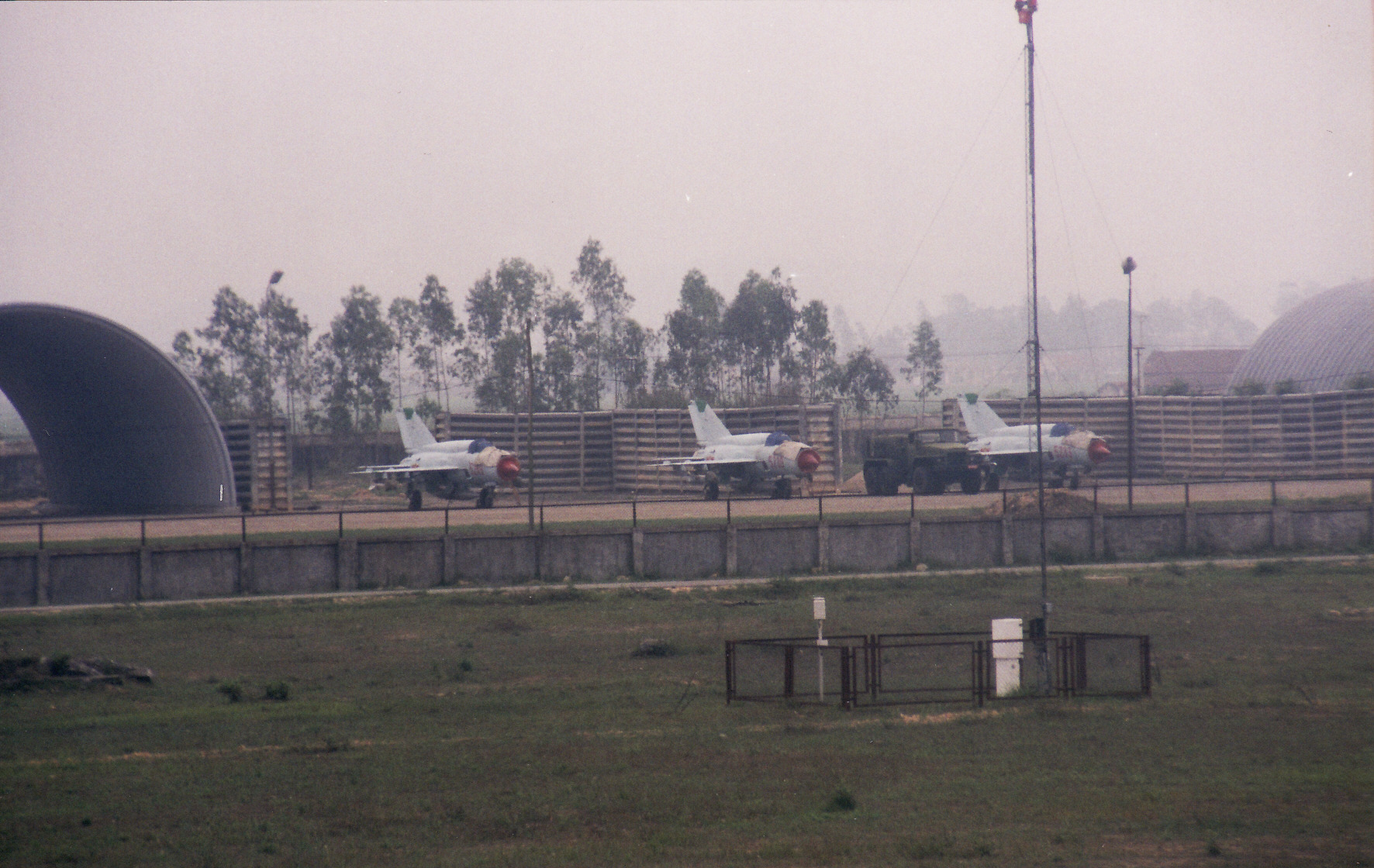
MiG-21s at Phuc Yen April 1998

Phúc Yên, constructed in 1963, was North Vietnam's first modern, jet-capable air base. It was built about 1 mile (1.6 km) north of an airstrip that had been abandoned in the 1950s. On 6 August 1964 the first VPAF jet fighter unit, the 921st Fighter Regiment (known as the Red Star Squadron), arrived at Phúc Yên after training in the People's Republic of China (PRC), bringing 36 MiG-17 and MiG-19 fighters.

In response to the attack on Bien Hoa Air Base on 1 November 1964 the Joint Chiefs of Staff (JCS) proposed a B-52 strike on Phúc Yên, but this was opposed by senior Johnson Administration officials.

At the start of Operation Rolling Thunder in March 1965, U.S. aircraft were forbidden to go within a radius of 40 nautical miles of Hanoi, which included Phúc Yên, although these restrictions were gradually reduced as the campaign continued.

In May 1965 Il-28 bombers were identified at Phúc Yên, as these aircraft were capable of conducting airstrikes on South Vietnam the JCS again proposed a B-52 strike on Phúc Yên and nearby SA-2 sites, but once again approval was denied for fear that such an attack might provoke increased Soviet and PRC support for North Vietnam or even PRC intervention in the war.

By late March 1966 U.S. intelligence indicated that more than 60 MiG-15s and MiG-17s and 15 MiG-21s were based at Phúc Yên while crates containing an estimated 5 MiG-15s and 25 MiG-21s were also at the base.

In April 1966 the CIA concluded that a small number of MiG-21s had possibly deployed to Kép Air Base from Phúc Yên.

On 7 July 1966, two VPAF MiG-21PFL Type Ds on Combat Air Patrol (CAP) duty over Noi Bai (Phuc Yen) piloted by Nguyen Nhat Chieu and his wingman Tran Ngoc Siu intercepted USAF F-105Ds, shooting down one piloted by Capt. Tomes using UB-16-57/S-5M unguided rockets; this was the first instance of a VPAF MiG-21 shooting down a piloted enemy aircraft.

On 24/5 October 1967 in response to increased VPAF fighter interceptions USAF, Navy and Marine aircraft attacked Phúc Yên for the first time. Post-strike assessment indicated that nine MiGs had been destroyed on the ground and one in the air and that the runway was severely cratered.

On 18 November 1967 a Combat Skyspot attack by 16 F-105s of the 388th Tactical Fighter Wing preceded by 4 F-105 Wild Weasels on Phúc Yên resulted in the loss of 2 Wild Weasels to MiGs and then some of the bombers to SAM sites that tracked the USAF jamming.

In early 1968 U.S. intelligence noted that Il-28 bombers had returned to Phúc Yên and three separate airstrikes were conducted against the base in mid-February. One Il-28 was believed to have been damaged in the raid while two MiG-17s were shot down.

On the morning of 9 May 1972 as US Navy aircraft were conducting Operation Pocket Money, the mining of Haiphong harbor, radar on the USS Chicago detected three MiGs departing Phuc Yen and heading directly towards the mining aircraft. Chicago launched two Talos surface to air missiles at the MiGs, now 48 miles (77 km) away. One of the MiGs was destroyed while the other two returned to base.

On 30 September 1972 U.S. jets attacked the base destroying two MiG-21s and one MiG-19 on the ground and damaging four other MiG-21s.

Phúc Yên, Kép and Hoa Lac were targeted on the first night of Operation Linebacker II on 18 December 1972 to suppress fighters that might otherwise intercept US attack aircraft.

=== Postwar ===
In 1978 Noi Bai International Airport was established immediately south of the base to replace Gia Lam Airport as the main commercial airport servicing Hanoi.

=== Modern usage ===
The VPAF 921st Fighter Regiment operating MiG-21s and Su-22M4/UM3K once stationed at Phúc Yên before moving to Yên Bái. Since the unit's departure, the airport's military sector has remained largely inactive.
