= List of Vietnam War flying aces =

The claimed flying aces of the Vietnam War, pilots who shot down five or more enemy aircraft, include 19 Vietnam People's Air Force (VPAF) pilots, (six MiG-17 and 13 MiG-21 pilots), and five Americans.

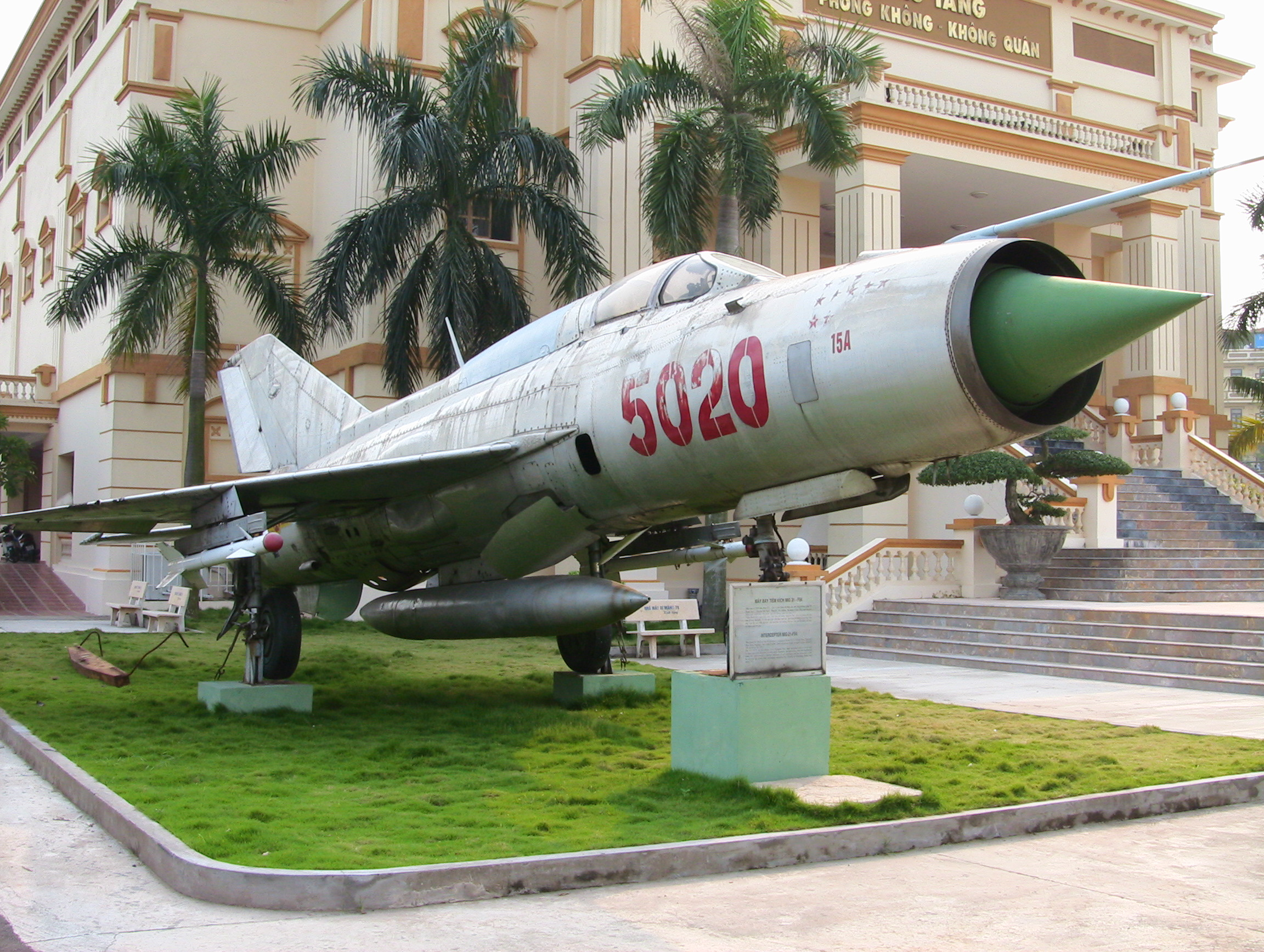
A MiG-21 of the VPAF which became the primary fighter-interceptor against USAF and USN aircraft.

== United States' aces ==
All the American aces flew as members of two-man crews on F-4 Phantoms, reflecting the emergence of air-to-air missiles as the primary weapons of aerial combat; both crewmen were awarded a kill for each VPAF aircraft shot-down. The F-4 Phantom II crew consisted of a pilot and a radar intercept officer (RIO) in the United States Navy (USN) or a weapon systems officers (WSO) in the United States Air Force (USAF). This crew configuration allowed for effective multi-role combat capabilities and improved coordination in air-to-air engagements. The pilot primarily focused on flying the aircraft and managing the missile systems, while the RIO or WSO operated the radar, navigational systems, and weapon targeting systems. Two American aces were pilots, two USAF WSOs, and one USN RIO.

== List ==
Name	Country	Service	Victories	Aircraft
Nguyễn Văn Cốc	North Vietnam	VPAF	9	MiG-21
Mai Văn Cường	North Vietnam	VPAF	8	MiG-21
Nguyễn Hồng Nhị	North Vietnam	VPAF	8	MiG-21
Phạm Thanh Ngân	North Vietnam	VPAF	8	MiG-21
Đặng Ngọc Ngự †	North Vietnam	VPAF	7	MiG-21
Nguyễn Văn Bảy	North Vietnam	VPAF	7	MiG-17
Charles B. DeBellevue (WSO)	United States	USAF	6	F-4D/E Phantom II
Lê Hải	North Vietnam	VPAF	6	MiG-17
Lê Thanh Đạo	North Vietnam	VPAF	6	MiG-21
Lưu Huy Chao	North Vietnam	VPAF	6	MiG-17
Nguyễn Đức Soát	North Vietnam	VPAF	6	MiG-21
Nguyễn Đăng Kính	North Vietnam	VPAF	6	MiG-21
Nguyễn Ngọc Độ	North Vietnam	VPAF	6	MiG-21
Nguyễn Nhật Chiêu	North Vietnam	VPAF	6	MiG-17, MiG-21
Nguyễn Tiến Sâm	North Vietnam	VPAF	6	MiG-21
Vũ Ngọc Đỉnh	North Vietnam	VPAF	6	MiG-21
Randy Cunningham (pilot)	United States	USN	5	F-4J Phantom II
William P. Driscoll (RIO)	United States	USN	5	F-4J Phantom II
R. Stephen Ritchie (pilot)	United States	USAF	5	F-4D/E Phantom II
Jeffrey S. Feinstein (WSO)	United States	USAF	5	F-4D/E Phantom II
Le Quang Trung †	North Vietnam	VPAF	5	MiG-17, MiG-19
Nguyễn Văn Nghĩa	North Vietnam	VPAF	5	MiG-21
Nguyễn Phi Hung †	North Vietnam	VPAF	5	MiG-17
Võ Văn Mẫn †	North Vietnam	VPAF	5	MiG-17

One source reported that the North Vietnamese claimed to have shot down 218 U.S. crewed aircraft in air to air combat in Vietnam. Of those kills, 85 are not supported by U.S. records, while another 37 were attributed by the U.S. to surface-to-air missiles and anti-aircraft fire. Another source claims that the U.S. attributed losses to surface-to-air missiles and anti-aircraft fire because it was considered "less embarrassing". Estimates of North Vietnamese losses range from 131, as documented in North Vietnamese records; to 195, as claimed by U.S. records.

William A. Sayers writing in 2019 asserted that North Vietnam only had three aces in the war including Phạm Thanh Ngân, with the other "aces" being creations of North Vietnamese propaganda that included claimed "kills" on days where no U.S. losses occurred, crediting VPAF pilots with kills that had actually been achieved by surface to air missile or antiaircraft artillery units and shootdowns of drones. He also stated that there were no MiG-17 aces.

== See also ==
- List of United States aerial victories of the Vietnam War
- Colonel Tomb, a high-ranking VPAF fighter-ace whom the Americans claimed to have killed
