= Nguyễn Nhật Chiêu =

Nguyễn Nhật Chiêu (born 1934 in Nam Sách District in Hải Dương Province) was a Mikoyan-Gurevich MiG-21 pilot of the Vietnamese People's Air Force (VPAF); he flew with the 921st Fighter Regiment first with the MiG-17 before transitioning into the MiG-21, and is tied for fourth place amongst Vietnam War fighter aces with six kills.

Contrary to popular accounts in U.S. text, Nguyễn Nhật Chiêu preferred flying the MiG-21 into combat over the MiG-17, stating that: "for me personally, I preferred the MiG-21 because it was superior in all aspects of climb, speed and armament. The Atoll missile was very accurate and I scored four kills with the Atoll... in general combat conditions I was always confident of a kill over an F-4 Phantom when flying a MiG-21."

The following kills are officially acknowledged and credited to him by the VPAF:

- 20 September 1965, an American F-4 Phantom II (shot-down the F-4 while flying a MiG-17);
- 7 July 1966, a USAF F-105D Thunderchief (pilot Tomes, POW, credited to Chieu's wingman Tran Ngoc Siu, first victory over piloted American fighter with the MiG-21);
- 17 July 1967, a USN F-8 Crusader;
- 23 August 1967, a USAF F-4D (pilot Tyler, POW, RWO Sittner, KIA);
- 7 October 1967, a USAF F-105F Wild Weasel (pilot Howard, RWO Shamblee, both rescued);
- 29 October 1967, an F-4 Phantom (not confirmed by the US).

== See also ==
- List of Vietnam War flying aces
- Weapons of the Vietnam War
