= Mai Văn Cường =

North Vietnamese pilot and flying ace

Major General Mai Văn Cường (born 1941) is a former North Vietnamese Mikoyan-Gurevich MiG-21 pilot and flying ace, who he flew with the 921st fighter regiment and tied for second place amongst Vietnam War fighter aces with eight kills.

20-year-old Mai Van Cuong began training as a MiG-17 pilot in the Soviet Union from 1961 to 1964, advancing to the MiG-21 from 1965 to 1966, and has acquired a unique distinction of being the 'top drone-killing pilot of the Vietnam War', achieving no less than six kills over US Ryan 147 Firebee/Lightning Bug drone; his victory-claims list including the kills officially acknowledged by the VPAF is as follows:

- 8 October 1966, USAF F-105 Thunderchief, US-side does not confirm;
- 28 April 1967, USAF F-105D Thunderchief, pilot Caras (KIA);
- 16 May 1967, Firebee/Lightning Bug UAV drone;
- 30 September 1967, USAF F-105 Thunderchief, US-side does not confirm;
- 7 October 1967, F-4 Phantom II, damaged;
- 19 June 1968, Firebee/Lightning Bug UAV drone;
- 3 September 1968, Firebee/Lightning Bug UAV drone;
- 20 September 1968, Firebee/Lightning Bug UAV drone;
- 9 February 1969, Firebee/Lightning Bug UAV drone;
- 24 June 1969, Firebee/Lightning Bug UAV drone.

== See also ==
- List of Vietnam War flying aces
- Weapons of the Vietnam War
