= Jeffrey Feinstein =

Career officer of the United States Air Force

Jeffrey S. Feinstein
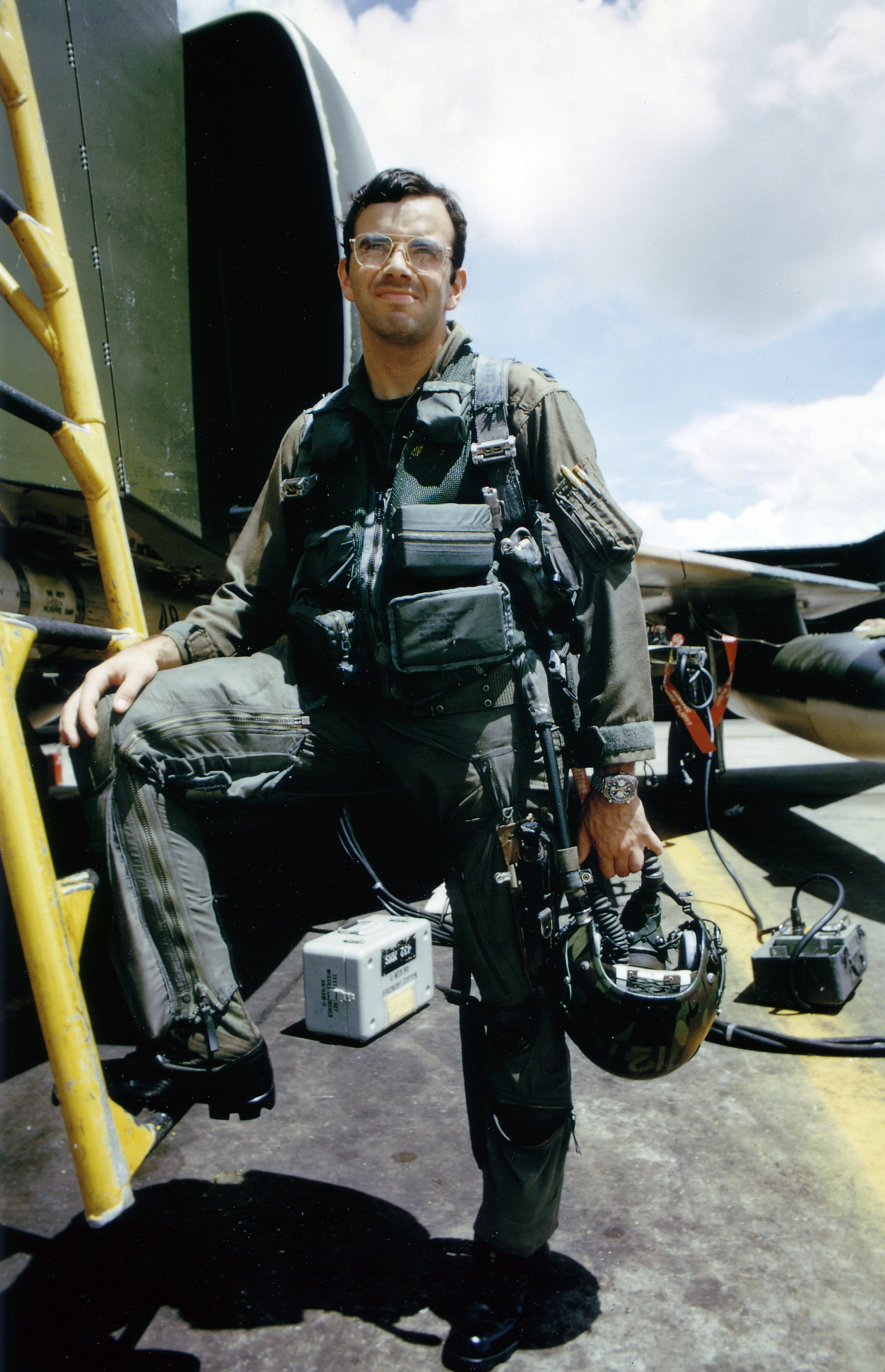
- Captain Jeffrey Feinstein poses beside his F-4 Phantom II at Udorn Air Base, Thailand, in September 1972
- Born: January 29, 1945 (age 81); Chicago, Illinois, U.S.
- Military career
- Allegiance: United States of America
- Branch: United States Air Force
- Service years: 1963–1996
- Rank: Lieutenant Colonel
- Nickname: Jeff
- Unit: 432nd Tactical Reconnaissance Wing
- Conflicts: Vietnam War; Gulf War
- Awards: Air Force Cross; Silver Star (4); Legion of Merit; Distinguished Flying Cross (5); Bronze Star Medal; Purple Heart; Meritorious Service Medal; Air Medal (23)

Jeffrey S. Feinstein (born January 29, 1945) is a retired career officer of the United States Air Force (USAF). During the Vietnam War, Feinstein was a weapon systems officer, an integral part of two-man aircrews with the emergence of air-to-air missiles as the primary weapons during aerial combat. Flying aboard F-4 Phantom IIs, Feinstein downed five enemy aircraft, thereby becoming a flying ace, the last of five U.S. aviators to become aces during that conflict and to date still the most recent aviator to achieve ace status in the U.S. military.

== Early life ==
Born in Chicago, Illinois, on January 29, 1945, Feinstein enlisted in the USAF in 1963 to attend the United States Military Academy Preparatory School. He subsequently entered the United States Air Force Academy in 1964 and graduated in 1968.

== Military career ==
Feinstein was rejected from pilot training due to excessive myopia. He then underwent Undergraduate Navigator Training and he graduated.

While assigned to the 80th Tactical Fighter Squadron, he was detached to the 13th Tactical Fighter Squadron, part of the 432d Tactical Reconnaissance Wing, based at Udorn Royal Thai Air Force Base, Thailand. His actions, for which he received multiple awards of the Distinguished Flying Cross and Silver Star for his first four kills and the Air Force Cross for his fifth kill, took place prior to and during Operation Linebacker in 1972, making him a flying ace.

His nickname/tactical callsign was "Fang." Having originally been designated as an Air Force Navigator, he was given a vision waiver after Vietnam (Feinstein wore glasses to correct mild nearsightedness to 20/20).

Reassigned to the 9th Air Force staff at Shaw AFB, South Carolina in the 1990s, Feinstein also flew as Airborne Command Element Director aboard E-3 Sentry AWACS aircraft during Operations Desert Shield and Desert Storm from August 1990 to February 1991.

Lieutenant Colonel Feinstein retired from the U.S. Air Force on 1 July 1996.

== Awards and decorations ==
In addition to his Command Pilot wings, Navigator wings, and Parachutist wings, Feinstein was awarded the Air Force Cross, Silver Star (4 awards), Legion of Merit, Distinguished Flying Cross with Combat "V" (5 awards), Bronze Star Medal, Purple Heart, Meritorious Service Medal, Air Medal (23 awards), Aerial Achievement Medal, Air Force Commendation Medal, and numerous unit, expeditionary and service awards.

US Air Force Command Pilot Badge
United States Air Force Navigator Badge
Air Force Parachutist Badge
Air Force Cross
Silver Star w/ 3 bronze oak leaf clusters	Legion of Merit	Distinguished Flying Cross w/ Valor device and 3 bronze oak leaf clusters
Distinguished Flying Cross (second ribbon required for accouterment spacing)	Bronze Star	Purple Heart
Meritorious Service Medal	Air Medal w/ 3 bronze oak leaf clusters	Aerial Achievement Medal
Air Force Commendation Medal	Air Force Presidential Unit Citation	Air Force Outstanding Unit Award w/ Valor device and three bronze oak leaf clusters
Air Force Outstanding Unit Award (second ribbon required for accouterment spacing)	Combat Readiness Medal	Air Force Good Conduct Medal
National Defense Service Medal w/ 1 bronze service star	Armed Forces Expeditionary Medal w/ 1 bronze service star	Vietnam Service Medal w/ 2 bronze campaign stars
Southwest Asia Service Medal w/ 2 bronze campaign stars	Korea Defense Service Medal	Humanitarian Service Medal
Air Force Overseas Short Tour Service Ribbon w/ 2 bronze oak leaf clusters	Air Force Overseas Long Tour Service Ribbon w/ 1 bronze oak leaf cluster	Air Force Longevity Service Award w/ 1 silver and 2 bronze oak leaf clusters
Small Arms Expert Marksmanship Ribbon	Air Force Training Ribbon	Republic of Vietnam Gallantry Cross
Vietnam Campaign Medal	Kuwait Liberation Medal (Saudi Arabia)	Kuwait Liberation Medal (Kuwait)

=== Air Force Cross citation ===
Feinstein, Jeffrey S.,
Captain, U.S Air Force
13th Tactical Fighter Squadron, 432d Tactical Reconnaissance Wing, Udorn Royal Thai Air Base, Thailand
Date of Action: October 13, 1972

Citation:

The President of the United States of America, authorized by Title 10, Section 8742, United States Code, takes pleasure in presenting the Air Force Cross to Captain Jeffrey S. Feinstein, United States Air Force, for extraordinary heroism in military operations against an opposing armed force as an F-4D Phantom Weapon Systems Officer in the 13th Tactical Fighter Squadron, 432d Tactical Reconnaissance Wing, Udorn Royal Thai Air Force Base, Thailand, in action against the Paul Doumer Bridge, a major north-south transportation link on Hanoi's Red River in North Vietnam, on 13 October 1972. On that date, while protecting a large strike force attacking a high priority target deep in hostile territory, Captain Feinstein engaged two enemy aircraft and destroyed one as they attacked the vulnerable chaff-dispensing flight. Having destroyed one of the aircraft and realizing that his wingman was coming under fire, Captain Feinstein continued his attack on the second enemy aircraft. This courageous and aggressive maneuver negated the immediate threat to his wingman and caused the second MiG-21 to flee the area in which he would constitute a threat to the strike forces. Through his extraordinary heroism, superb airmanship, and aggressiveness in the face of hostile forces, Captain Feinstein reflected the highest credit upon himself and the United States Air Force.

== MiG kill summary ==
Date (1972)	TFS	Pilot	Weapon systems officer	Acft	Tail code	Call sign	Wpn	Kill
April 16	13	Major E. Daniel Cherry	Capt Jeffrey S. Feinstein	F-4D 66-7550	PN	Basco 3	AIM-7	MiG-21
May 31	13	Capt Bruce G. Leonard Jr.	Capt J.S. Feinstein	F-4E 68-0338	ED	Gopher 03	AIM-9	MiG-21
July 18	13	Lt Col Carl G. Baily	Capt J.S. Feinstein	F-4D 66-0271	OY	Snug 01	AIM-9	MiG-21
July 29	13	Lt Col Carl G. Baily	Capt J.S. Feinstein	F-4D 66-0271	OY	Cadillac 01	AIM-7	MiG-21
October 13	13	Lt Col Curtis D. Westphal	Capt J.S. Feinstein	F-4D 66-7501	OC	Olds 01	AIM-7	MiG-21
