= List of people with surname Nguyễn =

Nguyễn is the most common Vietnamese surname, held by an estimated 40 percent of Vietnamese people. Outside of Vietnam, the surname is commonly rendered without diacritics, as Nguyen. The following is an incomplete list of individuals with this surname.

== Heads of state or government ==
- Nguyễn Cao Kỳ, former prime minister of South Vietnam (1930–2011)
- Nguyễn dynasty, ruled Vietnam from 1802 to 1945
  - Gia Long (born Nguyễn Phúc Ánh, 1762–1820)
  - Minh Mạng (born Nguyễn Phúc Đảm)
  - Thiệu Trị (born Nguyễn Phúc Miên Tông)
  - Tự Đức (born Nguyễn Phúc Hồng Nhậm)
  - Dục Đức (born Nguyễn Phúc Ưng Chân)
  - Hiệp Hòa (born Nguyễn Phúc Hồng Dật)
  - Kiến Phúc (born Nguyễn Phúc Ưng Đăng)
  - Hàm Nghi (born Nguyễn Phúc Ưng Lịch)
  - Đồng Khánh (born Nguyễn Phúc Ưng Đường)
  - Thành Thái (born Nguyễn Phúc Bửu Lân)
  - Duy Tân (born Nguyễn Phúc Vĩnh San, 1899–1945)
  - Khải Định (born Nguyễn Phúc Bửu Đảo, d. 1925)
  - Bảo Đại (born Nguyễn Phúc Vĩnh Thụy, 1913–1997)
- Nguyễn Hữu Thọ (1910–1996)
- Nguyễn Khánh, prime minister of South Vietnam (1927–2013)
- Empress Nam Phương (1913–1963), consort of Bảo Đại, born Nguyễn Hữu Thị Lan
- Nguyễn lords, the precursors to the Nguyễn Dynasty, who ruled southern Vietnam from 1558 to 1775
  - Nguyễn Kim (1476–1545)
  - Nguyễn Hoàng (1525–1613)
  - Nguyễn Phúc Nguyên (1563–1635)
  - Nguyễn Phúc Lan (1601–1648)
  - Nguyễn Phúc Tần (1620–1687)
  - Nguyễn Phúc Thái (1650–1691)
  - Nguyễn Phúc Chu (1675–1725)
  - Nguyễn Phúc Thụ (also spelled Nguyễn Phúc Chú, 1696–1738)
  - Nguyễn Phúc Khoát (1714–1765)
  - Nguyễn Phúc Thuần (1754–1777)
- Nguyễn Minh Triết, president of Vietnam (born 1942)
- Nguyễn Ngọc Thơ, Prime Minister of South Vietnam (1908–1976)
- Nguyễn Phan Long, Prime Minister (1889–1960)
- Hồ Chí Minh, Vietnamese Communist statesman and revolutionary; founded independent Vietnam (born Nguyễn Sinh Cung, 1890–1969)
- Nguyễn Tấn Dũng, Prime Minister of Vietnam (b. 1949)
- Nguyễn Thị Anh, queen of Vietnam (1422?–1459)
- Nguyễn Văn Tâm, Prime Minister (1895–1990)
- Nguyễn Văn Thiệu, general and president of South Vietnam (1923–2001)
- Tây Sơn dynasty, founded by the Tây Sơn brothers (Nguyễn Nhạc, Nguyễn Lữ, and Nguyễn Huệ), ruled from 1778 to 1802
  - Nguyễn Huệ, ruled as Emperor Quang Trung (1753–1792)

== Actors and television personalities ==
- Dustin Nguyen, Vietnamese American television and film actor (born 1962)
- Jillian Nguyen, Australian actress
- Navia Nguyen, model and actress
- Thai Nguyen, Vietnamese-American fashion designer and television personality

== Artists ==
- Dustin Nguyen (born 1962), comic book artist
- Jacqueline Hoang Nguyen, artist
- Mike Nguyen, artist
- Trung Le Nguyen (born 1990), cartoonist

== Athletes ==
- Ben Nguyen, American mixed martial arts fighter (b. 1988)
- Bi Nguyen, American former mixed martial artist, Muay Thai kickboxer, and realty competition contestant (b. 1989)
- Daniel Nguyen, Vietnamese-American tennis player (b. 1990)
- Dat Nguyen, American NFL linebacker (Dallas Cowboys) (b. 1975)
- Dat Nguyen (boxer), Vietnamese-American boxer and bare-knuckle boxer (b. 1982)
- Don Nguyen, American professional skateboarder (b. 1979)
- Lee Nguyen, American footballer (Randers FC, New England Revolution) (b. 1986)
- Marcel Nguyen, German gymnast (b. 1987)
- Martin Nguyen, Vietnamese-Australian mixed martial artist (b. 1989)
- Nam Nguyen, Canadian figure skater (b. 1998)
- Nguyễn Công Phượng, Vietnamese footballer (b. 1995)
- Nguyễn Hồng Sơn, Vietnamese footballer (b. 1970)
- Nguyễn Lộc, martial artist (1912–1960)
- Nguyễn Minh Phương, Vietnamese footballer (b. 1980)
- Nguyễn Quang Hải, Vietnamese footballer (b. 1997)
- Nguyễn Tiến Linh, Vietnamese footballer (b. 1997)
- Nguyễn Văn Hùng, martial artist (b. 1980)
- Rob Nguyen, Australian racing car driver (b. 1980)

== Chess players ==
- Nguyễn Anh Dũng (b. 1976)
- Nguyễn Anh Khôi (b. 2002)
- Nguyễn Đức Hòa (b. 1989)
- Nguyễn Ngọc Trường Sơn (b. 1990)
- Piotr Nguyen (b. 1991)
- Thai Dai Van Nguyen (b. 2001)
- Nguyễn Thị Mai Hưng (b. 1994)
- Nguyễn Thị Thanh An (b. 1976)
- Nguyễn Văn Huy (b. 1985)

== Journalists ==
- Betty Nguyen, CNN news anchor (b. 1974)
- Chau Nguyen, Houston-area news anchor (b. 1973)
- Émilie Tran Nguyen (born 1985), French journalist
- Leyna Nguyen, Los Angeles-area news anchor (b. 1969)
- Nguyen Qui Duc, Vietnamese American writer
- Vicky Nguyen, San Jose-area news reporter
- Mary Nguyen, Orlando area news reporter (b. 1976)

== Military ==
- Nguyễn Chánh Thi, ARVN general (1923–2007)
- Nguyễn Chí Thanh, Vietnam People's Army (PAVN) general (1914–1967)
- Nguyễn Đăng Kính, North Vietnamese fighter ace (born 1941)
- Nguyễn Đức Soát, Vietnamese lieutenant general and flying ace (born 1946)
- Nguyễn Hồng Nhị, North Vietnamese fighter pilot (1936–2021)
- Nguyễn Hữu Có, ARVN general (1925–2012)
- Nguyễn Khoa Nam, ARVN general (1927–1975)
- Nguyễn Ngọc Độ, North Vietnamese fighter pilot (born 1934)
- Nguyễn Ngọc Loan, ARVN General (1930–1998)
- Nguyễn Nhật Chiêu, North Vietnamese fighter ace (born 1934)
- Nguyễn Qúy An, air force major (b. 1943)
- Nguyễn Tiến Sâm, North Vietnamese fighter ace (1946–2019)
- Nguyễn Văn Bảy, North Vietnamese fighter ace (1936–2019)
- Nguyễn Văn Cốc, North Vietnamese fighter pilot (b. 1942)
- Nguyễn Văn Cử, pilot and lieutenant in the Republic of Vietnam Air Force (1934–2013)
- Nguyễn Văn Hiếu, ARVN general (1929–1975)
- Nguyễn Văn Hinh, military chief of state (1915–2004)
- Nguyễn Văn Nhung, assassin of Ngo Dinh Diem (d. 1964)
- Nguyễn Văn Nghĩa, North Vietnamese fighter pilot (born 1946)
- Nguyễn Văn Minh, ARVN general (1929–2006)
- Nguyễn Văn Toàn, ARVN general (1932–2005)

== Models ==
- Nguyễn Diệu Hoa, Miss Vietnam (b. 1969)
- Navia Nguyen (b. 1973)
- Tila Tequila, model, singer, Internet personality, and reality star (born Tila Nguyen in 1981)
- Nguyễn Thúc Thùy Tiên, model and Miss Grand International 2021 (b. 1998)
- Nguyễn Thùy Lâm, model, competed in Miss Universe 2008 and made into the top 15. (b. 1987)
- Nguyễn Minh Tú, model, Asia's Next Top Model Cycle 5 runner-up, model mentor in Asia's Next Top Model Cycle 6 and The Face Vietnam 2 and a candidate in Miss Supranational 2018 representing Vietnam (b. 1991)
- Nikita Dragun, American YouTuber, make-up artist and model (b. 1996)

== Musicians ==
- Duy Khánh, singer/composer born Nguyễn Văn Diệp (1936–2003)
- Nguyễn Cao Kỳ Duyên, Vietnamese American singer (born 1969)
- Hoàng Hải, singer (born Nguyễn Hoàng Hải in 1982)
- Khánh Ly, singer (born Nguyễn Lệ Mai in 1945)
- Phương Vy, singer; winner of 2007 Vietnam Idol competition (born Nguyễn Ngọc Phương Vy in 1987)
- Quynh Nguyen, classical pianist (born 1976)
- Thao Nguyen, indie-rock/alternative-folk singer and songwriter from Virginia (born 1984)
- Michael Ray Nguyen-Stevenson, American rapper (also known as Tyga, born 1989)
- Nguyen Thien Dao, Vietnamese-French classical composer (1940–2015)
- Sơn Tùng M-TP (born Nguyễn Thanh Tùng), Vietnamese singer and songwriter (born 1994)
- Trish Thuy Trang (born Nguyễn Thùy Trang), Vietnamese-American singer and songwriter (born 1980)
- Tila Nguyen, better known by her stage name Tila Tequila, a Singapore-born French-Vietnamese American singer-songwriter and reality star (A Shot at Love with Tila Tequila) (born 1981)
- Van-Anh Nguyen (born 1987), Australian classical pianist
- Văn Cao, popular songwriter who wrote the national anthem of Vietnam, Tiến Quân Ca (born Nguyễn Văn Cao, 1923–1995)

== Physicians ==
- Nguyễn Tài Thu, practitioner of traditional medicine (1931–2021)
- Nguyen Van Nghi, practitioner of traditional medicine (1909–1999)

== Poets ==
- Nguyễn Bỉnh Khiêm, considered a saint by the Cao Đài religion (1492–1587)
- Nguyễn Chí Thiện, dissident poet (1939–2012)
- Nguyễn Du, wrote The Tale of Kiều (1765–1820)
- Hoa Nguyen, American poet (b. 1967)
- Nguyễn Khuyến (1835–1909)
- Tố Hữu (born Nguyễn Kim Thành, 1920–2002)
- Nguyễn Trãi, poet and national and cultural hero of Vietnam (1380–1442)

== Poker players ==
- Danny Nguyen, live low stakes poker player
- Men Nguyen (b. 1954), Vietnamese-American boss poker player
- Minh Nguyen, Vietnamese-American double bracelet winner
- Scotty Nguyen (b. 1962), winner of the 1998 World Series of Poker Main Event

== Politicians ==
- Nguyễn Bá Thanh (1953–2015)
- Nguyễn Hợp Đoàn, mayor of Saigon (1928–2002)
- Nguyễn Hữu Thọ, Vietnamese lawyer and politician; founder of the NLF (1910–1996)
- Nguyễn Phú Trọng (1944–2024), General Secretary of the Communist Party of Vietnam.
- Nguyễn Sinh Hùng, First Deputy Prime Minister of Vietnam (born 1946)
- Nguyễn Thị Bình, former NLF fighter and vice president of Vietnam (born 1927)
- Nguyễn Thiện Nhân, Vietnamese Minister of Education (1953–2015)
- Nguyễn Tiến Hưng (born 1935), former Minister of Economic Development and Planning of Republic of Vietnam, writer.
- Nguyễn Văn An (born 1937)
- Nguyễn Văn Linh, NLF fighter in the Vietnam War, 1986–1991 General Secretary of the Communist Party of Vietnam (1915–1998)
- Nguyễn Văn Tường, Nguyễn Dynasty regent (1824–1886)
- Nguyễn Văn Vy, ARVN general (1916–1981)
- Anna Nguyen (born 1990), German politician
- Bee Nguyen, Georgia state legislator (born 1981)
- Chi Nguyen, Canadian federal politician
- Daniel Nguyen, Oregon state legislator
- Duy Nguyen, Nevada state legislator
- Janet Nguyen (born 1976), California state legislator
- Joe Nguyen (born 1983), Washington state legislator
- Quang Nguyen, Arizona state legislator
- Rochelle Nguyen, Nevada state legislator (born 1977)
- Stephanie Nguyen, California state legislator (born 1979)
- Tram Nguyen, Massachusetts state legislator (born 1986)

== Religious leaders ==
- John-Baptiste Nguyễn Bửu Đồng (born Nguyễn Phước Bửu Đồng), Vietnamese Roman Catholic priest
- Thích Nhất Hạnh (born Nguyễn Xuân Bảo, 1926–2022), Buddhist monk and author
- Thadeus Nguyễn Văn Lý (born 1946), Roman Catholic priest and prominent Vietnamese dissident
- Antoine Nguyễn Văn Thiện, oldest bishop of the Roman Catholic Church (1906–2012)
- François-Xavier Cardinal Nguyễn Văn Thuận, Roman Catholic cardinal (1928–2002)

== Revolutionaries ==
- Nguyễn Hải Thần (c. 1878–1959)
- Cường Để (born Nguyễn Phúc Đan, 1882–1951), Nguyễn Dynasty prince
- Nguyễn Quyền, anti-colonial activist (1869–1941)
- Nguyễn Thái Học, Vietnamese revolutionary; founded the Nationalist Party of Vietnam (1901–1930)
- Nguyễn Thần Hiến, anti-colonial activist (1856–1914)
- Nguyễn Thượng Hiền, anti-colonial activist (1865–1925)
- Nguyễn Thị Định (1920–1992)
- Nguyễn Trung Trực, anti-French resistance leader (1837–1868)

== Scientists ==
- Prince Bửu Hội, organic/biochemistry/medical researcher, published more than 1000 papers (born Nguyễn Phúc Bửu Hội, 1915–1972)
- Nguyen Xuan Vinh (1930–2022)
- Nguyen Dinh Duc (b. 1963) composite material scientist

== Writers ==
- Nguyễn Đình Thi (1924–2003)
- Kien Nguyen (b. 1967)
- Nguyễn Nhật Ánh, popular children's author (b. 1955)
- Nguyễn Ngọc Ngạn, Vietnamese Canadian writer (b. 1946)
- Qui Nguyen, playwright
- Huong Keenleyside (born Nguyen Thi Huong in 1971)
- Nguyễn Thuyên, 13th century official and writer
- Viet Thanh Nguyen, Vietnamese American writer (b. 1971)

== Other ==
- Nguyễn Hữu Bài, minister to the royal court at Huế (1863–1935)
- Nguyễn Hữu Chánh, anti-communist activist (b. 1952)
- Nguyễn Huy Đẩu, anti-communist activist (1914–2008)
- James Nguyen, film director (b. 1966)
- JasonTheWeen, (born Jason Thanh Nguyen, 2004), Vietnamese-American Twitch streamer
- Nguyễn Khác Chính, anti-communist activist (1924–2016)
- Nguyễn Lạc Hoá, Catholic priest and anti-communist fighter (1908–c. 1989)
- Luke Nguyen, Australian chef, food writer and TV documentary host (b. 1978)
- Nguyễn Mạnh Tường, lawyer and intellectual (1909–1997)
- Paul Nguyễn Công Anh, Vietnamese-French Righteous Among the Nations (1919–2008)
- Peter Nguyen Van Hung, Catholic activist (b. 1958)
- Nguyễn Quang Hồng (1940–2025), lexicographer and scholar
- Nguyen Si Binh, anti-communist activist
- Tan Duc Thanh Nguyen, drug smuggler (1983–2018)
- Nguyễn Trường Tộ, 19th-century social reformer (1830–1871)
- Nguyễn Tường Vân, Vietnamese Australian drug trafficker (1980–2005)
- Nguyễn Văn Trỗi, would-be assassin of Robert McNamara (1947–1964)

== Fictional characters ==
- Nguyen Charlie, cartoon character
- Nguyen Toon, mythical North Vietnamese fighter pilot
- Pham Nuwen, of the science fiction novel A Fire Upon the Deep, is treated as a far-future descendant of the Nguyen surname.
- Diane Nguyen, a main character in BoJack Horseman
- Dong Nguyen, one of the title character's love interests in Unbreakable Kimmy Schmidt
- Tyler Nguyen-Baker, supporting character in Pixar's Turning Red
- Mrs. Nguyen, a character in Better Call Saul
- Jade Nguyen/Cheshire, a character from DC Comics
