= Nguyen Huu Chanh =

Vietnamese anti-communist activist

Nguyễn Hữu Chánh (Vietnamese pronunciation: [ŋwiən˦ˀ˥ hiw˦ˀ˥ t͡ɕajŋ̟˧˦]; born October 1, 1952) is the Vietnamese-American founder of anti-communist organization Government of Free Vietnam (GFVN), in which he served as its prime minister.

== Early life ==
=== Rebel years in Vietnam ===
In 1975, said to be a member of the "Bao Long Liberators", a democratic organization in Nha Trang, under the leadership of Nguyen Hoang Dan.

In 1982 he secretly fled Vietnam while being pursued by the Vietnamese government for his engagement in the weapon-smuggling activities. He later immigrated to the United States.

== Exile in the United States ==
In 1995, was selected by a members of the Government of Free Vietnam as Prime Minister, General Linh Quang Viên as Vice Prime Minister, Admiral Lâm Nguơn Tánh as Minister for Foreign Affairs, Mr. Nguyen Khac Chinh as the Minister of Information, Mr. Nguyễn Huy Đẩu as Minister of Justice, Nguyen Son Ha as Secretary of Foreign Affairs, Mr. Edgar Foshee as Chairman of the International Committee, and Mr. Ngô Trọng Anh as President of the advisory council.

In June 1999, the government of Vietnam police issued an international order to pursue Nguyen Huu Chanh for his role behind the terrorist attacks against Vietnamese embassies overseas as well as in Vietnam since 1995.

On January 2, 2005, he stepped down as Prime Minister of the Government of Free Vietnam when former head of state of South Vietnam Nguyễn Khánh was elected by delegates of the GFVN. Nguyen then took the helm as the chairmanship of the Walk Against Terror International, a new organisation tasked with combatting terrorism around the world.

== Detention in South Korea ==
On April 5, 2006, Nguyen Huu Chanh was detained by KNP police officers in Seoul, South Korea, because the Vietnamese government had made a request to the Korean authorities to detain Nguyen Huu Chanh for possible "charges of arms weapon trafficking and acts of terrorism".

Protests in support of Nguyen in Vietnamese and South Korean communities grew throughout the United States and in South Korea for his release. There was a petition presented to the South Korean court that had over 70,000 signatures in support of Nguyen's release.

Nguyen was released from custody at Uiwang, south of Seoul, on Thursday, July 27, 2006. The Seoul High Court rejected the Vietnamese request to hand over Chanh, whom the Vietnamese government accused of involvement in failed attempts to bomb its embassy in Thailand and state facilities in Vietnam, including a statue of founding leader Ho Chi Minh, between 1999 and 2001.

== Quotes ==
- "As we stand on these foreign shores, we shall never forget those suffering beyond the horizon."
- "Tyranny and Totalitarianism in any form must be terminated."
- "We are blessed by God to have the opportunity to live in freedom, to breathe freely. So it is our obligation, by the bond of our common humanity, that we give others who are less fortunate, to have the same opportunity as we do."
