= Free Vietnam =

Free Vietnam may refer to:

- Republic of Vietnam
- Government of Free Vietnam
- Third Republic of Vietnam
