= Keenleyside =

Keenleyside or Keenlyside is a surname that may refer to:

- Eric Keenleyside, (b. 1957), Canadian actor
- George Keenlyside (1889–1967), English footballer
- Hugh Llewellyn Keenleyside, CC (1898–1992), Canadian professor, diplomat and civil servant
  - for whom the Keenleyside Dam is named
- Huong Keenleyside, (née Nguyen), (b. 1971), Vietnamese writer
- Sir Simon Keenlyside, (b. 1959), British opera singer
  - Zenaida, Lady Keenlyside, ballet dancer, married to Sir Simon Keenlyside
- Tom Keenlyside, (b. 1950), Canadian musician
