= Foshee =

Foshee may refer to:

== People ==
- Douglas Foshee, American businessman
- Edgar Foshee, American military officer
- Eugene Crum Foshee (1937-2017), American politician
- Paul Foshee (1932–2020), American politician
- Taryn Foshee (born 1985), American beauty queen
- Thuong Nguyen Cuc Foshee, Vietnamese-American human rights activist

== Places ==
United States

- Foshee, Alabama
- Fosheeton, Alabama
