= Khmers Kampuchea-Krom Federation =

Non-profit organization of Khmer Krom in Vietnam

- សហព័ន្ធខ្មែរកម្ពុជាក្រោម
- Founded: 1985; 41 years ago
- Type: Non-profit NGO
- Purpose: Human rights activism self-determination
- Location: Pennsauken, New Jersey, U.S.
- Region served: Worldwide
- Key people: Vien Thach (Chairman); Sereivuth Prak (President)
- Website: Official website

The Khmers Kampuchea-Krom Federation (KKF; Khmer: សហព័ន្ធខ្មែរកម្ពុជាក្រោម, romanized: sahpnth khmer kampoucheakraom, Vietnamese: Liên đoàn Khmers Kampuchea-Krom) is an organization that self-declares as representing the indigenous Khmer Krom peoples living in the Mekong Delta of Vietnam. Its primary mission is to advocate for human rights, religious freedom, and self-determination, and independence through peaceful means and international laws.

== History ==
The organization was founded in 1985 when the First World Convention on Khmer Krom was held in New York City, US. It was later renamed the Khmers Kampuchea-Krom Federation (KKF) during the Fifth World Convention at Toronto, Canada in 1995.

== Leadership ==
The KKF's board of directors consists of a chairman, president, vice-president, chief of administration, senior council, representatives council, secretary, treasurer, director of planning, director of information, director of women, director of youth, director of education, and director of religious affairs. The board of directors is democratically elected every four years by members from around the world, including Australia, Cambodia, Canada, France, Italy, New Zealand, and the United States.

The president leads the executive committee and is responsible for the daily operations of the federation. KKF is also led by presidents of regional, continental, and local chapters.

== Membership ==
KKF has been a member of the Unrepresented Nations and Peoples Organization (UNPO) and the International Dragon Boat Federation (IDBF) since 2001 and the United Nations Department of Public Information (UN DPI) since 2015. The KKF has actively participated in the annual session of the United Nations Permanent Forum on Indigenous Issues (UNPFII) since 2004.

== Economy ==
KKF's budget consists of donations from Khmer-Krom exiles living in the United States, Canada, Australia, New Zealand, Europe, and sympathizers.

== Flag and logo ==
The Khmer Krom's flag was designed by KKF's first Chairman, Tan Dara Thach, in 1985. The flag has three colors: blue, yellow, and red, and its size is 3"by 5". Blue represents freedom and democracy, yellow represents Khmer-Krom who love peace and justice, and red represents Khmer-Krom's bravery and sacrifice for the fatherland.

The KKF's logo is called Rear Hoo Chap Chan, which is a depiction of a monster-like figure catching the moon (Chan in Khmer means ''moon''). According to Khmer folklore, this causes a lunar eclipse.

== See also ==
- Government of Free Vietnam
- Montagnard Foundation, Inc.
- People's Action Party of Vietnam
- Vietnamese Constitutional Monarchist League
- Viet Tan
- Nationalist Party of Greater Vietnam
