= Nguyễn Xuân Ngãi =

Vietnamese politician

Dr. Nguyễn Xuân Ngãi was born in South Vietnam. He is a Vietnamese American and serves as the Vice-Chairman of the People's Action Party of Vietnam.

== Biography ==
He had served in the Army of the Republic of Vietnam (ARVN) as a young Medical Officer at Nguyen Van Hoc Hospital in Saigon.

During the Fall of Saigon, Ngãi was a Medical Officer. He chose to remain and protect his patients at the hospital in Saigon instead of trying to move to the US like others.

On April 30, 1975, he was imprisoned by the Communist Vietnamese government for three years and was released. He secretly left Vietnam and immigrated to the United States.

In 2002, he was invited by the Vietnamese government Public Health Ministry, to teach Vietnamese doctors the techniques of angioplasty and angiograms.

Dr. Ngãi's work was praised within the medical field in Vietnam and was reported by media networks throughout Vietnam. This alarmed the Vietnamese Communist when news spread throughout the media that Dr. Ngãi was also involved with an opposition organization known as the People's Action Party of Vietnam.

On March 1, 2002, Communist Police arrived at his hotel in Saigon and seized his passport, visa and airplane ticket. He was accused of having tried to overthrow the Vietnamese Communist government, a crime that can carry the death penalty.

There was an outcry by the Vietnamese community in the United States and after one week he was eventually released and allowed to return to the United States.
