= Colonel Tomb =

Mythical North Vietnamese flying ace

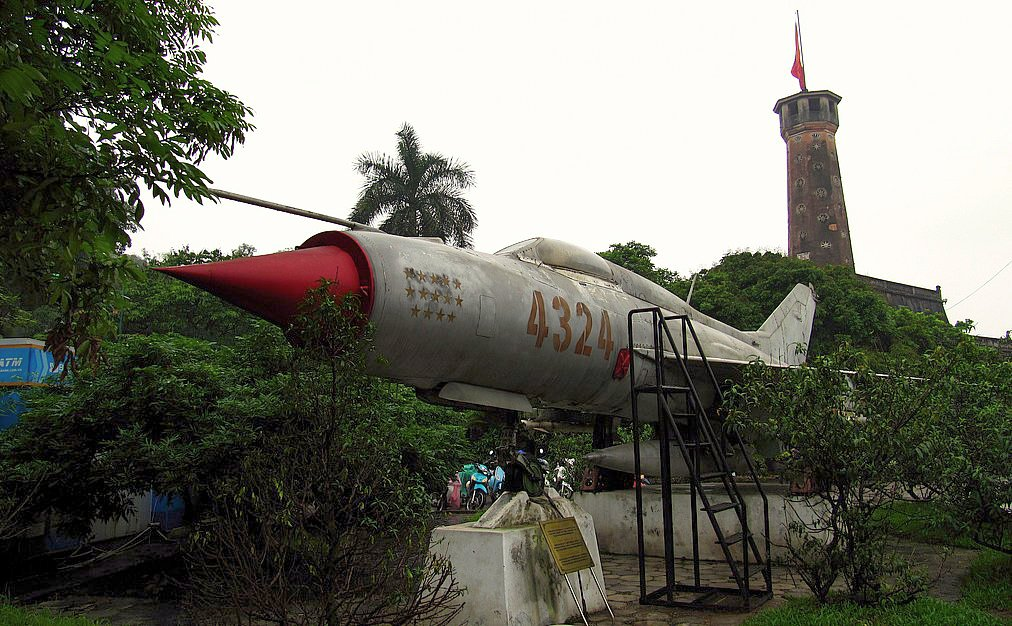
The MIG-21 N. 4324 of the Vietnam People's Air Force. This fighter aircraft, flown by various pilots, was credited with 14 kills during the Vietnam War.

Colonel Tomb, also Nguyen Toon (Nguyễn Tuân) or Colonel Toon was a mythical North Vietnam Air Force fighter ace loosely based on a North Vietnamese pilot from the 921st Fighter Regiment named Nguyen Van Coc. Tomb allegedly shot down 13 American aircraft during the Vietnam War. According to legend, he was killed in action on May 10, 1972, by the U.S. Navy F-4 Phantom crew of pilot Lt. Randy "Duke" Cunningham and radar operator Lt.(jg) William "Irish" Driscoll. It was later revealed by historians that there had been no such colonel in the North Vietnam forces.

The name "Colonel Tomb" rose to prominence among U.S. Navy aviators during the latter part of the war. Photos of a North Vietnamese MiG-17 with the tail number 3020 bearing numerous red victory stars contributed to the rumor, and was occasionally identified as the Colonel's aircraft. However, it was normal practice in the Vietnamese People's Air Force to add victory stars to an aircraft for all claims in the aircraft, regardless of the pilot flying it. A photo of a MiG-21, with tail number 4326, was reported in a Vietnamese official magazine to have been flown by at least nine different airmen. This aircraft also had numerous red victory stars. Six of its pilots received the title "Hero of the People's Armed Forces". Information on Toon/Tomb's life and career was never published by the North Vietnamese, nor did they release a photo of him. MiG-17 number 3020 was confirmed shot down and destroyed, on May 10, 1972, by Cunningham and Driscoll following a protracted air fight.

Much of the information the U.S. obtained about the North Vietnamese air force came from radio signals intelligence or "SigInt", which monitored enemy radio transmissions. Though Tuân is a Vietnamese name, Toon and Tomb are not. It is likely that a name similar in sound to Tomb was used as a radio callsign, and was responsible for the creation of the story of a Colonel Tomb. Complex psychological factors have also contributed to the creation of the story of the epic aerial duel against the alleged high-ranking Vietnamese fighter ace and his demise.

== May 10, 1972, by VPAF records ==
The 'MiG-17F' no. 3020 was a license-made Shenyang J-5 attached to the VPAF's 923rd Fighter Regiment, and was flown by at least two of the six VPAF's MiG-17 fighter aces, including Nguyễn Văn Bảy and Lê Hải; both of whom survived the war, with Lê retiring as a Senior Colonel. Like all combat-ready VPAF MiG-17s, these were painted a green and brown camouflage by 1967, and were affectionately called con rắn (snakes) by their ground crew. The beginning of the Operation Linebacker air interdiction campaign against North Vietnam in May 1972 proved to be especially bloody for both sides of the air war; four of the 923rd FR's MiG-17s were dispatched against a large strike-force of A-6 Intruders, A-7 Corsairs IIs and F-4 Phantom IIs targeting the bridges around Hải Dương on 10 May 1972. Although outnumbered, the VPAF pilots attacked the strike-force, and in the ensuing melee, MiG-17 pilot Do Hang was shot down by AIM-9 Sidewinder missiles fired from Lt. Duke Cunningham/Lt.(jg) Willy Driscoll's F-4. Two more MiG-17s were shot-down by the F-4s of Lt. Cunningham/Lt.(jg) Driscoll and Lt. Connelly III/Lt. Blonski, and pilot Tra Van Kiem was KIA, while Nguyen Van Tho bailed out and survived and the MiG-17 piloted by Ta Dong Trung, who pursued the A-7s out to sea without scoring any hits, was able to return to base.

The F-4s however, now flying about 10 km north of Hải Dương, were intercepted by a pair of MiG-21MFs piloted by Vu Duc Hop and Le Thanh Dao of the new 927th FR whom were effectively vectored by GCI against the Phantoms; Vu Duc Hop and Le Thanh Dao each firing R-3S "Atoll" missiles at their selected targets, had found their marks respectively against the F-4s of Lt. Cunningham/Lt.jg Driscoll and Cdr. Blackburn/Lt. Rudloff, and while Cunningham/Driscoll were able eject out at sea where they were rescued, Blackburn/Rudloff were seen to have successfully ejected from their stricken Phantom by the Americans, and while their parachutes were observed to have gone down over land, only Lt. Rudloff was ever on the POW manifest by North Vietnamese records. The remains of Cdr. Harry L. Blackburn were returned to the Americans on 10 April 1986 and positively identified as his later that year.

== Notable USAF/USN and VPAF losses/victories on 10 May 1972 ==
List of notable kills/losses of the air battles of this day in the Vietnam War.

Crew member(s)	Service/Unit	Kills/Total	Status
Lt. R.H. Cunningham / Lt.(jg) Willy Driscoll, F-4	USN	2 kills (the MiG-17s of Do and Nguyen or Tra)/5 total	Shot down/rescued
Lt. M. Connelly III / Lt. J.T. Blonski, F-4	USN	1 kill (the MiG-17 of Nguyen or Tra)/2 total	
Cdr. H.L. Blackburn / Lt. S. Rudloff, F-4	USN		Cdr. Blackburn (KIA)/Lt. Rudloff (POW)
Do Hang, MiG-17	VPAF		KIA (strafed to death while descending under parachute after ejection)
Le Thanh Dao, MiG-21	VPAF	1 kill (F-4 of Blackburn/Rudloff)/6 total	
Vu Duc Hop, MiG-21	VPAF	1 kill (F-4 of Cunningham/Driscoll)	
Maj. R. Lodge / Capt. R. Locher, F-4	USAF	3 kills/3 total	Maj. Lodge (KIA)/Capt. Locher (rescued)
Capt. J.L. Harris / Capt. D.E. Wilkinson, F-4	USAF		Capt. Harris (KIA)/Capt. Wilkinson (KIA)
Dang Ngoc Ngu, MiG-21	VPAF	1 kill/7 total	(KIA, 8 July 1972)
Nguyen Van Phuc, MiG-19	VPAF	1 kill (F-4 of Lodge/Locher)	
Le Van Tuong, MiG-19	VPAF	1 kill (F-4 of Harris/Wilkinson)	KIA (landing accident)
Cao Son Khao, MiG-19	VPAF	1 kill	KIA (FF)

== In mainstream media ==
The story of the epic aerial combat duel between North Vietnamese MiG-17 pilot Colonel Tomb and the American F-4 crew of Lt. Randy "Duke" Cunningham and Lt.(jg) William P. Driscoll was popularly featured with CGI-based reenactment of the battle scenes on The History Channel in the premiere episode of the 2006 television series Dogfights.

"I could see a Gomer leather helmet, Gomer goggles, Gomer scarf...and his intent Gomer expression... I began to feel numb. My stomach grabbed at me in knots. There was no fear in this guy's eyes as we zoomed some 8000 feet straight up."

— Lt. Randy "Duke" Cunningham, describing his canopy-to-canopy encounter with Colonel Tomb in the pilot episode of Dogfights and in his combat memoirs of May 10, 1972

The re-enactments of the duel between the high-ranked Vietnamese MiG-17 fighter pilot and F-4 Phantom II crew of Lt. Cunningham and Lt.(jg) Driscoll on The History Channel's Dogfights ended the segment with the claim that "a SAM did what no Vietnamese fighter pilot could do; shoot down the F-4" of Lt. Cunningham/Lt.(jg) Driscoll.

== See also ==
- Apache (Viet Cong soldier)
- List of Vietnam War flying aces
- Vietnam People's Air Force
- Nguyễn Văn Cốc
- Ghost of Kyiv, an unidentified Ukrainian flying ace later acknowledged as a myth
