= Thuong Nguyen Cuc Foshee =

Vietnamese American

Thuong Nguyen Cuc Foshee (Vietnamese: Thương Nguyễn Cúc Foshee) is a Vietnamese American who was held without formal charge by the government of Vietnam after her arrest in September 2005 on accusations of plotting to broadcast anti-communist radio messages under the direction of Government of Free Vietnam (GFVN), an anti-government group. She is divorced from GFVN representative Edgar Foshee. Their daughter Elizabeth McCausland, a lawyer, actively campaigned for her mother's freedom politically through United States government officials. Ms. Foshee was ultimately arrested and charged with conducting terrorist activities and went on trial November 10, 2006. She, along with six other defendants, was convicted and sentenced to 15 months with credit for time served.

== Early release ==
Ms. Foshee had already been in prison for 14 months before her trial. But she was released four weeks early, reportedly after she wrote to the authorities asking to return to her family for medical care. A court official told the Associated Press that she suffered from high blood pressure and heart problems. Her brother told reporters that he had taken her to Ho Chi Minh City airport as soon as she was released for a flight back to the United States.

== See also ==
- Cong Thanh Do
