= Ngo Trong Anh =

Ngô Trọng Anh (born 26 November 1926) was a Vietnamese civil servant. Born in Huế, he served in the Republic of Vietnam (RVN) administration as Minister of Transportation and Public Works 1965-1966 and as Secretary of State, Founder of the National Supervisory Institute in 1966. He was Vice-President of Van Hanh University in Saigon, 1965-1975.

After being jailed for three years he was under house arrest for six years by the communist government for his anti-communist political activities. With the intervention of the ODP (Orderly Departure Program) he immigrated to the United States in November 1984. Since 1995, he has served as President of the National Security Council and as Chairman of the National Advisory Council of an exiled anti-communist organization known as The Government of Free Vietnam.

== Honour ==
=== Foreign honour ===
- Malaysia : Honorary Commander of the Order of the Defender of the Realm (P.M.N.) (1965)
