= Owen J. Baggett =

United States Air Force officer (1920–2006)

Owen John Baggett
- Born: August 29, 1920; Graham, Texas, U.S.
- Died: July 27, 2006 (aged 85); New Braunfels, Texas, U.S.
- Military career
- Allegiance: United States of America
- Branch: United States Air Force
- Service years: 1942–1973
- Rank: Colonel
- Unit: 9th Bomb Squadron
- Conflicts: World War II; Korean War
- Awards: Prisoner of War Medal

Owen John Baggett (August 29, 1920 – July 27, 2006) was a second lieutenant in the United States 7th Bomb Group based at Pandaveswar, Bengal Province, British India, during the Second World War.

== Early life ==
Baggett was born in Graham, Texas, in 1920. He graduated from Hardin–Simmons University in 1941, where he was the band's drum major. After graduation, he was employed as a defense contractor on Wall Street.

== Military service ==
Baggett enlisted in the Army Air Forces and graduated from pilot training on July 26, 1942, at the New Columbus Army Flying School.

On March 31, 1943, while stationed in British India, Baggett's squadron, part of the 7th Bombardment Group, was ordered to destroy a bridge at Pyinmana, Burma. Before reaching their target, the 12 B-24s of 7th BG were intercepted by 13 Ki-43 fighters of 64 Sentai IJAAS. Baggett's plane was severely damaged and was set on fire by several hits to the fuel tanks. The crew was forced to bail out, escaping the crippled B-24 only seconds before it exploded. The Japanese pilots then began attacking U.S. airmen as they parachuted to earth. Two of the crewmen were killed in the air, though contrary to some reports that the pilot, Lloyd K. Jensen (1920–1994) was "summarily executed", Jensen did survive the war. Baggett, who had been wounded, decided to play dead, hoping the enemy pilots would ignore him. Nevertheless, one Ki-43 flew close to Baggett and slowed to make sure. Baggett saw the pilot open his canopy and decided to take a chance. He drew his .45 caliber M1911 pistol and fired four shots at the pilot. He then watched as the plane stalled and plunged toward the ground.

Baggett later gained fame as the only person ever to shoot down an aircraft using a pistol, though this is contradicted by Japanese wartime records, which indicate that no Japanese planes were lost during this action. Presumably, the Japanese pilot (wounded or not) regained control of his aircraft and flew it back to his airfield or the event never took place; Baggett landed and was immediately captured by Japanese soldiers on the ground. He remained a prisoner of the Japanese for the rest of the war. Baggett and 37 other POWs were liberated at the war's end by eight OSS agents who parachuted into Singapore.

While he was assigned to Mitchel Air Force Base, Baggett was noted for his work with children, including sponsoring a boy and a girl to be commander for a day. Baggett retired from the Air Force as a colonel in 1973 and later worked as a defense contractor manager for Litton.
