= Attacks on parachutists =

Aspect of the Law of War

Attacks on parachutists, as defined by the law of war, occur when pilots, aircrew, and passengers are attacked while descending by parachute from disabled aircraft during wartime. Such parachutists are considered hors de combat and it is made a war crime to attack them in an interstate armed conflict under Additional Protocol I to the 1949 Geneva Conventions. However, firing on airborne forces who are descending by parachute (i.e. paratroopers) is not prohibited.

== International humanitarian law ==
After World War I, a series of meetings were held at The Hague in 1922–1923. Based on the testimony of First World War pilots, a commission of jurists attempted to codify this practice with the Hague Rules of Air Warfare, which, like most law of war treaties at the time, was applicable to interstate armed conflict. Article 20 prescribed that:

When an aircraft has been disabled, the occupants when endeavoring to escape by means of parachute must not be attacked in the course of their descent.

The Hague Rules of Air Warfare never came into force. There was no legal prohibition of targeting parachuting enemy airmen before or during World War II. In 1949, as a result of widespread practices and abuses committed during World War II, the newly modified and updated versions of the Geneva Conventions came into force providing greater protections to protected persons, but there was still no explicit prohibition on the shooting of parachuting enemy combatants outside of their airborne duties. However, despite this, military manuals around the world issued prohibitions on attacking enemy aircrew parachuting from aircraft in distress. Paragraph 30 of the United States Army's Field Manual published by the Department of the Army, on 18 July 1956 (last modified on 15 July 1976), under the title "The Law of Land Warfare", states:

30. Persons Descending by Parachute

The law of war does not prohibit firing upon paratroopers or other persons who are or appear to be bound upon hostile missions while such persons are descending by parachute. Persons other than those mentioned in the preceding sentence who are descending by parachute from disabled aircraft may not be fired upon.

In 1977, this practice was finally outlawed in an interstate armed conflict by Additional Protocol I to the 1949 Geneva Conventions:

Article 42 – Occupants of aircraft

1. No person parachuting from an aircraft in distress shall be made the object of attack during his descent.
2. Upon reaching the ground in territory controlled by an adverse Party, a person who has parachuted from an aircraft in distress shall be given an opportunity to surrender before being made the object of attack, unless it is apparent that he is engaging in a hostile act.
3. Airborne troops are not protected by this Article.

However, there is no international humanitarian law prohibiting such practice in a non-interstate conflict. The International Committee of the Red Cross (ICRC) alleges in its Rule 48 study that attacking parachutists is prohibited by Common Article 3 of the 1949 Geneva Conventions, yet acknowledges in its 2020 commentary "it does not in itself provide rules governing the conduct of hostilities." The phrase "treated humanely" implies that a person hors de combat must be under physical control to receive protection under Common Article 3. Also, most of the military manuals cited in the Rule 48 study stems from the context of interstate armed conflict, therefore failing to satisfy the prohibition under customary international humanitarian law (which requires both state practice and opinio juris).

== First World War ==
Targeting parachutists became an issue during the First World War when fighter pilots targeted manned enemy observation balloons. After shooting down a balloon, most pilots refrained from firing at the balloon observers as they escaped by parachute, because they felt it was inhumane and unchivalrous. The extension of this courtesy to enemy pilots began towards the end of the First World War when parachutes were provided for pilots of fixed-wing aircraft, but it was again widely perceived that once aircrew were forced to bail out of a damaged aircraft, presuming they did not offer any further resistance, they were considered to have been honorably defeated in battle and should not be "finished off".

By July 1918, German and Austro-Hungarian Air Force parachute escapes had become routine. The Heinecke chutes that German and Austro-Hungarian pilots received were not perfect and sometimes failed to operate safely. Some were destroyed by fire before they could open, and occasionally pilots faced the peril of being shot at by Entente fighters. British flying ace James Ira T. Jones had no compunction in doing this. "My habit of attacking Huns dangling from parachutes led to many arguments in the mess," he said. "Some officers of the Eton and Sandhurst type thought it 'unsportsmanlike'. Never having been to a public school, I was unhampered by such considerations of 'form'. I just pointed out that there was a bloody war on, and that I intended to avenge my pals."

== Second World War ==
=== War in Europe ===
At the beginning of World War II, there was a strong sense of chivalry between the British RAF and German Luftwaffe pilots. They regarded themselves as "knights of the air" and shooting parachuting enemy aircrew was contrary to their code of honour. The question of shooting an enemy pilot parachuting over his own territory aroused bitter debate on both sides. On 31 August 1940, during the Battle of Britain, RAF Air Chief Marshal Hugh Dowding dined with Prime Minister Winston Churchill at Chequers. After dinner, they discussed the morality of shooting parachuting Luftwaffe pilots. Dowding suggested that German pilots were perfectly entitled to shoot RAF pilots parachuting over Britain as they were still potential combatants (i.e., piloting new aircraft to conduct another military mission) while RAF pilots should refrain from firing at German pilots as they were out of combat and would eventually become prisoners of war once they landed on British soil. Churchill was appalled by this suggestion, arguing that shooting a parachuting pilot "was like drowning a sailor".

On the German side, Luftwaffe commander-in-chief Hermann Göring asked Luftwaffe fighter ace Adolf Galland about what he thought about shooting enemy pilots while in their parachutes, even over their own territory. Galland replied that, "I should regard it as murder, Herr Reichsmarschall. I should do everything in my power to disobey such an order."

Despite such sentiments, there were a number of incidents where the shooting of parachuting enemy aviators occurred. On 1 September 1939, in the Modlin area, during the German invasion of Poland, pilots of the Polish Pursuit Brigade encountered a group of 40 German bombers escorted by 20 Bf 109 and Bf 110 fighters. During combat, Lt. Aleksander Gabszewicz was forced to bail out of his aircraft. While in his parachute, Gabszewicz was shot at by a Bf 110. Second Lt. Tadeusz Sawicz, flying nearby, attacked the German plane and another Polish pilot, Wladyslaw Kiedrzynski, spiraled around the defenseless Gabszewicz until he reached the ground. On 2 September, Sec. Lt. Jan Dzwonek, along with eight other Polish pilots, attacked a couple of German fighters approaching their direction. In the battle, Dzwonek's plane was shot down and he was forced to bail out. Hanging in his parachute, he was attacked twice by a Bf 110. Apparently, the Luftwaffe pilot was so busy attacking the defenseless Dzwonek that Corporal Jan Malinowski, flying an obsolete P.7 fighter, downed the German plane. Dzwonek later recounted the story:

I was hanging in the chute at about 2000 meters altitude when I noticed tracers passing near to me. They missed, but this pirate of the Third Reich did not give up and attacked me again. This second time the wave of bullets also spared me. Shells passed to the left and right of my body. The German didn't get a third chance to kill me because my friend Jan Malinowski from 162nd Escadrille (flew on P.7a!) successfully attacked the German. On the first attack he set the right engine of the Bf 110 on fire, and on the second pass killed the pilot. The aircraft fell, crashing in pieces. During my landing I damaged my backbone. I was transported to the hospital in Pabianice, where I heard someone say I had no chance to see next sunrise. I did go into a coma for 20 hours. When I awakened, the doctor told me, that in the same hospital was a Bf 110 pilot – the one I downed.

During the Battle of Britain, Polish and Czech pilots serving in the RAF sometimes shot at Luftwaffe pilots parachuting over Britain. Many Germans charged that this was regular practice by the Poles and the Czechs, but there was little hard evidence of it. The leading historian of the Polish Air Force, Adam Zamoyski, conceded that "it is true that some pilots still finished off parachuting Germans by flying directly over them; the slipstream would cause the parachute to collapse and the man would fall into the ground like a stone."

On 8 March 1944, USAAF Lt. Virgil K. Meroney and his Blue Flight were at the rear of 352d Fighter Group as it reached the end of its escort leg. The group turned to leave as they crossed the Dutch border into Germany near Meppen. "Three Me 109s came out of the sun with a lot of speed and made a 90-degree attack on the rear bombers, breaking away in rolls," Meroney recalled. "I called them in and went after the lead two as they stayed together, the third having broken in a different direction." Meroney drove his P-47 along with his squadron to attack the Germans who were trying to shoot down the USAAF B-17 heavy bombers and fired at the German planes. When the German pilot realized that his Bf 109 was badly in flames, he jumped out of his plane and opened his parachute. Meroney and his squadron did not fire at the German pilot who was parachuting safely back to earth. This might have been because he and his flight were low on fuel and there was no knowing if there were other enemy aircraft in the area. Indeed, that more pilots and aircrew were not shot in their parachutes was probably due at least in part to the nature of aerial combat. The fights were a confusing whirl and a pilot who concentrated too long and hard on killing a man in a parachute could easily fall prey himself and end up in the position of being shot up while in his parachute. Not shooting enemy pilots in their parachutes was a practical matter as well as a chivalrous one.

Still, both German and American pilots did shoot enemy airmen in their parachutes, albeit infrequently. Richard "Bud" Peterson, a P-51 pilot with the 357th Fighter Group, based in Leiston, agreed that "normally, nobody, including the Germans, would be shooting anybody in a parachute. It just wasn't done. I mean, there's no challenge with shooting a guy in a parachute, for God's sake." However, on one mission he saw a Bf 109 systematically firing at American B-17 bomber crews as they descended in their parachutes. After Peterson forced the offending German pilot to bail out, he killed him as he was descending. He recalled that some of his unit were nervous that this would invite a retaliatory response from the Luftwaffe. "But they had to be there to know what I was seeing," Peterson said. "Those guys were helpless, the bomber crews going down".

Several German sources (examples below) claim that American pilots frequently practised shooting at parachutes, especially closer to the end of the war when Germany had more planes than pilots:

Gefr. Hans Thran bailed out successfully but, according to ground witnesses, was shot in his parachute by a P-47 pilot while only sixty feet above the ground. German pilots had a fear of being killed while hanging helpless in their parachutes, and every such report was investigated and carefully documented. These incidents were especially common during the summer and autumn of 1944.

Hofmann gave this advice to his pilots: If you ever have to bail out, remember that the Americans are known to shoot us in our parachutes. Therefore, free-fall to about 200 meters; only that way can you be sure of survival. I have seen one of my best friends torn to bits by enemy cannon fire while still hanging in his chute.

Shooting jet pilots in their parachutes was justified by some as a necessary evil. It was believed that these pilots were a special elite and that training them to fly such aircraft was a protracted and expensive effort. This logic held that killing such men whenever possible could help shorten the war. For their part, many German pilots were so concerned about being attacked in their parachutes that they waited until they were at low altitude before pulling their ripcords.

On 4 April, Rudolf Sinner led seven other Me 262s off from Rechlin. Emerging from the clouds shortly after take-off, the flight was bounced by P-51 fighters of the 339th Fighter Group, USAAF. In the ensuing combat "Rudi" Sinner's aircraft was hit. With his face and hands badly burned, he bailed out at low level. His parachute deployed at the last moment, but did not completely fill, and he was hanging by just the left strap when he hit the ground heavily in a ploughed field and dragged into a barbed wire fence. He reported that the P-51s then strafed him, but he feigned death and, as the P-51s departed, made his way to the safety of a deep furrow.

With a little course correction, he is in my crosshairs and I fire: the Mustang shows a white trail and makes a turn downwards. But at the same time, the pilot in the other Mustang has me in his crosshairs and fires. I notice that my bird has become uncontrollable, jettison the canopy, unbuckle and get out. To my horror. I notice that we are really, very low – will my chute open in time? I immediately pull my ripcord – the chute opens – I am just over some woods, see a Mustang flying towards me, it shoots at me.

I have arrived in the tops of some trees and finally hang suspended between the branches. I turn the buckle on my harness, leave my chute in the trees and climb down using some branches. Already the first people arrive at the scene. They have seen the dogfight and have also seen that the Mustang fired at me in my chute.

Thaen Kwock Lee was a B-17 waist gunner with the 483rd Bomb Group, a 15th Air Force unit, when his aircraft was shot down by German Me 262s on 22 March 1945. He recalled that he and his crew bailed out in their parachutes and while descending back to earth, they were attacked by Me 262s:

Three fighters came after me. The first one missed and the second also missed. When the third one came by I was too low for him to shoot at me. When I hit the ground a burst of machine gun was fired at me. I hit the dirt fast. Then German soldiers came and drove me on a motorcycle to a building. On the way we passed a row of dead American airmen, about twelve of them covered with blood soaked parachutes. I knew they were shot dead on the way down.

USAAF pilot Stanley Miles shared his experience on 13 May 1944, when the 352nd encountered a massive formation of enemy fighters. After getting involved in a dogfight with one of the German planes for a while, Miles shot down the plane, which caused the German pilot to bail out in his parachute. "I had my gun camera running," he recalled, "so I got some good shots of the tracers hitting the plane and the pilot jumping out. My wing-man was still with me, so I eased around, came back and got some nice film footage of the German pilot in his chute." Miles considered shooting the enemy pilot as he drifted helplessly back to earth. It was a topic that he and his squadron units had considered in earnest. "One school of thought was that if you didn't shoot the guy, he'd land and be right back up fighting you the next day. I couldn't do it, however, and just took the film footage of him."

Most American pilots used gun cameras to ensure they had adequate proof of their victories. Robert O' Nan of the 487th Fighter Squadron did this on 10 April 1944, after forcing a Focke-Wulf Fw 190 pilot to abandon his aircraft: "I followed the plane down where it crashed, exploded, and burned up, in the middle of a plowed field. I took pictures of this. I also got pictures of the pilot dangling in his chute." None of them were considering shooting German pilots hanging in their parachutes.

U.S. General Dwight D. Eisenhower, Supreme Commander of the Allied Forces in Europe, felt compelled to specifically forbid the practice. In the directive issued to U.S. Major General Carl Spaatz, commander of the United States Strategic Air Forces in Europe, and British Air Chief Marshal Arthur Tedder (or Sir Arthur Harris according to D-Day Bombers: The Veterans' Story: RAF Bomber Command and the US Eighth Air Force Support to the Normandy Invasion 1944 by Stephen Darlow) on 2 June 1944, in a preparation for Operation Overlord, he wrote:

During current and future intensive air operations, Allied airmen are required by their duty to fly and fight continuously over enemy and occupied territories of Europe. The enemy who is fearful of these attacks because of their devastating effect of his transport and the morale of his troops, is endeavouring to prevent them by propaganda designed to prove to the peoples of Europe that Allied airmen are wilfully shooting up harmless civilians in the course of their fighter sweeps and tactical bombing attacks. It is essential to remember that much of the air fighting will take place over the heads of friendly people, who have endured the savagery of the Germans for years. Humanity and the principles for which we fight demand from our pilots scrupulous care to avoid any but military targets. The Air Forces of the United Nations are privileged to be the spearhead of the forces fighting for freedom and the herald to the oppressed peoples of Europe of our approach. Be careful that nothing is done to betray this trust or to prejudice our good name in the eyes of our friends still dominated by Nazi tyranny. I request that those instructions be brought to the attention of every member of aircrews fighting over Europe. I would add that similar considerations apply to enemy airmen compelled to escape by parachute. Such personnel are not legitimate military targets, and may not be deliberately attacked.

There were episodes of shooting parachuting aircrew in the Mediterranean theater: on 2 October 1942, Captain Livio Ceccotti of the Regia Aeronautica was engaged by five Allied fighters, reportedly Spitfires, and after a dogfight in which two Spitfires were reportedly downed by him he was hit and forced to bail out from his Macchi C.202 fighter; as he was descending, he was reportedly shot at and killed by the surviving three fighters.

=== War in Asia and the Pacific ===
While World War II began in Asia with the start of the full-scale war between China and the Empire of Japan, the Japanese gained a bad reputation among the Allies in the war in Asia and the Pacific for shooting enemy airmen dangling in their parachutes. The first confirmed case was over the Chinese city of Battle of Nanjing on 19 September 1937, during the Second Sino-Japanese War, when Chinese pilot Lt. Liu Lanqing (劉蘭清) of the 17th Pursuit Squadron, 3rd Pursuit Group flying P-26 Model 281 fighters, bailed out in his parachute after being shot down by IJNAS aircraft. Hanging in his parachute, he was killed after being shot by Japanese pilots; Lt. Liu's squadron leader Capt. John Huang Xinrui tried fighting off the Japanese pilots taking turns shooting at Lt. Liu, but was shot down and had to bail out himself; he waited until the last possible moment to tug his parachute cord. Pilots from both the IJNAS and IJAAS did this routinely throughout the war. As a result, Chinese and Russian volunteer pilots delayed opening their parachutes to avoid being shot at. Even after a safe parachute descent, the Japanese still went after them. In July 1938, one Russian volunteer, Valentin Dudonov, bailed out in his parachute and landed on a sand bank in Lake Poyang after a collision with an IJNAS A5M aircraft. Another A5M aircraft came and strafed him on the sand bank. Dudonov had to jump and hide under water in the lake to avoid being attacked. One of Japan's top fighter aces, Tetsuzō Iwamoto, was summoned twice to Douglas MacArthur's Allied GHQ office in Tokyo for questioning about attacks on pilots who have bailed out of their aircraft in China and the Pacific War, but was cleared of war crime charges.

On 23 December 1941, 12 P-40 pilots of the American Volunteer Group (AVG) Flying Tigers intercepted 54 Japanese bombers escorted by 20 pursuit planes, who were bombing the city of Rangoon in Burma. During the battle, the AVG downed five Japanese bombers with the loss of two P-40 pilots. P-40 pilot Paul J. Greene's plane was badly damaged, which forced him to bail out. He was shot at by Japanese fighters while descending to earth in his parachute, but survived. "You want to see my 'chute," he told Daily Express war correspondent O.D. Gallagher. "It's got more holes in it than the nose of a watering-can."

On 23 January 1942, the AVG attacked Japanese bombers and fighters which had resumed carrying out bombing raids on Rangoon. The AVG shot down 21, suffering only a single loss of a pilot named Bert Christman. During the dogfight, Christman's plane was damaged and he was forced to bail out. While parachuting over the rice paddies south of Rangoon, he was killed by three IJAAS Nakajima aircraft.

On 20th February 1942, an American navy fighter pilot engaged in strafing the survivors of a ditched Japanese bomber during the action off-Bougainville.

In June 1942, as part of the Japanese Midway operation, the Japanese attacked the Aleutian islands, off the south coast of Alaska. Tadayoshi Koga, a 19-year-old flight petty officer first class, was launched from the Japanese aircraft carrier Ryūjō as part of the 4 June raid. Koga was part of a three-plane section. His wingmen were Chief Petty Officer Makoto Endo and Petty Officer Tsuguo Shikada. Koga and his comrades attacked Dutch Harbor, shooting down an American PBY-5A Catalina flying boat piloted by Bud Mitchell and strafing its survivors in the water. Three successive attacks killed the PBY's crew. Koga was then killed when his damaged aircraft crash-landed on the island of Akutan.

During the Malayan Campaign in 1942, Japanese pilots often shot British, Commonwealth, and Dutch airmen hanging in their parachutes. Australian pilot Herb Plenty witnessed a Dutch Brewster aircraft being shot down by Japanese fighters and the pilot bailed out in his parachute on 17 January 1942, near Bilton Island, some miles of Singapore. He also said that while most Japanese fighters were heading back to their own bases, two of them came back and shot the parachuting Dutch pilot:

But two Japanese pilots, in a parting gesture of hate, dived towards the descending parachute and poured long bursts of gunfire at the Brewster pilot swinging helplessly in the canopy rigging. A concerted and immediate growl of rage rose from most of us, conveying our feelings that the Japanese pilots had just perpetrated an act amounting to unfair tactics, treachery, and an outrageous course of conduct. Previously, among British and German pilots, an unwritten code of honour – chivalry, if you like – assumed that pilots descending by parachute should not be shot at by opposing aircraft. The Japanese served notice that they held no such gentlemanly opinions.

During the Battle of the Bismarck Sea, where Allied planes attacked a Japanese convoy of destroyers and troop transports, one Allied sortie on 3 March 1943 consisting of B-17 bombers escorted by P-38 fighters was intercepted by Japanese Mitsubishi A6M Zero fighters. The A6M Zeros fatally crippled one of the B-17s, forcing its crew to bail out, then Japanese fighter pilots machine-gunned some of the crew as they descended and attacked others in the water after they landed. Five of the Japanese fighters strafing the B-17 aircrew were promptly engaged and shot down by three P-38s which were also lost. On the evenings of 3–5 March, PT boats and planes attacked Japanese rescue vessels, as well as the survivors from the sunken vessels on life rafts and swimming or floating in the sea. This was later justified on the grounds that rescued servicemen would have been rapidly landed at their military destination and promptly returned to active service, as well as being retaliation for the Japanese fighter planes attacking survivors of the downed B-17 bomber. While many of the Allied aircrew accepted these attacks as being necessary, others were sickened.

On 31 March 1943, a squadron of USAAF B-24 bombers sent to destroy a bridge at Pyinmana, Burma, were attacked by Japanese Zero fighters. One B-24 aircraft was shot down and its occupants, including 2nd Lt Owen J. Baggett, bailed out. While the downed B-24 crew members were descending, they were machine gunned by Japanese fighters. Two of the crewmen were killed and Baggett was wounded in the arm. He then played dead in his harness, hoping the Japanese would leave him alone. One Japanese plane, however, circled and approached very close to Baggett to make sure he was dead. Baggett raised his M1911 pistol and fired four shots into the cockpit, hitting the pilot; the Zero stalled and crashed. Baggett became legendary as the only person to have downed a Japanese aircraft with a M1911 pistol. The aircraft engaged were Ki 43 Hayabusa, a smaller aircraft that was often mistaken as the Zero due to its similar shape.

On 15 September 1943, seven B-24s of the 373d Bombardment Squadron, 308th Bombardment Group, based at Yangkai Airfield were dispatched to attack a Vichy French cement plant in Haiphong, a major port on the Gulf of Tonkin, that had just been turned over to the Japanese – though not without resistance – from Governor-General of French Indochina, Jean Decoux. Two B-24s, however, broke down while attempting to take off from Yangkai Airfield so the five remaining planes continued the mission. When the five B-24s reached Haiphong, they were attacked by Japanese fighters. One plane went down, forcing the other planes to abandon the mission as they were continuously attacked. Two more planes went down and forced the aircrew to bail out. The Japanese pilots then went after one of the B-24 plane's parachutists and fired at them while they were descending to the ground, killing three and wounding three others. The other two B-24 planes escaped severe damage and returned to Yangkai Airfield (one plane, however, crashed at the airfield, killing the entire crew).

On 5 May 1945, an American Boeing B-29 Superfortress bomber was flying with a dozen other aircraft after bombing Tachiarai Air Base in southwestern Japan, beginning the return flight to Guam. Kinzou Kasuya, a 19-year-old Japanese pilot flying one of the Japanese fighters in pursuit of the Americans, rammed his aircraft into the fuselage of the B-29, destroying both planes. No one knows for certain how many Americans were in the B-29 as its crew had been hastily assembled on Guam. Villagers in Japan who witnessed the collision in the air saw about a dozen parachutes blossom. One of the Americans died when the cords of his parachute were severed by another Japanese plane. A second was alive when he reached the ground. He shot all but his last bullet at the villagers coming toward him, then used the last on himself. The other nine B-29 airmen who were captured by the Japanese after landing were subjected to vivisection at the Kyushu Imperial University. Professor Ishiyama Fukujirō and other doctors conducted four such sessions throughout May and early-June. The Western Military Command assisted in arranging these operations. Many of the Japanese personnel responsible for the deaths of Allied airmen were prosecuted in the Yokohama War Crimes Trials following World War II. Several of those found guilty were executed and the remainder were imprisoned.

== Cold War ==
=== 1953 Avro Lincoln shootdown incident ===
German civilians on the ground reported that two British airmen bailed out from the doomed aircraft, only to be strafed and killed by one of the Soviet MiG 15s in the 1953 Avro Lincoln shootdown incident.

=== Vietnam War ===
From his time in the Vietnam War, William Reeder reports South Vietnamese and American pilots being shot at in their parachutes. Reeder stated such events occurred during the peak of Operation Rolling Thunder.

During pitched aerial battles between fighter pilots of the Vietnam People's Air Force (VPAF) and those of the USAF and USN on 10 May 1972, the second day of the almost-six month long Operation Linebacker air interdiction campaign against North Vietnam, four MiG-17s from the 923rd Fighter Regiment were flying in defense of bridges at Hải Dương which were being attacked by a strike-force of A-6 Intruders, A-7 Corsairs IIs and F-4 Phantom IIs. MiG-17 pilot Do Hang was shot down by AIM-9 Sidewinder missiles fired from Lt. Duke Cunningham's (and his RIO Lt.jg Willy Driscoll) F-4 in the ensuing air battle, and while successfully ejecting from his stricken MiG-17, Do Hang was then killed by 20mm gunfire from American fighter aircraft making strafing passes at him while descending underneath his parachute; two more MiG-17s were shot-down by the F-4s of Lt. Cunningham and Lt. Connelly (pilots Nguyen Van Tho and Tra Van Kiem both KIA), while the MiG-17 piloted by Ta Ding Trung, who pursued the A-7s, out to sea, but was unable to score any hits, was able to return to base and survive the battle. MiG-21s from the 927th Fighter Regiment arrived moments later, directed by ground control intercept command (GCI) towards the F-4s now at about 10km north of Hải Dương; R-3S "Atoll" missiles fired from Vu Duc Hop's and Le Thanh Dao's MiG-21s found their mark against the F-4s of Cunningham/Driscoll and Blackburn/Rudloff respectively, and while Cunningham/Driscoll were able eject out at sea and be rescued (with pilot Cunningham famously fabricating the "Colonel Toon" tale in aftermath), Blackburn/Rudloff were seen to have both ejected and their parachutes going down over land, but only Lt. Rudloff was ever manifested on the POW list by North Vietnamese records. The remains of Cmdr. Harry L. Blackburn were returned to the Americans on 10 April 1986.

VPAF MiG-21 ace fighter pilot Le Thanh Dao would fly his final mission against U.S. aircraft on 15 October, 1972 when he was shot down by USAF F-4E Phantoms, and while safely ejecting from his stricken MiG, at least one Phantom fired cannon shells at him underneath his parachute, puncturing holes into his parachute, causing a high-rate of descent which upon landing, broken both his legs and his vertebra; Le Thanh Dao would spend over a year recovering from the injuries before returning to flight duty.

=== Soviet–Afghan War ===
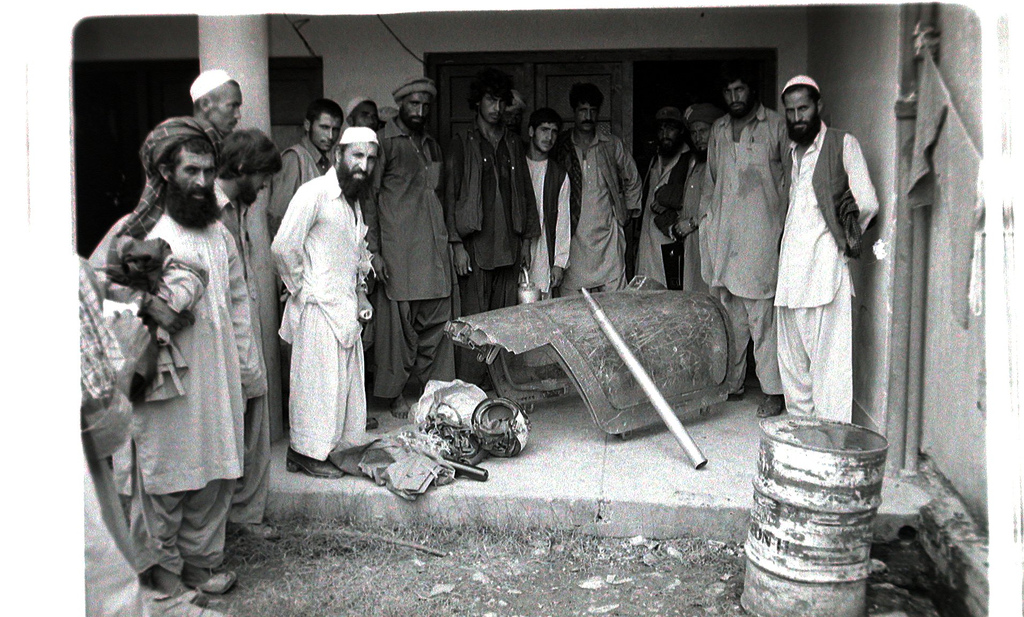
Afghans in Peshawar showing off canopy of downed Soviet jet, 1984.

Unconfirmed reports from Soviet sources Soviet–Afghan War suggest at least 5 Soviet pilots had been shot and killed either in their parachutes or on the ground after landing. 2 of which are presumed to be MiG-21 pilots in scattered reports estimated between April 1984 and July 1984. Possible evidence points to two MiG-21s that went missing in May 1984, in which the pilots had bailed out, but had gone missing. In 1985, 3 other pilots were shot down confirmed dead after Mujahideen fighters had reportedly taken responsibility, claiming that they had shot the pilots after they had ejected, with pieces of the ejection seat as proof. The group was possibly carrying out strike missions near Kabul, as it fits the description, as well as locals reporting several strike fighters in the area just before being shot down.

== Syrian civil war ==
In September 2015, Russia conducted military operations within Syria in furtherance of securing areas, bombing areas held by rebel groups, including the Syrian Turkmen Brigades, which operate close to the Syria–Turkey border. On 24 November 2015, a Russian Su-24 attack jet was shot down by a Turkish F-16C, and the two pilots ejected within Syrian territory controlled by Turkmen rebels. A commander of the Syrian Turkmen Brigades told Reuters that his forces opened fire on a pilot parachuting from the downed aircraft while attempting to land in non-rebel territory, and the group uploaded an image of rebel soldiers holding flaps of a NPP Zvezda K-36 ejection seat. Russian RIA later reported after retrieval that one of the pilots was killed by gunfire.
