= 1953 Avro Lincoln shootdown incident =

Cold War incident over East Germany

- Part of the Cold War
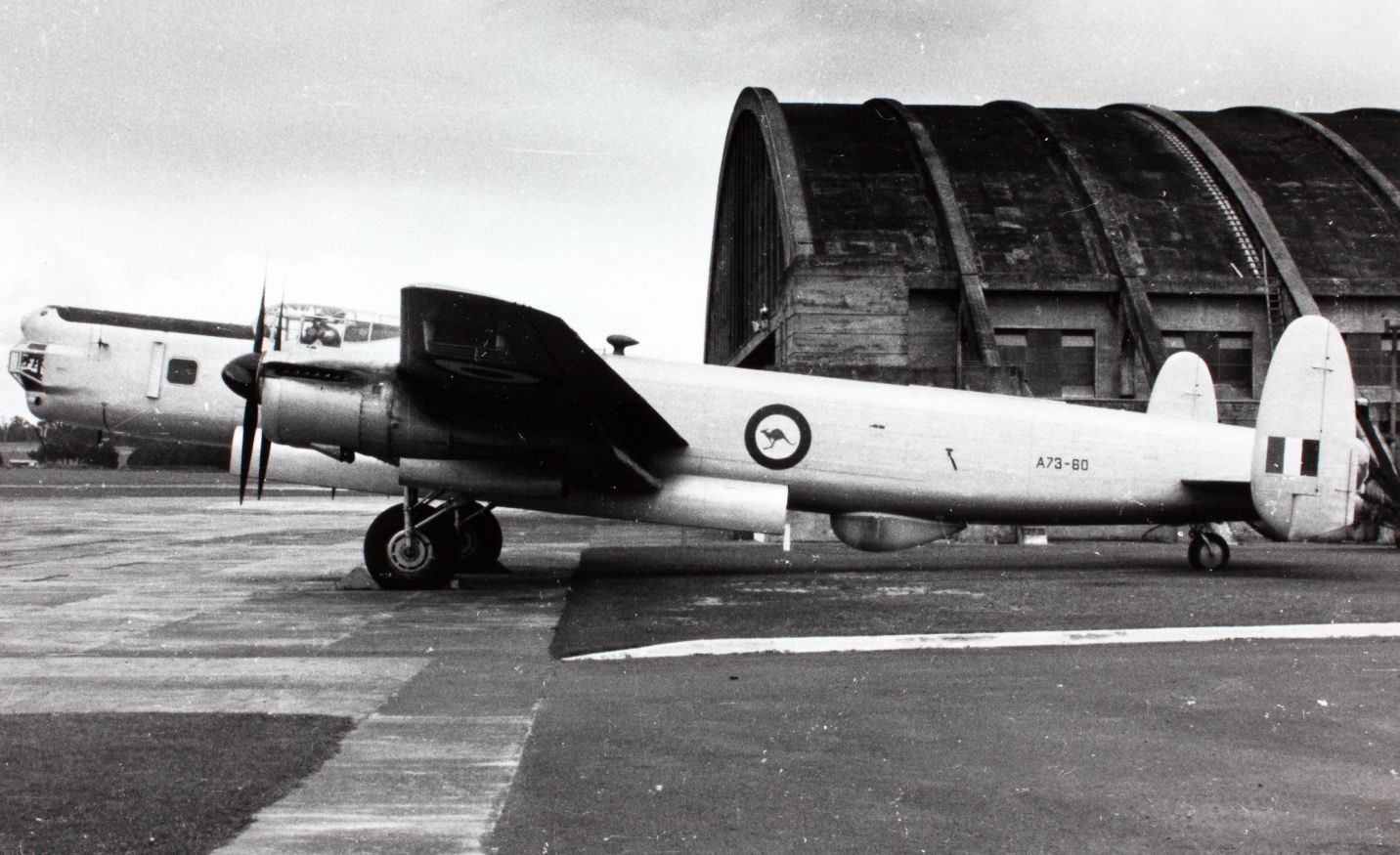
- Avro Lincoln aircraft similar to the one shot down over East Germany
- Type: Aircraft shootdown, attacks on parachutists
- Location: west of Boizenburg, East Germany; 53°22′40″N 10°39′40″E
- Objective: Intercept RAF Avro Lincoln aircraft
- Date: 12 March 1953
- Executed by: Soviet Air Forces
- Casualties: 7 killed

On 12 March 1953, an Avro Lincoln, which had intruded into East German airspace while flying on the Hamburg-Berlin air corridor over East Germany during a training mission, was shot down by a Soviet Mikoyan-Gurevich MiG-15 fighter aircraft. The incident drew intense criticism because the surviving crew members were fired at and killed by the Soviet aircraft, in direct violation of the Geneva Conventions.

== Shoot-down ==
The Avro Lincoln was operated by the Central Gunnery School at RAF Leconfield and was on a routine long-distance training flight. The aircraft was intercepted by two Soviet MiG 15 fighters and after it failed to respond to challenges it was shot down by the fighters' 23 mm cannon. The Avro Lincoln crashed east of Boizenburg, on the border of the British and Soviet zones, impacting in a wood between Vierkrug and Horst in the Soviet Zone. It was initially reported that six of the seven crew had been killed and one wounded; the wounded airman was one of three who had bailed out, but later died in hospital. German civilians on the ground reported that two British airmen bailed out from the doomed aircraft, only to be strafed and killed by one of the MiG 15s.

== Aftermath ==
The British government represented by the United Kingdom High Commissioner in Germany protested to the Soviet High Commissioner in Germany against the attack on a British aircraft and death of British servicemen. The Soviet news agency stated that the Lincoln had been flying over the German Democratic Republic and had failed to respond to lawful commands to land at the nearest airfield and had shot at the fighters. The British Foreign Secretary Anthony Eden described it as a "barbaric" act. The British Prime Minister Winston Churchill condemned the attack in a statement to parliament and emphasised the Avro Lincoln was not armed and within the agreed air corridor. British historian Richard Aldrich claims that while the bomber was not directly involved in airborne intelligence-gathering, "its progress was being carefully tracked by a British 'sigint' unit on the ground at RAF Scharfoldendorf in the British Zone of Germany".
