= American Ruse =

American band

- Also known as: The Ruse
- Origin: Oklahoma City, Oklahoma, Southern United States
- Genres: Rock and Roll; Southern Rock; Punk Rock
- Spinoffs: Los Hijos Del Diablo
- Past members: Grant Tatum; Ryan Schofield; Travis Harvey; Regan Killackey; Rob Robinson; Don Nguyen; Ricky Brooks; Patrick Fleming
- Website: http://www.americanruse.com

American Ruse was a 5-piece Rock 'n' roll band from Oklahoma City, Oklahoma. They formed in 2003 and have opened for Fu Manchu, The Riverboat Gamblers, The Black Halos and Nebula. Their tracks have been featured in 411 Video Magazine #66 and appear on Flattery: a tribute to Radio Birdman. American Ruse disbanded in 2005. Some members went on to form Los Hijos Del Diablo

== Discography ==
American Ruse - Self Titled

- recorded in 2004 by Stephen Egeraton

Flattery: A tribute to Radio Birdman Volume 3

- Do the Pop
