= Đặng Ngọc Ngự =

Đặng Ngọc Ngự (1 November 1939 – 8 July or 15 August 1972) † was a Mikoyan-Gurevich MiG-21 pilot of the Vietnamese People's Air Force who flew with the 921st fighter regiment and tied for third place amongst Vietnam War fighter aces with seven kills.

He was in the air fighting U.S. fighter jets in a MiG-21MF (No. 5136) on the day of 10 May 1972, claiming victory over an F-4 Phantom II; the same day USN F-4 Phantom II pilot Duke Cunningham and his RIO Bill Driscoll were shot down after they had allegedly shot-down the legendary, or mythical, Colonel Toon, of which it's said that Đặng and other pilots, including sub-ace MiG-21 pilot Dinh Ton, had all played-part in the legendary (or mythical) role of Colonel Toon.

The following victories include the kills known to be acknowledged and credited to him by the VPAF:

- 13 August 1966, Firebee/Lightning Bug drone;
- 14 December 1966, a USAF F-105D (US-side does not confirm);
- 22 May 1967, a USAF F-4C (pilot Perrine, WSO Backus, KIA, US claims loss to AAA);
- 8 November 1967, a USAF F-4D (pilot Gordon, WSO Brenneman, POWs, 555th TFS);
- 24 April 1968, Firebee/Lightning Bug drone;
- 4 March 1969, Firebee/Lightning Bug drone;
- 10 May 1972, an F-4 (US-side does not confirm);
- 8 July 1972, a USAF F-4E (pilot Ross, WSO Imaye, rescued). † According to one source, Đặng Ngọc Ngự was shot down and killed on 15 August 1972 by an F-4E after a brief engagement NW of Hanoi, and credited to Captains Fred Sheffler and Mark Massen (336th TFS, 4th TFW, TDY to Ubon AB, Thailand) whom "thwarted his attack with a launch of an AIM-7 that ended his career". Another source points to his demise earlier on 8 July 1972, when an F-4E No. 67-0270 of Hardy/Lewinsky shot down Ngự following the attack on, and ultimately the downing of the F-4E No. 69-7563 of Ross/Imaye (also with the 336th TFS, 4thTFW) whom were able to fly their stricken Phantom back across friendly lines in Thailand on one engine before safely ejecting close to their base just north of Udorn.

Đặng Ngọc Ngự was posthumously awarded the Hero of the Vietnamese People's Armed Forces on 11 January 1973.

== See also ==
- List of Vietnam War flying aces
