= Nguyen Van Nghi =

Vietnamese-French physician

Nguyễn Văn Nghị (11 January 1909 in Hanoi – 17 December 1999 in Marseille) was a Vietnamese-French physician who was prominent among those credited with bringing Chinese medicine to the West

== Biography ==
Born in Hanoi, French Indochina (present-day Vietnam), Nghi was educated in Vietnam, China, and France. Completing his medical degree from the Montpellier University, he began a combined Eastern and Western medical practice in 1940.

In 1954 he devoted his practice entirely to acupuncture based on the classical texts: Huangdi Neijing (Suwen, Lingshu) and the Nan Jing. He was a doctor, author, teacher and scholar of the classic texts of Chinese Medicine (acupuncture-moxibustion). Much of his life's work revolved around translating and adding his own commentary to an unmolested Tang dynasty copy of the Huangdi Neijing (Yellow Emperor's Internal Classic) from an ancient script into the French language.

He was insistent that Western medicine and Chinese Medicine were not separate scientific pursuits, but that there was One Medicine.

It would appear likely that some of this account is legend rather than history. The commentary referred to as that of 'Ma Yuan Tai (Ma Shi)' would most likely be Ma Xuan Tai (c.1580). The commentary attributed to Zhang Yan Yin (Zhang Shi)' would most likely be Zhang An Yin (Zhang Zhi Cong) (1619–1674). These dates would be consistent with the transmission of Chinese medicine to Vietnam in the 1700s.

Nghi began to collaborate with Albert Chamfrault and M. Ung Kan Sam. The beginning of this school can be attributed to George Soulié de Morant, who is the founder of the French school of acupuncture. By 1966, Chamfrault had become President of the French Acupuncture Association, and had succeeded in gathering all the physician acupuncturists - followers of De la Fuÿe, Niboyet and others under the same umbrella (The National Confederation of Medical Acupuncturists, founded in 1969. Chamfrault died in 1969 and Dr. Van Nghi inherited his mantle.

Nghi's brother was director of the Institute of Traditional Medicine in Hanoi, and through him, Van Nghi had access to the North Vietnamese teaching text Trung Y Hoc (Studies of Chinese Medicine) and teaching materials from Beijing and Nanjing which explain the strong TCM flavor of much of his (especially later) writing. His contributions were incorporated into the syllabus of the British College of Acupuncture by Keith Lamont, Royston Low and colleagues.

== Death ==
He died on 17 December 1999, aged 90, in Marseille, France.

== Works ==
- Pathogénie et pathologie energétique en médecine Chinoise: Traitement par acupuncture et massages. Marseille. 1977, p. 27 (in French)
- Pathogenese und Pathologie der Energetik in der Chinesischen Medizin. Band 1 & Band 2. Uelzen, MLV, 1974 (in German)
- Pathogenese und Pathologie der Energetik in der Chinesischen Medizin (Behandlung durch Akupunktur und Massage). Band 1 & Band 2. Uelzen, MLV, zweite auflage, 1977 (in German)
- Патогенез и патология энергетики в китайской медицине. // Pathogenese und Pathologie der Energetik in der Chinesischen Medizin. Band 1 & Band 2. Contents (in Russian)
- Патогенез и патология энергетики в китайской медицине. Глава 3. Пять движений и Шесть энергий. // Pathogenese und pathologie der energetic in der chinesischen medizin (behandlung durch Akupunktur und Massage) — Band 1, 1977; Kapitel 3, SS. pp. 45–63. Перевёл с немецкого Михаил Смирнов (1984), редактор и автор примечаний А. Н. Ахметсафин (in Russian)
- Патогенез заболеваний. Диагностика и лечение методами традиционной китайской медицины: иглоукалывание, массаж, прижигание. Тома 1, 2. [Перевод с китайского]. Редактор и переводчик Салдаев П. В. — МП «Вен-Мер», фирма «Эврика», Новосибирск, 1992. — 584 с. — ISBN 5-87608-001-2 (in Russian)
- Albert Chamfrault, Nguyen Van Nghi. L' Energétique Humaine en Médecine Chinoise. (Traité de médecine chinoise: d'après les textes chinois anciens et modernes. Tome VI). Angoulême, Editions Chamfrault, Imprimerie de la Charente, 1969, 1981 [Réédition], p. 463 (in French)
- Albert Chamfrault, Nguyen Van Nghi. Atlas Anatomique. Imprimerie de la Charente, Angoulême, 1969, p. 73 (in French)
- Nguyen Van Nghi, Tran Viet Dzung, Christine Recours Nguyen. Art et Pratique de l'Acupuncture et de la Moxibustion. Selon Zhen Jiu Da Cheng de Yang Chi Chou.
  - Tome I. — Edition N.V.N. (Nguyen Van Nghi), Marseille, 1982. — 307 pages.
  - Tome II. — Editions N.V.N. (Nguyen Van Nghi), Marseille, 1984. — 400 pages.
  - Tome III. — Editions N.V.N. (Nguyen Van Nghi), Marseille, 1989. — 489 pages.

Indefinite publishings

- Théorie et pratique de l'analgésie par acupuncture (out of print) co-authors Dr Mai Van Dong, Dr Uld. Lanza
- Médecine traditionnelle chinoise, pathogenie et pathologie co-author Dr. Christine Recours Nguyen
- Semiologie et thérapeutique en médecine énergétique orientale Semeotica e terapia nelle medecina energetica orientale (italiano)
- Pharmacologie en médecine orientale co-author Dr Mai Van Dong

Translations and Exegesis of Ancient Texts

- «The Suwen» Huangdi Neijing Suwen : Tome 1 Tome 2 Tome 3 co-author Dr Nguyen Patrick Tome 4 co-author Dr Ch. Recours Nguyen
- «Le Dacheng» : co-authors Dr Tran Viet Dzung, Dr Ch. Recours Nguyen Art et pratique de l’Acupuncture et de la moxibustion (selon Zhen Jiu Da Cheng) Tome 1 Tome 2 Tome 3
- «The Shangan Lun» : co-author Dr Ch. Recours Nguyen Maladies évolutives des 3 Yin et des 3 Yang (selon Shanghan Lun de Zhang Zhongjing)
- «The Maijing» : co-authors Dr Bui Van Tho, Dr Ch. Recours Nguyen Mai Jing, classique des pouls de Wang Shu He (210-285 ap. J-C)
- «The Lingshu» : co-authors Dr Tran Viet Dzung, Dr Ch. Recours Nguyen
- «Huangdi Neijing Lingshu» Tome 1 Tome 2 Tome 3
- «The Nanjing» : co-authors Dr Tran Viet Dzung, Dr Ch. Recours Nguyen
