= Nguyễn Sĩ Bình =

Vietnamese-American democracy activist

Nguyễn Sĩ Bình is a South Vietnam-born Vietnamese American democracy activist. He serves as the chairman of the People's Action Party of Vietnam.

Nguyen Si Binh attended the University of Maryland, College Park, and graduated with a degree in nuclear engineering in 1981.

He worked for Bechtel Corporation, then in 1988 settled in Atlanta, Georgia, and joined a real estate developing firm as a Regional Manager.

On April 25, 1991, he and 16 members of this party were arrested in Vietnam, while trying to form a secondary political party. The government of Vietnam charged him with trying to overthrow the government.
