= Nguyễn Văn Cốc =

Vietnamese fighter ace

- Born: December 1942 (age 83); Việt Yên, Bắc Giang, French Indochina
- Military career
- Allegiance: North Vietnam (1961–1975); Vietnam (1976–2002)
- Branch: Vietnam People's Air Force
- Service years: 1961–2002
- Rank: Lieutenant-general
- Conflicts: Vietnam War

Nguyễn Văn Cốc (born December 1942) is a Vietnamese former fighter pilot and MiG-21 flying ace during the Vietnam War. He served in the North Vietnamese Air Force during the war, and rose to prominence after he was credited for shooting down nine United States Air Force (USAF) aircraft.

== Early life ==
Nguyễn Văn Cốc was born in December 1942 at Việt Yên of the province of Bắc Giang in French Indochina, north of Hanoi. When he was five-years-old, his father, Nguyen Van Bay (Chairman of the Viet Minh in the district) and his uncle (also a member of the Viet Minh), were killed by the French. Fearing further trouble with the French, his mother moved the family. Nguyễn spent the rest of his childhood near Chu air base, which kindled an interest in aircraft.

Nguyễn Văn Cốc attended Ngô Sĩ Liên school in Bắc Giang and upon completion of his schooling, enlisted in the Quan Chung Khong Quan (Vietnamese People's Air Force, VPAF) in 1961 and underwent his initial training at Cat Bi Airbase in Haiphong. Nguyễn subsequently spent four years undergoing pilot training in the Soviet Union at the Bataysk and Krasnodar Soviet Air Force bases. Of the 120 trainees dispatched in Nguyễn's draft to the Soviet Union, he was one of seven who graduated as a MiG-17 pilot.

After a brief spell back in North Vietnam serving with the 921st Sao Do (Red Star) Fighter Regiment, he returned to the Soviet Union and underwent conversion training to the MiG-21 in a two-seat Mig-21U, before returning to the 921st Fighter Regiment in June 1965. He began operational flying in December 1965.

On 2 January 1967, he was among a group of pilots who fell into a trap set by the United States Air Force's 8th Tactical Fighter Wing. Nguyễn Văn Cốc and four other Vietnamese pilots were shot down. All ejected safely.

Flying a MIG-21PF, Nguyễn Văn Cốc normally served as a wingman. He scored all his victories using the heat-seeking Vympel K-13 missile.

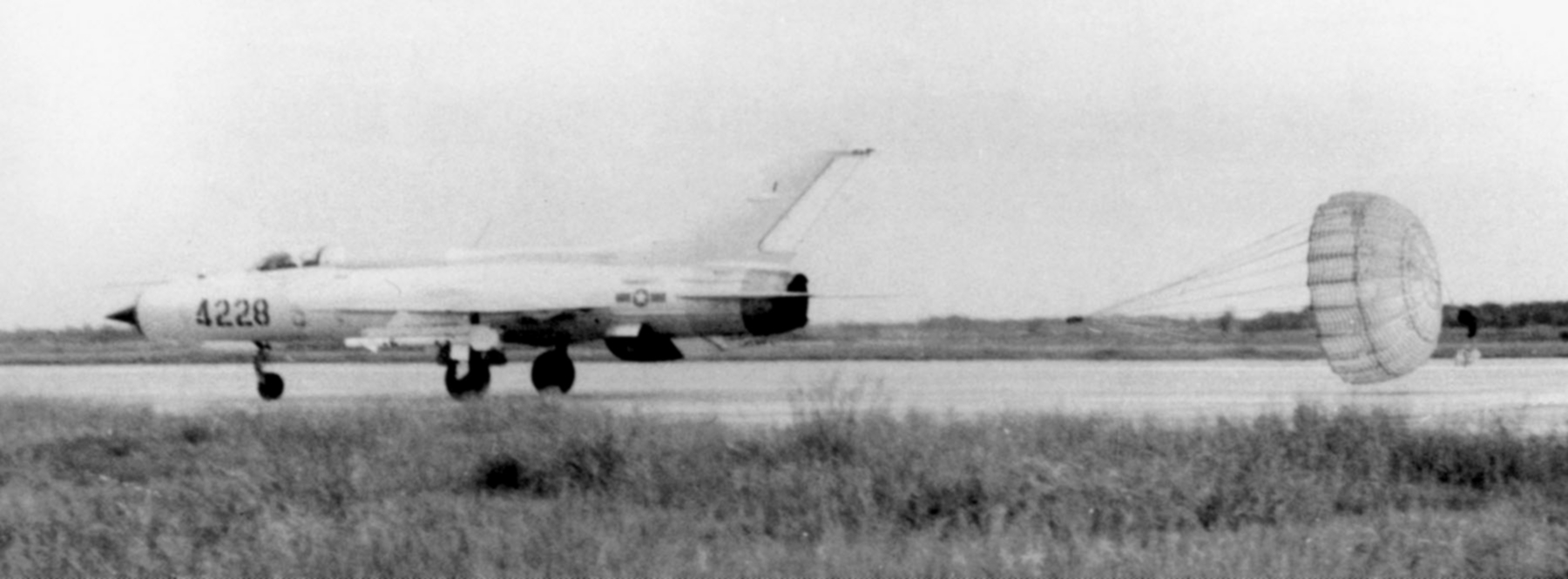
An all-missile-armed VPAF MiG-21PFL (Fishbed D) just like the one Văn Cốc flew in the war from 1967-69; seen here landing

On June 18, 1969, Nguyễn Văn Cốc was awarded a Huy Hiệu medal for each of his nine kills. The end of Operation Rolling Thunder on 31 October 1968 removed him from the opportunity for further air combat. In early 1970, Nguyễn Văn Cốc was transferred from operational duties to a training academy so that his valuable combat experience could be put to use in training new pilots. Among the pilots he trained was Nguyen Duc Soat.

After the war, Nguyễn Văn Cốc remained with the Vietnamese People's Air Force, retiring with the rank of Chief Inspector in 2002 after declining health.

== Air combat victories ==
Nine air-to-air combat kills of United States aircraft and two AQM-34 Firebee/Lightning Bug UAV kills were credited to him during the Vietnam War. Of these, seven aircraft and two UAV have currently been acknowledged by the United States Air Force. Coc also claimed an F-4 Phantom and F-105 Thunderchief in November and 17 December 1967 but there are no corresponding American losses stated.

The following kills, while flying the MiG-21, have been credited to Van Coc by the VPAF (aka NVAF):

- 30 April 1967: USAF F-105D piloted by Robert A. Abbott of the USAF 355th TFW (POW). This was his first air victory and occurred while he was acting as a wingman to flight leader Nguyen Ngoc Do, who downed an F-105F.
- 23 August 1967: USAF F-4D piloted by Carrigan (POW) with RIO Lane (KIA), 555th TFS.
- 7 October 1967: USAF F-105D piloted by Fullam (KIA), 67th TFS.
- 18 November 1967: USAF F-105D piloted by Reed (rescued), 388th TFW.
- 20 November 1967: USAF F-105; US-side does not confirm.
- 12 December 1967: USAF F-105; damaged.
- 7 May 1968: On the afternoon of 7 May 1968, three flights of MiG-21 fighters from the VPAF 921st Regiment were flying towards Tho Xuan Air Base, as part of redeployment in response to the U.S. bombing halt above the 19th Parallel. The flights were led by Dang Ngoc Ngu, Nguyen Van Minh and Nguyen Van Coc. Due to the lack of coordination between the different sections of the VPAF 921st Fighter Regiment and the ground-based air-defense forces, the MiG-21 flights were mistakenly identified as U.S. fighter-bombers and were fired upon by North Vietnamese anti-aircraft artillery. Moments later, Ngu also mistook an escorting flight of MiG-21 fighters flown by Nguyen Dang Kinh and Nguyen Van Lung for U.S. fighters. He dropped his fuel tanks to prepare for an attack which was promptly aborted when he realized they were North Vietnamese.

Later, Ngu and Coc arrived over the skies of Do Luong, north-east of Vinh, and they made three circuits over the area when they were told that enemy aircraft were detected coming from the sea; these were real U.S. fighters. The U.S. flight detected were a formation of five F-4B Phantom II from Fighter Squadron 92 (VF-92), USS Enterprise, led by Lieutenant Commander Ejnar S. Christensen with his RIO Worth A. Kramer. Over North Vietnamese airspace, a U.S. Navy EKA-3A electronic warfare aircraft tried to jam North Vietnamese communications but failed, and Nhu’s flight of MiG-21 fighters was guided towards their target by ground controllers.

While trying to engage the VPAF MiGs, the F-4B formation became separated due to confusion in radar control. In the ensuing dogfight, two AIM-7 missiles were fired by the U.S. Navy fighters but missed. Ngu then noticed two F-4B Phantoms about 5 kilometers (3.1 mi) to starboard, but could not get into a suitable firing position. Coc was right behind Ngu at the time, but he wanted to disengage from the fight as his aircraft was running low on fuel. However, Coc quickly changed his mind after he spotted an F-4B ahead of him at an altitude of 2,500 meters (8,200 ft). Coc immediately gave chase to the F-4B, which were flying out to sea, and successfully scored a hit after he fired two R-3S Atoll missiles from an altitude of 1,500 meters (4,900 ft). The F-4B Phantom II burst into flames and crashed into the sea at 6:44 pm.

The action gave the VPAF their first aerial victory over the airspace above the Military Zone IV of North Vietnam and gave Nguyen Van Coc his seventh aerial victory. The U.S. Navy confirmed that the downed F-4B had been BuNo 151485, callsign Silver Kite 210, of VF-92 launched from Enterprise. The pilot of BuNo 151485, Lieutenant Commander E.S. Christenson, and his Radar Intercept Officer, Lieutenant (jg) W.A. Kramer ejected safely from their aircraft before impact and were recovered a short time later.

- 4 June 1968: USAF AQM-34 Firebee/Lightning Bug unmanned drone.
- 8 November 1968: USAF AQM-34 Firebee/Lightning Bug unmanned drone.
- 3 August 1969: USAF AQM-34 Firebee/Lightning Bug unmanned drone.
- 20 December 1969: A USAF AQM-34 Firebee/Lightning Bug. This could have been an OV-10 Bronco whose two crew died when it was shot down in the same area.

== See also ==
- List of Vietnam War flying aces
- Phạm Tuân
- Weapons of the Vietnam War
