= Nguyen Khac Chinh =

Vietnamese attorney and writer

Nguyễn Khác Chính (16 February 1924 – 24 September 2016) was a Vietnamese attorney, writer and anti-communist resistant, who became a political prisoner in Vietnam after the Fall of Saigon. Following his release in 1992, he lived in exile in the United States.

== Early life ==
Nguyễn was born in Quảng Nam Province, Vietnam on 16 February 1924. He graduated Sorbonne Law School in Paris, France.

As a writer, he penned works in both Vietnamese and French, which included 20 novels, 2 plays and several poems. In 1966, he was declared the winner of the World Literary Prize for his French language short stories.

During the era of the Republic of Vietnam, he served as an attorney for the Superior Appellate Court in Saigon.

== Political activity and imprisonment ==
Nguyễn was a member of the Vietnamese Nationalist Party. A devout anti-communist, he chose to remain during the Fall of Saigon on 30 April 1975, and he formed the People's Forces For the Recovery of Vietnam. In 1975, he was the Judicial Advisor to the Saint Vincent Church Uprising, Saigon. This led to his arrest by the Vietnamese Communists on 27 December, and he received a life sentence. During his imprisonment, he was allegedly tortured and spent several years in solitary confinement. When asked how he survived for so long in prison, Nguyen stated "I composed music and wrote poems and stored them in here [pointing at his head]".

Under political pressure from the United States Department of State, the French Government and PEN International, Nguyễn was released by the Vietnamese Government after seventeen years in jail. He was granted political asylum, and reunited with his family at Dulles International Airport on 3 March 1992, before living with them in Maryland.

== Life in exile ==
In 1996, he joined the exiled anti-communist organization, the Government of Free Vietnam, and served as its Minister of Information.

On 15 August 1997, Nguyễn founded the Free Vietnam Coalition Party, and in June 2002, he was chosen as Chairman of the Vietnamese Nationals Council.

Nguyễn latterly lived in Silver Spring, Maryland. He was later diagnosed with multiple myeloma, which had become terminal by 2015. He died on 24 September 2016, at the age of 92.
