= Nguyen Huy Dau =

Vietnamese diplomat

Nguyễn Huy Đẩu was born on May 8, 1914, in Vietnam.

== Biography ==
In 1952, he graduated from Hanoi University School of Law degree and awarded a Doctorate Degree.

He has served as Ambassador to the Kingdom of Morocco and Counsel General in New Delhi, India.

In 1967, he served as Head Judge Superior Court in Saigon, until 1969, and then assigned as Inspector General, of Ministry of Foreign Affairs.

He was a visiting professor at Saigon University School of Law and Phu Tho Tech College.

In April 1975, he escaped during the Fall of Saigon because he was anti-communist and immigrated to the United States.

Since 1995, he has served as the Minister of Justice of an exiled anti-communist organization known as The Government of Free Vietnam.

He died September 22, 2008.
