= Edgar Foshee =

American activist

- Military career
- Allegiance: United States
- Branch: United States Army
- Rank: Serjeant Major
- Conflicts: Vietnam War

Sergeant Major Edgar Foshee, a devout anti-communist, served as a combat medic in the U.S. Army Special Forces. His former wife Thuong Nguyen Cuc Foshee was held without formal charge by the government of Vietnam starting in September 2005. She was eventually convicted of terrorism and returned to the United States in November 2006 after her early release for medical problems.

== Biography ==
In 1974, he retired from the United States Army, and later retired as an agent from the Central Intelligence Agency (CIA). He had served in Vietnam with both organizations, assisting the South Vietnamese government against the Communist North Vietnamese Army and their Viet Cong agents.

He owned a construction company until 1980, and retired with his wife to Florida.

On April 30, 1995, he was appointed Chairman of the International Committee of an exiled anti-communist organization known as The Government of Free Vietnam.

== Quotes ==
- "I do hope that the Vietnamese Community Abroad quickly identifies the malicious motive of the Viet Cong."
- "Vietnam is sending out secret agents to disrupt the motivation of the Vietnamese Community Abroad."
- "Mr Nguyen Huu Chanh and the Government of Free Vietnam are motivated individuals determined to fight against the VCs to the end."
