= Nguyễn Hợp Đoàn =

Vietnamese general, last pre-communist mayor of Dalat (1928–2002)

Nguyen Hop Doan
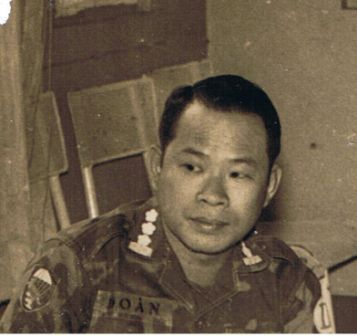
- Nguyen Hop Doan wearing the rank of Colonel
- Born: 28 August 1928; Hải Dương Province, French Indochina
- Died: 15 April 2002 (aged 73)
- Burial place: Houston, Texas
- Military career
- Allegiance: South Vietnam
- Branch: ARVN 22nd Infantry Division / 42nd Regiment; ARVN 9th Infantry Division; ARVN 81st Airborne Rangers – Biet Cach Du (BCD); Army of the Republic of Vietnam Special Forces – Luc Luong Dac Biet (LLDB / LDB)
- Service years: ~1950–1975
- Rank: Brigadier General
- Conflicts: Vietnam War: Battle of Dak To; Ben Het Battle; Battle of Dak Seang; Battle of Kontum; Tet Offensive
- Awards: National Order of Vietnam, 4th Class (Bao Quoc Huan Chuong); ARVN Joint Forces Order (Luc Quan Huan Chuong); Service Medal (Tham Muu Boi Tinh); Republic of Vietnam Campaign Medal (Chien Dich Boi Tinh); Gallantry Cross, 12 citations (Anh Dung Boi Tinh); Korea Medal of Honor; US Army Bronze Star with "V" Device; US Army Silver Star

Nguyễn Hợp Đoàn (28 August 1928 – 15 April 2002) was to be the last Mayor of Đà Lạt, the largest city of the Central Highlands region in South Vietnam and Governor of Tuyên Đức Province, before the fall of Saigon that led to the reunification of Vietnam under the Communist party in 1975.

== Family ==
Đoàn was born in Hải Dương Province in 1928 to Nguyễn Thúc Vinh, a former Governor of Bắc Kạn Province in North Vietnam. The family fled South at the partitioning of the country following the Geneva Accords of 1954.

== Military career ==
Đoàn attended the 4th class of the elite Vietnamese National Military Academy in Dalat, the U.S. Army Command and General Staff College (USACGSC) in 1964 and the U.S. Army War College (USAWC). He was the youngest Major in the South Vietnamese Army at age 24.

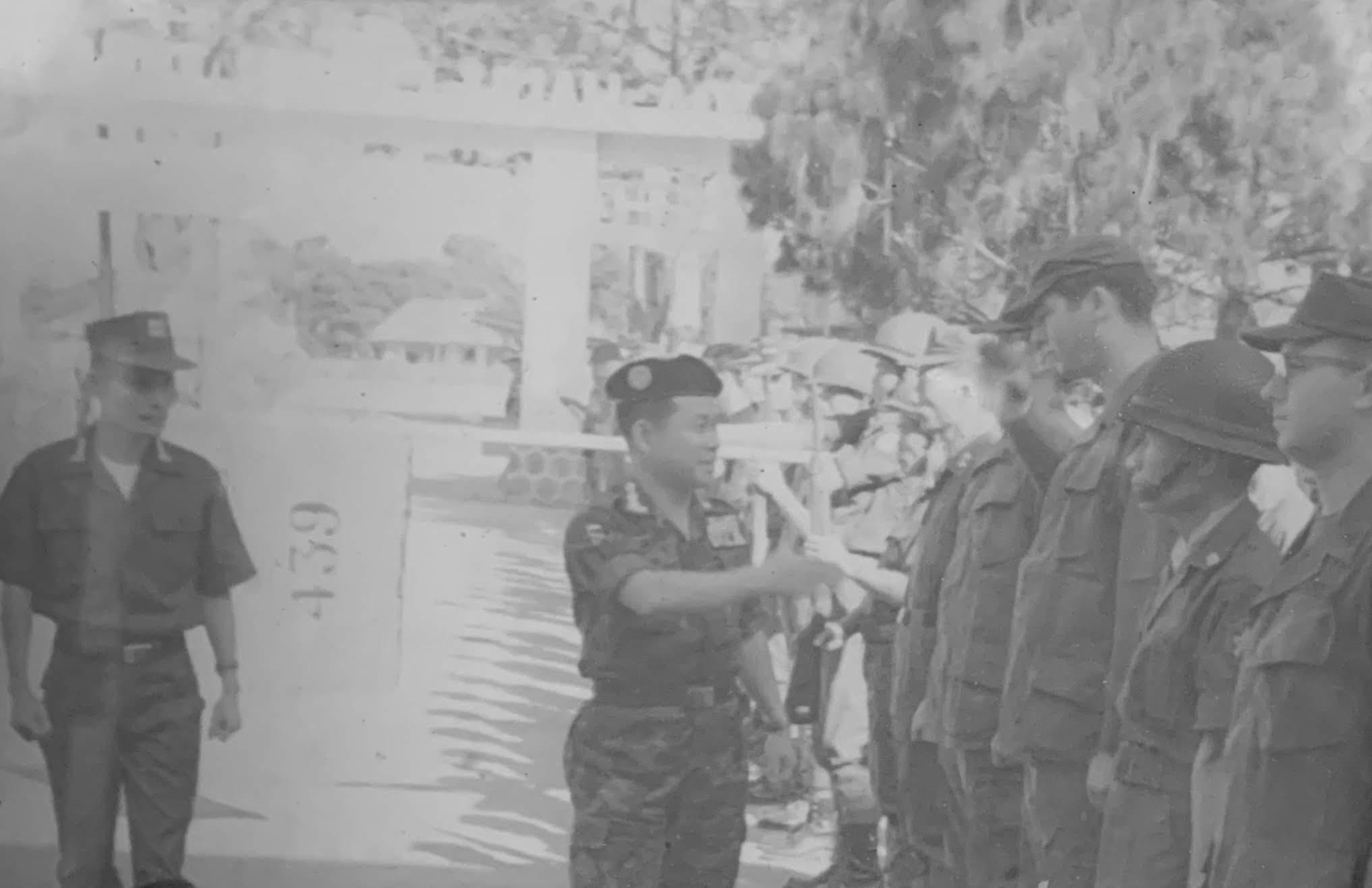
Tet Offensive - Kontum Military HQ 1968

Đoàn served as Commanding Officer of 705th Battalion, Commanding Officer of 42nd Regiment (Thai Binh), Commanding Officer of 14th Infantry Regiment of the 9th Infantry Division, Deputy Director National School of Psychological Warfare, Deputy Chief of Staff for 4th Corp Psychological Warfare and Chief of Staff of 9th Division. He also served as High Command’s Chief of Staff of Vietnam's Airborne Rangers (81st Airborne Commando Battalion) in 1961 and High Command’s Chief of Staff of Vietnam's Special Forces in 1965.

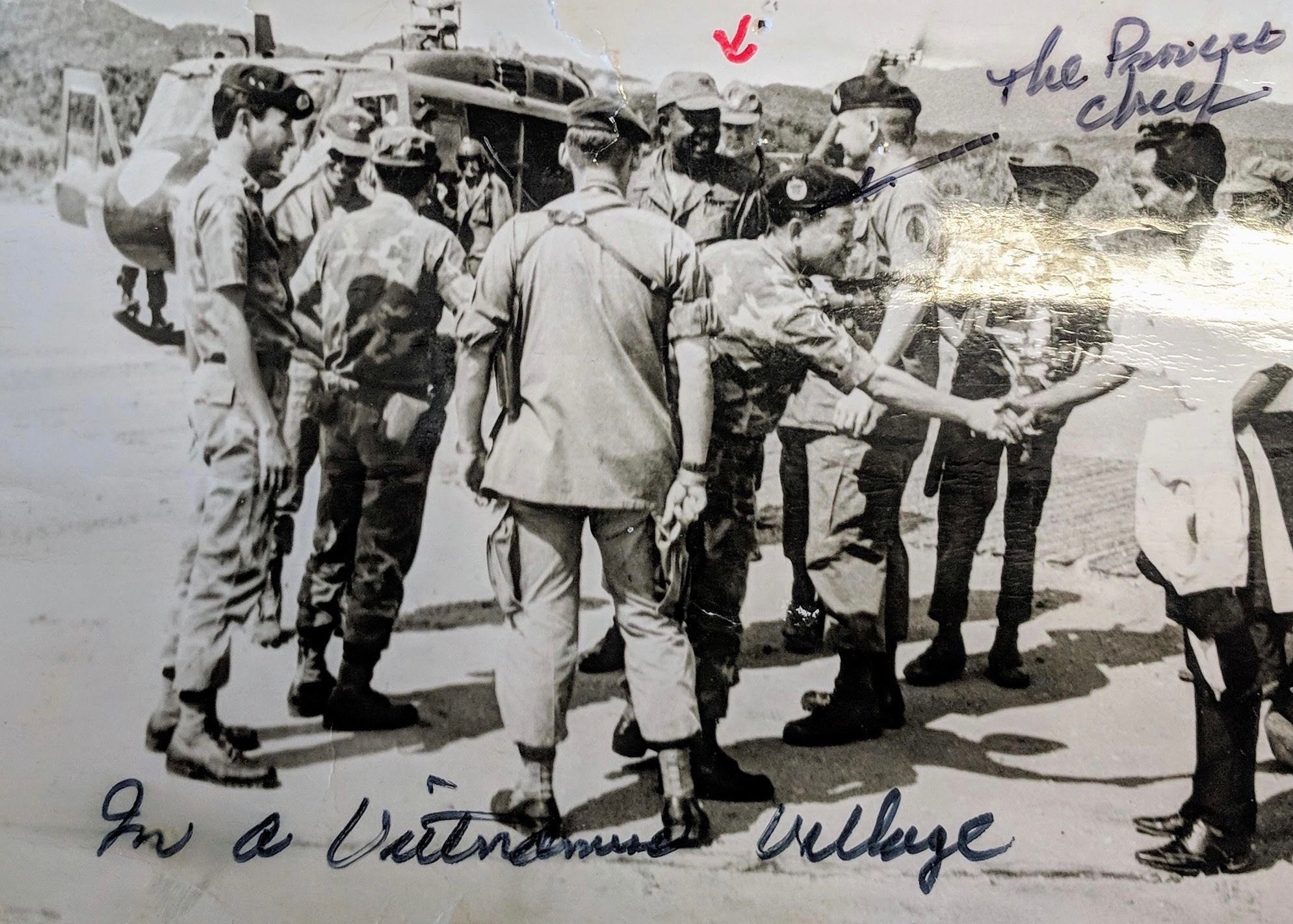
Battle of Dak To (1967)

Đoàn was Province Chief of Kon Tum Province from 1965–70, where the communist Tet Offensive of 1968 was soundly defeated. He excelled as a Military Officer and as a Public Servant, in his dual role as the Governor of the Military District of Tuyen Duc, and as Mayor of the provincial capital city of Dalat from 1970–75. During his tenure, Dalat was a safe haven. He built on its charm and beauty, and kept it a favorite honeymoon destination. Dalat was also a center of learning, with many boarding schools, universities, military academies and seminaries. South Vietnam's sole nuclear reactor and associated scientists and personnel were based in Da Lat. In 1975, in the hope that he would bring tranquility to the capital city, President Thiệu appointed Đoàn its next mayor. He was promoted to the rank of Brigadier General and made plans to assume the mayorship.

== Decorations and medals ==
Đoàn received numerous Medals, Honors and Citations including National Order of Vietnam, 4th Class (Bao Quoc Huan Chuong), ARVN (Army of the Republic of Vietnam) Joint Forces Order (Luc Quan Huan Chuong), Service Medal (Tham Muu Boi Tinh), Republic of Vietnam Campaign Medal (Chien Dich Boi Tinh), 12 Gallantry Cross Medals (Anh Dung Boi Tinh), Korea Medal of Honor and the United States Silver Star and Bronze Star with "V" Device Medals.

- South Vietnam :
  - Officer of the National Order of Vietnam
  - Army Distinguished Service Order, First Class
  - Gallantry Cross, 12 Citations
  - Staff Service Medal, First Class
  - Vietnam Campaign Medal
- USA :
  - Silver Star Medal
  - Bronze Star Medal with "V" Device
