= Navia Nguyen =

American actress and model

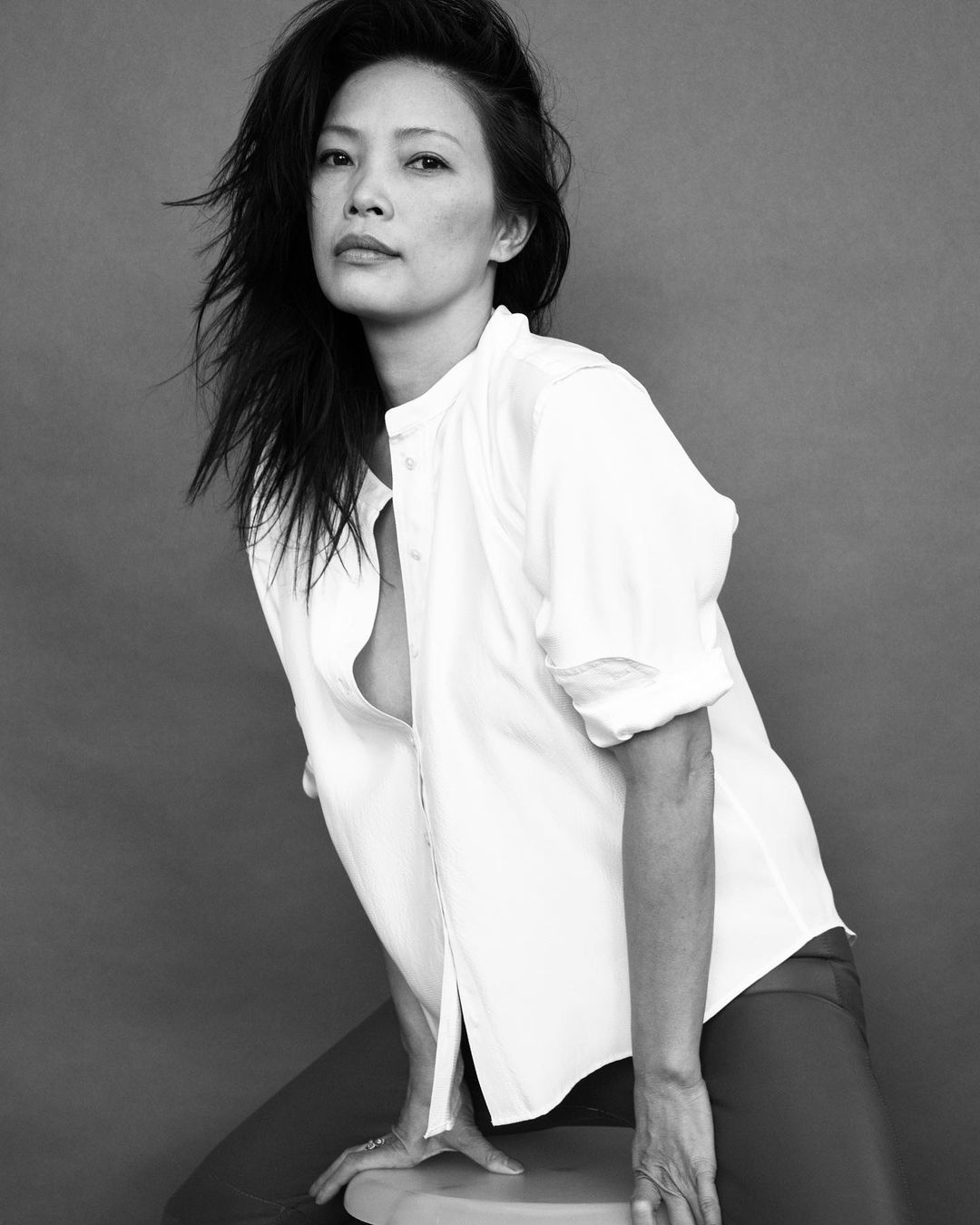
- Nguyen in a photo shoot published in Bali on 2020-2021
- Born: Phu Quoc
- Education: Harvard Business School (Owner/President Management Program 64)
- Occupations: Actress; Model; Entrepreneur
- Years active: 1986–present
- Website: navianguyen.com

Navia Nguyen is a Vietnamese American model and entrepreneur. She founded AMO World Bali encompassing AMO Baths, AMO Skin, AMO Spa and AMO Cafe. She was born on Phu Quoc, South Vietnam and raised in New York City.

== Rise to Prominence ==
At the age of 14, photographer Stephan Lupino discovered her, capturing an image that would be featured on the cover of Zoom (magazine). She was quickly signed to Elite Model Management. Nguyen appeared in the 1996 Pirelli Calendar and the Sports Illustrated Swimsuit Issue in 1997. Selected by People Magazine' as the "50 Most Beautiful People", she has modeled for fashion houses like Chanel, Karl Lagerfeld, John Galliano, Fendi, and Christian Dior, as well as American firms such as: GAP and Tommy Hilfiger. She is considered to be the first Asian supermodel.

== Personal life ==
Nguyen is a mother to her 16-year-old daughter. She splits her time between Dumbo, Brooklyn and Canggu, Bali.

== Entrepreneurial Ventures ==
By 2008, Nguyen had left acting and modeling to create AMO World in Bali.

=== Film ===
Year	Title	Role	Notes
2002	The Quiet American	House of 500 Girls' Woman	
2005	Hitch	Mika	
2005	Memoirs of a Geisha	Izuko	
2006	The Boys & Girls Guide to Getting Down	June	
2008	Remarkable Power	Reporter	

=== Television ===
Year	Title	Role	Notes
1998	Sex and the City	Tatiana	Episode: "Sex and the City"
2001	As If	Lilli	Episode: "Jamie's POV"
