= George Keenlyside =

English footballer

Personal information
- Full name: George Keenlyside
- Date of birth: 4 August 1889
- Place of birth: Jarrow, England
- Date of death: 1967 (aged 77–78)
- Position: Winger

Senior career*
Years	Team	Apps	(Gls)
1904–1905	Jarrow Royal Oak		
1905–1906	Jarrow Park Villa		
1906–1907	Jarrow Croft		
1907–1910	Sunderland	0	(0)
1910	Jarrow		
1910	Dinnington Main Colliery Welfare		
1911	Partick Thistle		
1911	Jarrow Croft		
1919–1923	South Shields	98	(11)
1923–1924	Hartlepools United	24	(1)
1924	Chester-le-Street		
1925	Jarrow		
Total		122	(12)
- * Club domestic league appearances and goals

George Keenlyside (4 August 1889–1967) was an English footballer who played in the Football League for Hartlepools United and South Shields.
