= John-Baptiste Nguyễn Bửu Đồng =

Vietnamese Christian priest (1912–1968)

- Born: 1912; Nguyễn dynasty
- Died: February 4, 1968; Huế, South Vietnam
- Cause of death: Murdered by Việt Cộng during the Huế massacre
- Occupation: Catholic priest

John-Baptiste Nguyễn Phúc Bửu Đồng (1912 – February 4, 1968) was a Vietnamese Catholic priest from the city of Huế. He was murdered by the Việt Cộng during the Huế massacre, which took place during the Tết Offensive of the Vietnam War.

== Biography ==
Born as a prince of the Nguyễn dynasty, Bửu Đồng was a parish priest in a village to the east of Huế. He was a great-grandson of emperor Minh Mạng, while his father was the minister of interior during the reign of Bảo Đại. During the Vietnam War, as his area was inhabited by many Việt Cộng, he worked to stay on good terms with both them and the Army of the Republic of Vietnam. In 1967, he reportedly invited Việt Cộng guerrillas and South Vietnamese soldiers to sit together for Christmas dinner. He accepted sewing machines for his parishioners from the United States Agency for International Development.

== Death ==
On 30 January 1968—the first day of the Tết Offensive—Việt Cộng guerrillas detained Bửu Đồng and took him to a nearby pagoda for questioning, but later released him after accepting a passionate appeal by the elders of his parish. Five days later, the Việt Cộng returned and searched his rectory. Seizing his binoculars, camera, typewriter, and a picture of North Vietnamese leader Ho Chi Minh, the guerrillas took Bửu Đồng and two seminarians away. His corpse was found in Lương Viên on 8 November 1969, about 30 kilometres (19 mi) to the northeast of Huế. The bodies of two other Catholic priests were in the same grave. This location contained a series of mass graves, with a total of 20 bodies.

=== Letters ===
In his eyeglass case were three letters. One was addressed to his parents and another to his siblings and cousins. The third letter was to his parishioners:

My dearly beloved children, This is my last chance to write to you my children and remind you of the lesson of St. Peter on the boat in the storm [three words illegible] the faith. My words of greeting at this beginning of Spring are a hope that my works in the faith among you will make you remember [two words illegible] as my life is about to end by the will of God. Love one another and forgive my wrongs, thanking God with me. Ask God to forgive all my sins and remember to love and pray for me that I will live in belief and patience during difficulties to bring about the peace of Christ and serve the spirit of God and the interests of everyone in Mother Mary. Please pray that I will be serene and clear-headed and brave in every adversity of the spirit and of the body and will send my life to God through the hands of the Blessed Mother. With a promise to meet again in Heaven, I hope for grace for all of you, my children.

== See also ==
- Massacre at Huế
