= Don Nguyen =

American professional skateboarder

- Born: Portland, Oregon, U.S.
- Occupation: Professional Skateboarder
- Known for: Ollie down El Toro

Don "Nuge" Nguyen is an American professional skateboarder from Oklahoma City, Oklahoma, currently residing in California. He rides for Baker Skateboards and played Shogo Kubo in the 2005 biographical drama film Lords of Dogtown. He also played bass for American Ruse and can be seen playing bass as part of the LSDemons (along with Justin (Figgy) Figueroa and Thomas Bonilla).

== Restaurant ==
In 2021, Nguyen and restaurateur Steven Arroyo opened the first location of a smashburger eatery called Burger She Wrote in the Fairfax District of Los Angeles. A second location, in Sherman Oaks, opened in 2026, with a third planned.

== Filmography ==
Film and video
Year	Title	Company
2002	Hollywood Promo	Hollywood Skateboards
2003	Oklahomies	TDS
2003	On Video – Winter 2003	On Video Magazine
2005	Lords of Dogtown	Sony Pictures
2006	411 Video Magazine #66	411VM
2007	411 Video Magazine Volume 14, Issue 3	411VM
2007	Thrasher King of the Road 2007	Thrasher
2007	Cataclysmic Abyss	Foundation Skateboards
2012	Bake and Destroy	Baker Skateboards / Thrasher
