= Dao Minh Quan =

Vietnamese-American politician (born 1952)

President of the Provisional National Government of Vietnam
- Incumbent
- Assumed office 2018
- Preceded by: Nguyễn Trần (as Prime Minister)

Prime Minister of the Provisional National Government of Vietnam
- In office 1992–2018
- Succeeded by: Nguyễn Trần

Personal details
- Born: Đào Minh Quân; 1952 (age 73–74) Thị Nghè village, Gia Định Province, Vietnam, French Indochina
- Citizenship: United States
- Party: Independent
- Other political affiliations: Third Republic of Vietnam
- Occupation: Politician
- Vietnamese alphabet: Đào Minh Quân
- Chữ Hán: 陶明君

Dao Minh Quan (born Đào Minh Quân in 1952) is a Vietnamese-American politician. He is the 3rd President of the Third Republic of Vietnam (Vietnamese: Chính phủ quốc gia Việt Nam lâm thời), a self-claimed government in exile. He is known for starting the Vietnam New Democratic Movement.

== Early life and education ==
Quân was born in Thị Nghè village, Gia Định Province, in Vietnam to Đào Thế (father) and Nguyễn Thị Hạnh (mother). He claims to be a descendent of the Grand Prince of Trần Hưng Đạo.

He attended Phan Thanh Giản school until 1968. Quân participated in a Commando course at Sơn Trà/Non Nước military base when he was 16 years old. During the Vietnam War, he assisted Robert D. Ohman and later became the First Lieutenant of the 122nd Battalion. He was then promoted as the Lieutenant Commander of a special force unit called "Black Tiger."

In 1980, he immigrated to Los Angeles, United States with his family as political refugees. He studied Computer Programming at Rancho Santiago Community College.

== Career ==
Đào became a politician in 1971 and started the Vietnam New Democratic Movement in 1987.

Đào Minh Quân and Nguyễn Hậu, the President of the General Association of Communist Political Prisoners, created illegal files for political prisoners in Vietnam starting in 1990. This helped ARVN soldiers reunite with their families. Đào also initiated a program called C.P.A. (Comprehensive Plan of Action) to help Vietnamese refugees settle in the United States.

He was invited to the Host Committee in 1990 for the U.S. Republican Party. In 1991 he was voted as the Prime Minister of the Provisional National Government of Vietnam which was newly founded. It served as a self-proclaimed provisional government of Vietnam.

He established his political party, the Third Republic of Vietnam, on February 16, 2018. It also serves as a self-proclaimed provisional government of Vietnam. Đào was voted and elected as the Third President of the Republic of Vietnam, as also self-proclaimed; or the First President of the newly founded Third Republic of Vietnam. He was accepted and was inaugurated on November 11, 2018, in Adelanto, California.

Đào has received two diplomatic notes from former American President Bill Clinton. The Provisional Government of Ukraine also invited him to give a speech at the congress of the Soviet Union. On October 15, 2010, U.S. Representative Gary Miller and Edward Nixon invited Đào as Prime Minister of the Provisional National Government of Vietnam to claim sovereignty in the South China Sea at the Nixon Library.

Đào built a tributary monument named called the Hexagon Monument as a tribute to the US government, military, and the American people.

== Controversy ==
Đào's political party has been designated as a terrorist organization by the website of the Ministry of Public Security in Vietnam.

Members of Đào's political party have appeared in the People's Court of Ho Chi Minh City on the crime of overthrowing the Government of Vietnam, including a bombing and arson at a police facility and an unsuccessful bombing attempt at an airport, presumably Tan Son Nhat International Airport.

== Political affiliations ==
Third Republic of Vietnam
- Đệ Tam Việt Nam Cộng hòa Motto: Lấy lại đất tổ, không làm khổ dân "Regain the ancestral lands, end the populace's suffering" Anthem: Tiếng Gọi Công Dân ("Call to the citizens")
- Seal of the Third republic of Vietnam

- Flag

- Territory claimed by the Third Republic of Vietnam
- Predecessor: Government of South Vietnam
- Formation: October 21, 1990; 36 years ago
- Founded at: Little Saigon, Orange County, California
- Type: Government-in-Exile
- Purpose: Remove the Socialist Republic of Viet Nam from power and re establish the Republic of Vietnam
- Headquarters: Little Saigon, Orange County, California
- Location: United States of America
- Region served: United States and Vietnam
- Official language: Vietnamese, English
- President: Đào Minh Quân
- Website: www.chinhphuquocgia.com
- Formerly called: Provisional National Government of Vietnam

He is affiliated to the Third Republic of Vietnam (Vietnamese: Đệ Tam Việt Nam Cộng Hòa, abbreviated DTVNCH), also referred to by its previous name the Provisional National Government of Vietnam (Vietnamese: Chính phủ Quốc gia Việt Nam Lâm thời), a self-proclaimed government in exile, headquartered in the Little Saigon neighborhood of Orange County, California, with offices in other Little Saigon communities.

=== History of the organization ===
The Provisional National Government of Vietnam was formed by former soldiers and refugees from the former South Vietnamese regime on 21 October 1990 and was officially founded on 16 February 1991, led by Prime Minister Đào Minh Quân, who was elected by some of the Vietnamese representatives in the United States. He succeeded Nguyen Tran who was elected as Prime Minister previously. It was ruled by the New Democratic Party of Vietnam.

In November 2018, Prime Minister Đào Minh Quân was reelected as the new President of the newly created Third Republic of Vietnam. The inauguration ceremony was held at the base in Adelanto and at the Hilton Hotel. Participants came from numerous countries, including Australia and Vietnam (see Anti-communism in Vietnam). During the ceremony, the US government's staff gave speeches and expressed hope that the newly elected president would work closely with the US. Also in the same year, the communist Vietnamese government listed this foundation as a terrorist foundation, citing the reason due to the 2018 bombings.

=== Activities of the organization ===
In January 2018, the government in exile was labeled by the Vietnamese Ministry of Public Security as a "terrorist organization", citing the group's alleged responsibility in numerous plans to commit acts of "terrorism, sabotage, and assassination" of government officials.

People affiliated with the organization have been arrested and convicted in Vietnam of conspiracy to overthrow the Communist government and of attempted arson and unsuccessful bombings at a police facility and an airport (presumably Tan Son Nhat Intl.). Several political activists received prison sentences of up to 14 years.
