= Huong Keenleyside =

Vietnamese-born British novelist

- Born: Nguyễn Thị Hương

Huong Keenleyside (born Nguyễn Thị Hương) is a Vietnamese-born British novelist.

She was born in Hanoi to Vietnamese parents. Hương originally followed in her father's path to open a tailor shop at the age of 17. She moved to the United Kingdom in 1998, to her husband's home county of Yorkshire, and established a new fashion business.

She has written three books, and her 1994 book, Secrets of the Soul, was a best seller in Vietnam. In 2010 she was working on a book that centered on names of children from a historical point.

Keenleyside donates the proceeds from her writings to help people in Vietnam.

== Selected publications ==
- Secrets of [the] soul (Hanoi, 1994)
- Keenleyside, Hương (2006). Điệp viên 022 : tiẻ̂u thuyé̂t (Spy 002) (in Vietnamese). Đà Nã̆ng: Nhà Xuât Bản Đà Nã̆ng. OCLC 183208642.
- Keenleyside, Hương (2006). Cầu vòng ở Irắc : tập truyện ngắn ('Rainbow in Iraq') (in Vietnamese). [Hà Nội]: Nhà xuá̂t bản Hội nhà văn. OCLC 122275411.
- Keenleyside, Huong (2007). For the love of Vietnam. London: Janus Publishing Co. ISBN 978-1-85756-603-1. OCLC 427608832.
- Keenleyside, Hương (2010). Tủ sách lịch sử dành cho giáo viên và học sinh (in Vietnamese). [Hải Phòng]: Nhà xuất bản Hải Phòng. OCLC 740722203.
