= People's Action Party of Vietnam =

People's Action Party of Vietnam Đảng Nhân Dân Hành Động Việt Nam
- Chairman: Nguyen Si Binh
- Vice Chairman: Nguyen Xuan Ngai
- Founded: 18 January 1991
- Ideology: Vietnamese nationalism; Anti-communism; Conservatism

Party flag

Website
- http://www.dndhd.org (defunct)

The People's Action Party of Vietnam (Vietnamese: Đảng Nhân Dân Hành Động Việt Nam) is a Vietnamese anti-communist organization in-exile that is based in the United States. The organization's chairman is Nguyen Si Binh and its vice chairman is Dr. Nguyen Xuan Ngai.

Founded in 1991, PAP's goals are to unite the people of Vietnam with a democratic government and reform government programs in education, health care, economy, and human rights.

They established offices in Cambodia, but their officials were arrested and transferred to Vietnam for prosecution. They have actively tried to gain support in Vietnam, but 21 of their supporters were detained by the government without trial for more than two years.
