= Government of Free Vietnam =

Self-proclaimed government in exile

Government of Free Vietnam Chính Phủ Lâm Thời Việt Nam Tự Do
- 1995–2013
- Flag
- Anthem: Tiếng Gọi Công Dân ("Call to the citizens")
- Status: Government-in-exile
- Capital: Garden Grove, California, U.S. Missouri City, Texas, U.S.
- Official languages: Vietnamese
- President
  - 1995–2005: Nguyen Huu Chanh (first)
  - 2005–2013: Nguyễn Khánh (last)

Republic established
- History
  - Established: 30 April 1995
  - Disestablished: 2013
- Website www.gfvn.org

The Government of Free Vietnam (GFVN; Vietnamese: Chính phủ Lâm thời Việt Nam Tự do) was an anti-communist political organization that was established 30 April 1995 by Nguyen Hoang Dan. It was dissolved in 2013. It claimed to be an unrecognized government in exile of the Republic of Vietnam headquartered in the U.S. cities of Garden Grove, California, and Missouri City, Texas.

== Organization ==
=== Political goals ===
The Government of Free Vietnam had stated a list of the political goals of its organization:

1. The stated goal of the Provisional National Government of Vietnam is to achieve free and democratic elections in Vietnam. The government seeks to create an atmosphere of non-violent pressure on the Communist's regime to allow for an election process whereby the people can choose whether or not to retain communism as the preferred system of governance.
2. Provisional National Government of Vietnam has extolled before that achieving a fair and evenhanded oil policy for the benefit of the citizens of Vietnam and other businesses of the world can be achieved without violence and undeterred by the corrupt communist government practices.
3. Free market ideas we wish to incorporate into the culture of Vietnam that helps all processes.
4. A fair opportunity to use Vietnam's national maritime oil resource and free waterways.
5. A prevention of possible clashes of Vietnam's neighboring countries due to illegal controls and restrictions.
6. The aggravated communist criminals must be brought to justice and that they must be ordered to pay for the consequences of their crimes, for the world to know and set examples for those tyrannical regimes against humanities.
7. Prohibit all forms of provocation, and re-establish South Vietnam countrywide.

=== Economy ===
The GFVN had an approximate budget of US$1 million a year, donated by overseas Vietnamese anti-communists around the world..

== Base in Cambodia ==
KC-702 was a military base that was operated by the Provisional Government of Free Vietnam, probably located in Cambodia, near the Vietnamese border. It is believed that this was once used to help plan the failed Vietnamese Embassy bombing in Laos. The current status of the camp is not known. However, in 1999 several members of the group were captured in Cambodia with weapons, deported to Vietnam and charged.

== See also ==
- Third Republic of Vietnam (Provisional National Government of Vietnam)
- Chhun Yasith, leader of the Cambodian Freedom Fighters
- Vang Pao, a Major General in the Royal Lao Army, a leader in the Hmong American community in the United States
- Khmers Kampuchea-Krom Federation
- Montagnard Foundation, Inc.
- Nationalist Party of Greater Vietnam
- People's Action Party of Vietnam
- Vietnamese Constitutional Monarchist League
- List of governments in exile
