= Dale E. Stovall =

United States Air Force general

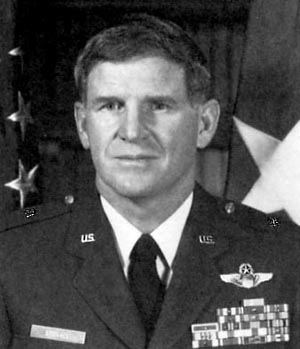
- Born: February 19, 1944 (age 82); Toppenish, Washington
- Military career
- Allegiance: United States
- Branch: United States Air Force
- Service years: 1962–1993
- Rank: Brigadier General
- Conflicts: Vietnam War
- Awards: Air Force Cross; Silver Star (2); Distinguished Flying Cross (2); Jabara Award

Dale Emery Stovall (born February 19, 1944) is a retired brigadier general in the United States Air Force who figured prominently in several search and rescue operations during the Vietnam War. A member of the 40th Aerospace Rescue and Recovery Squadron based in Thailand, on June 2, 1972, he recovered Captain Roger Locher from deep inside North Vietnam, the deepest rescue made during the entire Vietnam War. For his efforts in rescuing Locher, Stovall was awarded the Air Force Cross, which described how "he willingly returned to this high threat area, braving intense ground fire, to recover the downed airman from deep in North Vietnam.". Stovall was also recognized with the 1973 Jabara Award for Airmanship, two Silver Star awards and two Distinguished Flying Cross awards for other combat rescues among the 12 successful rescue missions he accomplished during his tour in Southeast Asia. Stovall retired from the Air Force as a brigadier general on June 1, 1993.

== Background ==
Stovall was born in Toppenish, Washington, and enlisted with the US Air Force in June 1962. The following year, he was accepted to the U.S. Air Force Academy at Colorado Springs, Colorado, and graduated with the class of 1967.

Stovall was an All-American sprinter for the Air Force Falcons track and field team. At the 1966 NCAA indoor track and field championships, he finished 3rd in the 440 yards with a time of 48.7 seconds.

=== Rescue of Roger Locher ===
During the initial phase of Operation Linebacker in May 1972, a USAF F-4D was shot down by a North Vietnamese Shenyang J-6. Pilot Major Robert Lodge refused to eject, but his weapons officer Captain Roger Locher was able to get out of the aircraft. Locher landed, unseen by either friendly or enemy forces, only 64 kilometres (40 mi) from Hanoi, North Vietnam.

Locher evaded capture and covered over 19 kilometres (12 mi), gradually losing 30 pounds (14 kg) and his strength. On June 1, 1972, his 22nd day behind enemy lines, he was finally able to contact a flight of American jets overhead, calling, "Any U.S. aircraft, if you read Oyster 1 Bravo, come up on Guard". Lieutenant James Dunn and others, including Captain Steve Ritchie in one of the F-4 aircraft overhead, heard his radio call and remembered Locher's call sign. When the aircraft answered, Locher calmly responded, "Guys I've been down here a long time, any chance of picking me up?" His transmissions left some Americans who did not hear his call in doubt about the authenticity of his message, and they believed that the People's Army of Vietnam may have manipulated a POW into impersonating him, setting a trap for the would-be rescuers.

=== Rescue operation ===
Captain Stovall, based at Nakhon Phanom Royal Thai Navy Base in Thailand responded, piloting a HH-53 from the 40th Aerospace Rescue and Recovery Squadron along with a rescue force consisting of several A-1Hs and another HH-53. As they neared Locher's position, the A-1 Skyraiders and HH-53C helicopters came under attack from two MiGs, several surface-to-air missiles and gunfire. The rescue force eluded one MiG in a narrow canyon, but were eventually driven back by the enemy fire and failed to get through to Locher on June 1.

On June 2, 1972, General John Vogt, commander of the 7th Air Force canceled the entire strike mission set for Hanoi on that day. He sent a task force of 119 aircraft including Stovall piloting his HH-53, bombers, and an array of F-4 escorts, EB-66s, A-1Hs, F-105G Weasels, and KC135 tankers to get Locher out. "We shut down the war to go get Roger Locher," Stovall later said.

Captain Ronald E. Smith in an A-1H guided Stovall to Locher's position. Only when Locher rose out of the jungle canopy riding the jungle penetrator were all of the Americans sure it was him. Despite their proximity to Yên Bái Air Base, no aircraft were lost during Locher's rescue. At only 60 miles (97 km) from Hanoi, it was the deepest rescue inside North Vietnam during the Vietnam War.

== Awards and decorations ==

USAF Command pilot badge
Air Force Cross		Silver Star with bronze oak leaf cluster
Defense Superior Service Medal	Legion of Merit with bronze oak leaf cluster	Distinguished Flying Cross with "V" device and bronze oak leaf cluster
Meritorious Service Medal with bronze oak leaf cluster	Air Medal with silver oak leaf cluster	Air Force Commendation Medal
Air Force Presidential Unit Citation with bronze oak leaf cluster	Air Force Outstanding Unit Award with two bronze oak leaf clusters	National Defense Service Medal with service star
Armed Forces Expeditionary Medal	Vietnam Service Medal with three bronze campaign stars	Air Force Overseas Long Tour Service Ribbon
Air Force Overseas Short Tour Service Ribbon	Air Force Longevity Service Award with silver and bronze oak leaf clusters	Small Arms Expert Marksmanship Ribbon with bronze star
Air Force Training Ribbon	Republic of Vietnam Gallantry Cross	Republic of Vietnam Campaign Medal

=== Silver Star ===
Silver Star ribbon

Capt Stovall was recognized on several occasions for his bravery during the Vietnam War. He received the Silver Star for actions on March 2, 1972. The citation reads in part:

...Captain Stovall with superior airmanship and personal courage, repeatedly volunteered to fly as co-pilot of an HH-53C helicopter into an extremely hostile area in the rescue of a downed airman. While under intense ground fire, Captain Stovall correctly analyzed an in-flight emergency, maintained vital communications with the Search and Rescue forces, insured that all required checks were performed, and was an indispensable aid in assisting the pilot in avoiding hazardous areas...

Three months later, on June 27, 1972, he was instrumental in recovering another air man for which he was awarded the Silver Star with Bronze Oak Leaf Cluster:

...Captain Stovall, as Aircraft Commander of an HH-53C Rescue Helicopter, voluntarily and at great risk to his own life piloted his aircraft into a hostile and heavily defended area of North Vietnam to effect the rescue of a downed American airman. Realizing the primary recovery aircraft had suffered crippling battle damage, he piloted his aircraft through intense hostile ground fire to complete the rescue of an injured survivor and crewman from encircled ground forces...

=== Air Force Cross ===
Air Force Cross

For his flights on two days deep inside North Vietnam on June 1 and 2, 1972, to rescue Maj. Lochar, Stovall received the Air Force Cross on November 22, 1972:

...for extraordinary heroism in military operations against an opposing armed force as an Aircraft Commander of an HH-53C rescue helicopter of the 40th Aerospace Rescue and Recovery Squadron, Nakhon Phanom Royal Thai Air Base, Thailand, in action in Southeast Asia from 1 June 1972 to 2 June 1972. During this period, Captain Stovall, voluntarily and at great risk to his own life, repeatedly penetrated an extremely hostile and heavily defended area to effect the rescue of a downed American airman. Captain Stovall's first attempt to rescue the airman was thwarted by numerous hostile aircraft and missiles being directed at the rescue force. Determined to save this airman, he willingly returned to this high threat area, braving intense ground fire, to recover the downed airman from deep in North Vietnam...

=== Distinguished Flying Cross ===
Distinguished Flying Cross ribbon

On April 13, 1972, Stovall assisted in rescuing a Marine Corps pilot for which he received the Distinguished Flying Cross. The citation reads in part:

...Captain Stovall voluntarily participated in the rescue of a downed Marine pilot from deep within hostile territory. Braving intense anti-aircraft artillery, he defiantly orbited his aircraft for over forty minutes in this extremely hostile area to assist in the successful recovery of the downed pilot.

Stovall was recognized again six months later on December 6, 1972, and received the Distinguished Flying Cross with Bronze Oak Leaf Cluster.

...Captain Stovall's job knowledge, outstanding airmanship, and continuous professionalism, displayed under the constant threat of hostile fire and adverse weather conditions, immeasurably aided in recovery of a downed American airman...

=== Peacetime awards ===
Defense Superior Service Medal ribbon

Legion of Merit ribbon

During peacetime he was recognized with the Defense Superior Service Medal, the Legion of Merit with one Bronze Oak Leaf Cluster, the Meritorious Service Medal with one Bronze Oak Leaf cluster and the Air Force Commendation Medal.
