= 40th Helicopter Squadron =

US Air Force helicopter unit

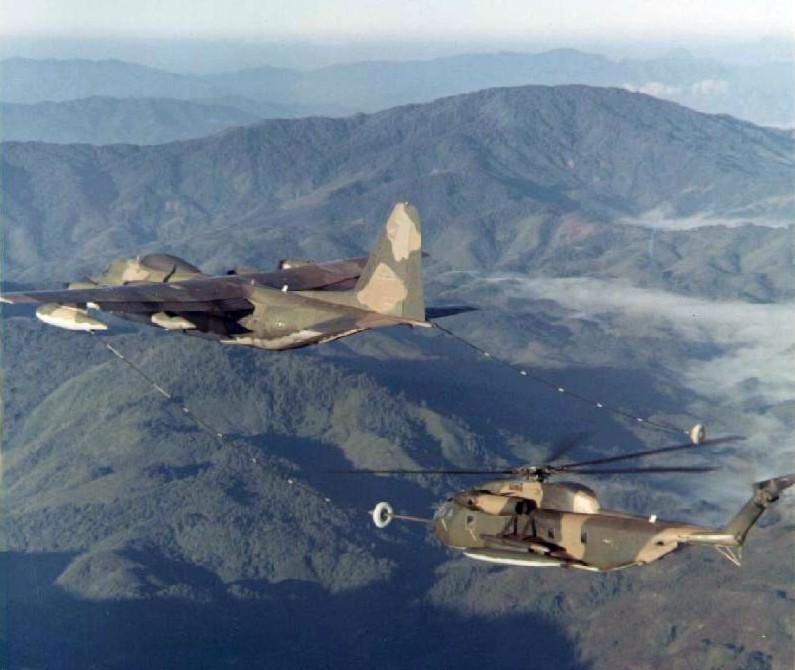
- A squadron HH-53B refueling from an HC-130P over North Vietnam, 1969–70
- Active: 1968–1976; 1978–1987; 1993–present
- Country: United States
- Branch: United States Air Force
- Role: Combat search and rescue ICBM Defense; Medical evacuation Personnel recovery
- Size: Squadron
- Part of: Air Force Global Strike Command
- Garrison/HQ: Malmstrom Air Force Base, Montana
- Nickname: Pathfinders
- Mottos: Save (1968-1987) Deter, Detect, and Defend (2003-present)
- Colors: Blue, Yellow, White
- Engagements: Vietnam War: Operation Ivory Coast; Operation Eagle Pull; Operation Frequent Wind

Insignia
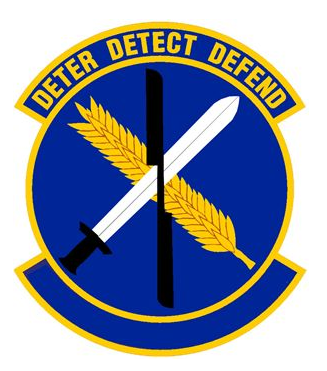
- 40th Helicopter Squadron emblem (Note: Approved 10 July 2003.)

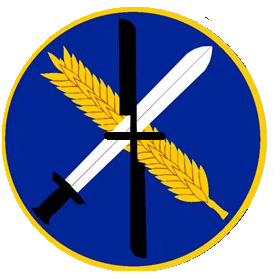
- 40th Aerospace Rescue & Recovery Squadron emblem

Aircraft flown
- Multirole helicopter: Boeing MH-139A Grey Wolf
- Utility helicopter: Bell UH-1N Twin Huey

The 40th Helicopter Squadron is a missile support unit of the United States Air Force assigned to the 582d Helicopter Group in support of the 341st Missile Wing located at Malmstrom Air Force Base, Montana. The unit is tasked with flight operations in support of the operation and security of Malmstrom's intercontinental ballistic missile complex as well as search and rescue missions. The unit operates the Boeing MH-139A Grey Wolf helicopter.

As the 40th Aerospace Rescue and Recovery Squadron it was a helicopter combat search and rescue squadron during the Vietnam War.

== History ==
=== Vietnam War ===
The squadron was activated as the 40th Aerospace Rescue and Recovery Squadron at Udorn Royal Thai Air Force Base in March 1968 with Sikorsky HH-3 Jolly Green Giants which were nicknamed "Nitnoy." Later Sikorsky HH-53 Super Jollys arrived and these were nicknamed "BUFF."

In March 1968, Detachment 2 of the 37th Aerospace Rescue and Recovery Squadron at Udorn RTAFB operating HH-3s and HH-53Bs, was transferred to the 40th ARRS.

The 40th moved to Nakhon Phanom Royal Thai Air Force Base on 21 July 1971.

20 August 1972, the local base rescue detachments of the 3d Aerospace Rescue and Recovery Group each operating 2 Kaman HH-43 Huskies were transferred to the 40th, comprising:

- Detachment 2 Takhli Royal Thai Air Force Base
- Detachment 3 Ubon Royal Thai Air Force Base
- Detachment 4 Korat Royal Thai Air Force Base
- Detachment 5 Udorn Korat Royal Thai Air Force Base
- Detachment 12 U-Tapao Royal Thai Naval Airfield
- Detachment 14 Tan Son Nhut Air Base

30 November 1972, with the inactivation of the 37th Aerospace Rescue and Recovery Squadron at Danang Air Base, 5 of its HH-53s were transferred to the 40th, while its two HH-43s remained at Danang as Detachment 7 of the 40th ARRS to provide base combat search and rescue during Operation Linebacker II.

Following the Paris Peace Accords all remaining US Forces were withdrawn from South Vietnam by 27 March 1973. Detachment 7 at Danang Air Base and Detachment 14 at Tan Son Nhut Air Base were inactivated during this period. Following the withdrawal from South Vietnam the 40th's force level was 11 HH-53s and 14 HH-43s.

The USAF continued combat operations over Cambodia until 15 August 1973 and the 40th provided combat search and rescue support during this period. Following the end of combat operations the 40th kept 2 HH-53s at Nakhon Phanom on 15-minute alert during daylight and 45-minute alert at night.

In July 1974 Detachment 10 at Takhli was discontinued, followed in August by Detachment 3 at Ubon. On 20 February 1975, Detachment 1 at Nakhon Phanom was discontinued. At this time the 40th's force level had dropped to 8 HH-53Cs and 4 HH-43Fs.

The 40th moved to Korat Royal Thai Air Force Base on 1 October 1975. On 15 October 1975 with the inactivation of the 56th Aerospace Rescue and Recovery Squadron its four Lockheed HC-130P Combat Kings joined the 40th. On 31 January 1976 the squadron was inactivated at Korat RTAFB.

==== Operations and losses ====
- 30 May 1968, Jolly Green, an HH-3E was attempting to rescue Colonel Norman Phillips the pilot of a downed Republic F-105 Thunderchief, near Savannakhet, Laos. Pararescueman Sergeant Thomas A Newman descended into a hostile jungle environment to rescue the pilot. Hampered by darkness and concentrated automatic weapons fire, Newman requested the rescue helicopter to enter a nearby orbit, both for the safety of the crewmembers and to prevent the hovering aircraft from establishing their location for the unfriendly ground forces. When the HH-3 returned, he secured the injured Philips to the forest penetrator and protected him with his own body as they ascended to the helicopter. Newman was awarded the Air Force Cross.
- 25 December 1968, Jolly Green 17, an HH-3E was attempting to rescue Major Charles R Brownlee, the pilot of Panda 01 an F-105 shot down near Ban Lathama, Mahaxia District, Khammouan Province, Laos. Pararescueman Airman First Class Charles Douglas King descended by rescue hoist to rescue the injured pilot. With the pilot attached to the hoist, the HH-3E and King were hit by enemy fire, seriously injured, King instructed the helicopter to depart. King was posthumously awarded the Air Force Cross. The bodies of King and Brownlee were not recovered and both were listed as killed in action - body not recovered.
- 18 January 1969, Jolly Green 67, HH-53B, 66-14430, was hit by ground fire while on a Combat search and rescue mission for Sandy 02, a Douglas A-1H Skyraider lost the previous day. Helicopter made an emergency landing 15 km southeast of Tchepone, Laos. The crew and the A-1 pilot were rescued by Jolly Green 70. An airstrike was ordered to destroy JG-67
- 28 January 1970, Jolly Green 71, HH-53B, 66-14434, on a CSAR mission for the pilot of Seabird 02, an F-105G, was shot down by a missile fired from a Mig-21 piloted by Vu Ngoc Dinh of the 921st Fighter Regiment. The 6-man crew were all killed.
- 30 June 1970, Jolly Green 54, HH-53C, 66-8283, was on a CSAR mission for the crew of Nail 44 an OV-10A, over Savannakhet, Laos. Abandoning the first rescue attempt due to heavy fire, the pilot Captain Leroy C Schaneberg decided to make a second rescue attempt. JG54 was hit by ground fire and crashed. The 5-man crew were all killed. The crash site was excavated in December 1993 and remains were identified as a group on 7 March 1995. Schaneberg was posthumously awarded the Air Force Cross.

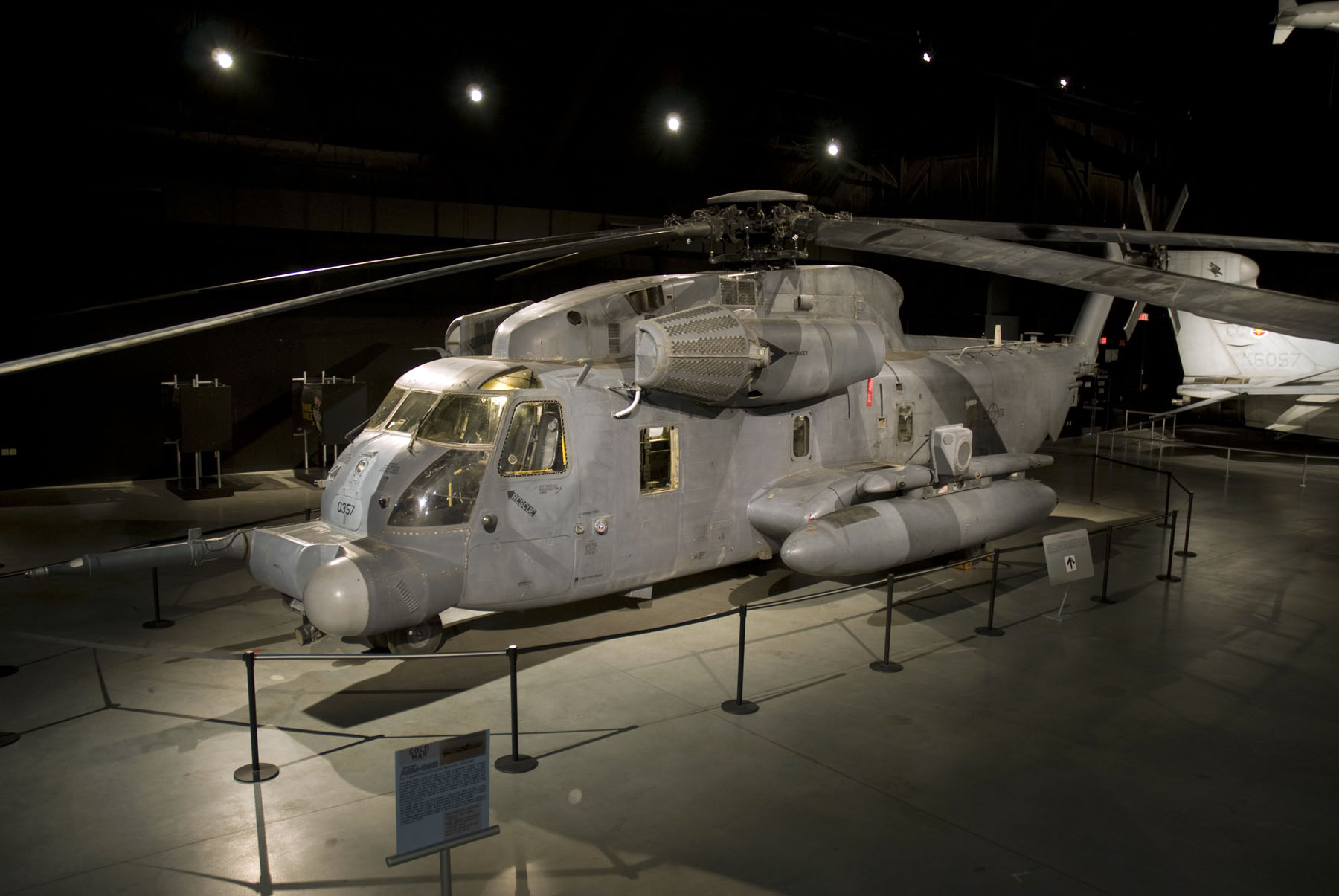
HH-53B of the 40th ARRS which participated in the Son Tay Raid

(Note: Aircraft, serial 68-10357, is pictured after it was converted to an MH-53M Pave Low IV. During the Son Tay raid its call sign was Apple 1. It is on display at the National Museum of the United States Air Force.)

- 21 November 1970, 5 of the squadron's HH-53s took part in Operation Ivory Coast, the raid on the Son Tay prisoner of war camp.
- 21 June 1971, Jolly Green 54, HH-53, 66–8285, was shot down over Laos while attempting to recover an AQM-34 Buffalo Hunter drone. Crew were all rescued.

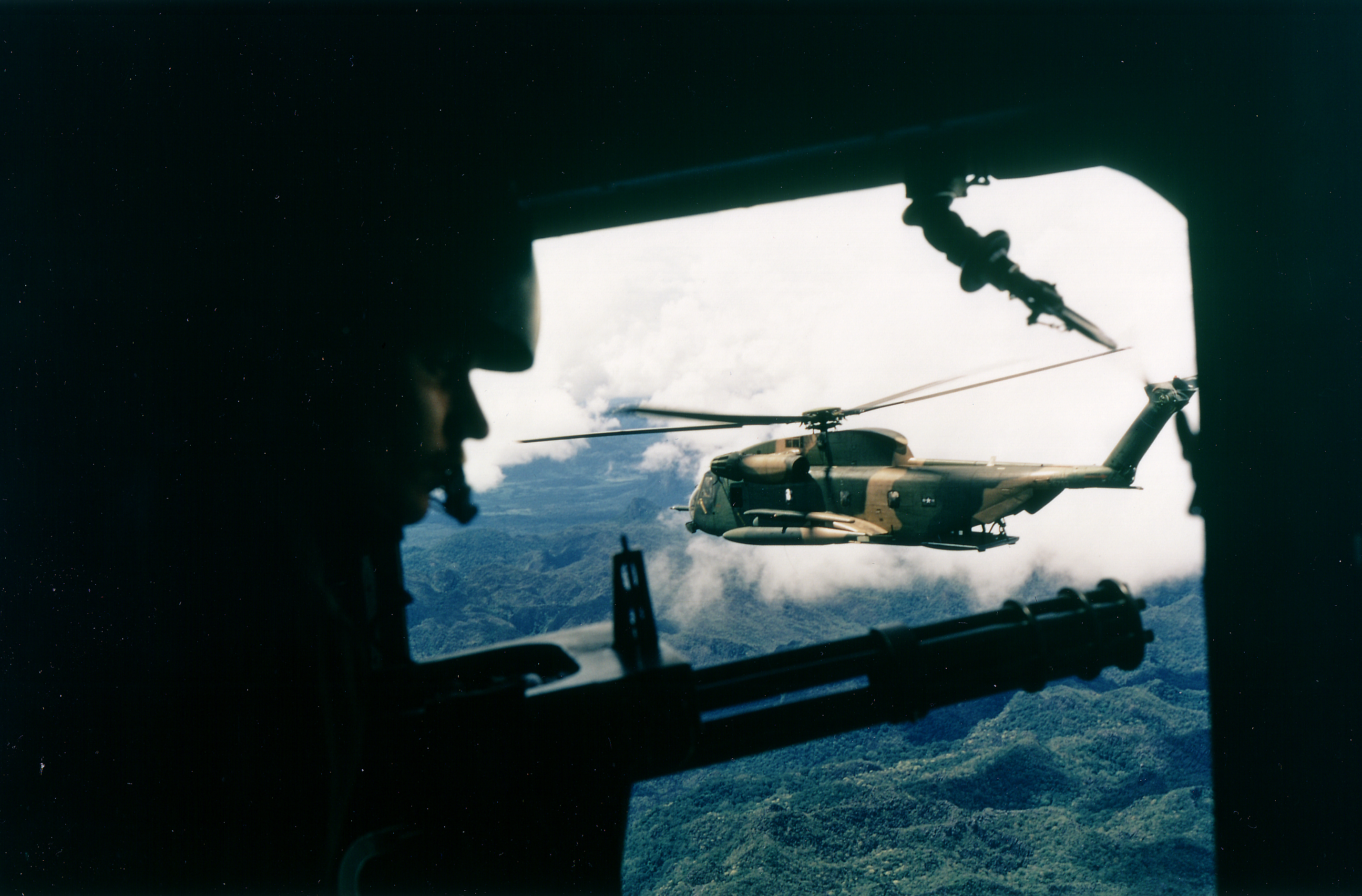
Squadron HH-53 as seen from a 21st SOS CH-53 in 1972

- 27 March 1972, Jolly Green 61, HH-53C, 66-10359, crashed over Stoeng Treng Province, Cambodia, about 10 miles (16 km) southeast of Siem Pang District due to unknown causes. A pararescueman was lowered to the ground at the site of the crash to check for survivors, but due to the intense heat from the burning helicopter, he could not approach near enough to determine if there were crew members inside the aircraft. Some three hours later a second rescue specialist was deployed in the immediate area, who reported the wreckage was still burning, precluding close inspection. The 5-man crew were all killed in action - body not recovered.
- 13 April 1972, Captain Bennie D Orrell pilot of a Jolly Green, rescued a downed pilot near Tchepone, Laos. Orrell was awarded the Air Force Cross.
- 2 June 1972, Captain Dale E. Stovall pilot of a Jolly Green, flew through intense hostile ground fire to complete the rescue of Captain Roger Locher, a McDonnell F-4 Phantom II copilot who had evaded capture for 23 days after being shot down in North Vietnam. This rescue was the deepest CSAR mission into North Vietnam and took place 8 km northeast of Yên Bái Air Base, one of the most active Vietnamese People's Air Force MiG airfields. Stovall was awarded a Bronze Oak leaf cluster in lieu of a second award of Silver Star. Stovall was also awarded the 1973 Jabara Award for Airmanship.
- 27 June 1972, Pararescueman Sergeant Charles D. McGrath was on a CSAR mission on Jolly Green 77 over North Vietnam. While penetrating dense jungle to rescue F-4 crewman, Captain Lynn A. Aikman, who had a broken leg, knee, elbow and jaw, McGrath exposed himself to intense ground fire in order to drag the incapacitated Aikman to a suitable recovery area. Seeing JG73 crippled by the hostile fire, he directed air strikes against surrounding hostile ground forces until he was able to secure CAikman and himself to the penetrator of Jolly Green 57, the backup helicopter. Rising through constant accurate ground fire, he shielded Aikman with his own body until they were successfully recovered. McGrath and the pilot Captain Dale Stovall were both awarded the Air Force Cross.
- 27 December 1972, Jolly Green 73, HH-53C, 69-5788, on a CSAR mission for crew of Jackel 33, an F-111A downed on 22 December 1972 over North Vietnam, lost its fuel probe due to enemy ground fire and crash-landed due to fuel starvation. JG-73 was then destroyed by an A-7D Corsair.
- 14 June 1973, Jolly Green 64, HH-53C, 66-10362, lost its tail rotor and crashed into the Tonle Sap, Cambodia. 3 of the crew were killed and 2 were rescued.
- 12 April 1975 the squadron supported Operation Eagle Pull, the evacuation of Phnom Penh, Cambodia.
- 29–30 April 1975, 2 of the squadron's HH-53s operating from USS Midway took part in Operation Frequent Wind, the evacuation of Saigon.
- 15 May 1975, 7 of the squadron's HH-53s participated in the recapture of the SS Mayaguez.

=== Missile defense operations ===
On 10 August 2026, the 40th Helicopter Squadron reached initial operational capability with the Boeing MH-139 Grey Wolf, replacing its Bell UH-1N Twin Hueys. It had flown its first operational mission with the Grey Wolf in January.

== Lineage ==
- Constituted as the 40th Aerospace Rescue & Recovery Squadron, activated and organized on 21 March 1968

Inactivated on 31 January 1976
Activated on 1 July 1978
Inactivated on 31 December 1987

- Redesignated 40th Rescue Flight on 1 April 1993

Activated on 1 May 1993

- Redesignated 40th Helicopter Flight on 1 May 1998
- Redesignated 40th Helicopter Squadron on 11 October 2005

=== Assignments ===
- 3d Aerospace Rescue and Recovery Group: 21 March 1968
- 41st Aerospace Rescue and Recovery Wing (later 41st Rescue and Weather Reconnaissance Wing): 20 August 1972 – 31 January 1976
- 39th Aerospace Rescue and Recovery Wing: 1 July 1978 – 31 December 1987
- 341st Operations Group: 1 May 1993
- 582d Helicopter Group: 5 January 2015

=== Detachments ===
- Detachment 1, Nakhon Phanom RTAFB, Thailand: 18 March 1968 – 1 July 1971

Detachment 1, Homestead Air Force Base, Florida: 8 January 1981 – 1 October 1985

- Detachment 3, Ubon RTAFB, Thailand: 20 August 1972 – 20 August 1974
- Detachment 4, Hill Air Force Base, Utah: 1 July 1978 – 31 December 1987
- Detachment 5, Udorn RTAFB, Thailand: 20 August 1972 – 30 September 1975
- Detachment 5, Edwards Air Force Base, California: 1 July 1978 – 31 December 1987
- Detachment 6 Holloman Air Force Base, New Mexico: 1 July 1978 – 31 December 1987
- Detachment 7 Da Nang Air Base, South Vietnam: 11 December 1972 – 10 February 1973
- Detachment 8 Takhli RTAFB, Thailand: c. Dec 1972 – 31 January 1973
- Detachment 10 Takhli RTAFB, Thailand: 31 January 1973 – 30 July 1974
- Detachment 10 MacDill Air Force Base, Florida: 8 January 1981 – 31 March 1981
- Detachment 12 U-Tapao RTAFB, Thailand: 20 August 1972 – 31 January 1976
- Detachment 14 Tan Son Nhut Air Base, South Vietnam: 15 September 1972 – 10 February 1973
- Detachment 18 Plattsburgh Air Force Base, New York: 8 January 1981 – 30 November 1987
- Detachment 22 Mountain Home Air Force Base, Idaho: 1 July 1978 – 30 November 1987
- Detachment 24 Fairchild Air Force Base, Washington: 1 July 1978 – 30 November 1987

=== Stations ===
- Udorn Royal Thai Air Force Base, Thailand, 21 March 1968
- Nakhon Phanom Royal Thai Air Force Base, Thailand, 28 July 1971
- Korat Royal Thai Air Force Base, Thailand, 15 September 1975 – 31 January 1976
- Hill Air Force Base, Utah, 1 July 1978 – 31 December 1987
- Malmstrom Air Force Base, Montana, 1 May 1993 – present

== Aircraft ==
- Sikorsky HH-3 Jolly Green Giant (1967–1969)
- Kaman HH-43 Huskie (1972–1976)
- Sikorsky HH-53B/C Super Jolly (1968–1976)
- Lockheed HC-130P Combat King (1975–1976)
- Bell UH-1N Twin Huey (1973–present)
- Boeing MH-139A Grey Wolf (2024–present)
