= Roger Locher =

U.S. Air Force officer (born 1946)

Roger Clinton Locher
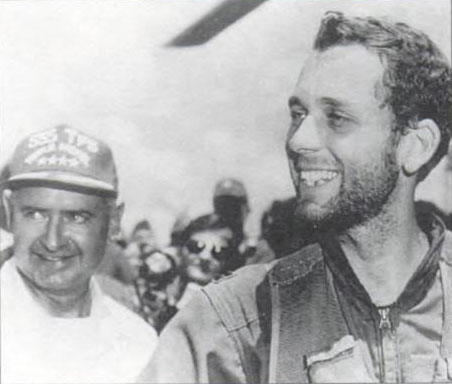
- General John Vogt (L) with Capt Roger Locher on his return to Udorn Royal Thai Air Force Base
- Born: September 13, 1946 (age 79); Sabetha, Kansas, U.S.
- Allegiance: United States of America
- Branch: United States Air Force
- Service years: 1969–1998
- Rank: Colonel
- Conflicts: Vietnam War

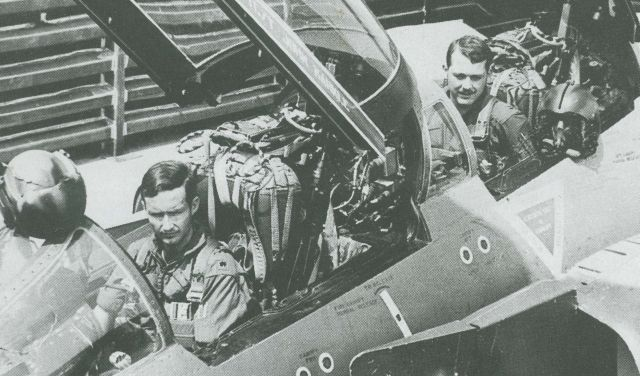
Maj. Robert Lodge (left) and Capt. Roger Locher (right) in the cockpit of F-4D 65–0784, seen earlier in 1972: the team already had two MiG-kills to their credit when they clashed with MiG-19s and MiG-21s on the morning of May 10, 1972.

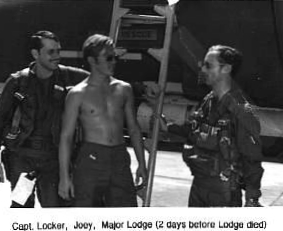
Roger Locher, Crew Chief Sgt Joey Hill, Robert Lodge, F4-D 650784

Roger Clinton Locher (born September 13, 1946) is a retired Colonel in the U.S. Air Force and a former McDonnell Douglas F-4D Phantom II Navigator/Weapon Systems Officer (WSO) and subsequent Pilot who, during Operation Linebacker in the Vietnam War, was shot down only 40 miles (64 km) from Hanoi, North Vietnam. The 23 days Locher spent behind enemy lines evading capture was a record for downed airmen during the war. USAF General John W. Vogt, Jr., commanding general of the Seventh Air Force, "shut down the war" and sent 119 aircraft to recover him. His rescue was the deepest inside North Vietnam during the entire War.

When his aircraft, F-4D, AF Ser. No. 65-0784, was shot down by a Shenyang J-6 on May 10, 1972, Locher was on his third combat tour and had over 407 combat missions. He was one of the leading MiG killers in Vietnam with three aerial victories. No one saw him eject or his parachute open, and it was unknown whether he had died or been captured. Over the next two weeks, U.S. air crews in the area tried to raise him on UHF radio without success. The North Vietnamese did not add his name to the roster of captured airmen, which gave the Americans some hope. Traveling only at dusk and dawn, over three weeks Locher traveled about 12 miles (19 km), evading farmers and living off the land.

On June 1, Locher was finally able to successfully contact a flight of F-4 aircraft overhead. Vogt committed to rescue him and canceled the scheduled attack on Hanoi that day, diverting all of the available aircraft to assist in his rescue. Despite the proximity of the Yên Bái Air Base only 5 miles (8.0 km) away and its well-developed anti-aircraft defenses, there were no U.S. losses during his rescue.

== Recruitment and training ==
Locher attended Kansas State University, where he participated in Air Force ROTC program, and was commissioned as a 2d Lieutenant in the Air Force in 1969. He completed undergraduate navigator training at Mather Air Force Base, California and was assigned to fly the F-4 Phantom II as a Weapon Systems Officer (WSO) in the rear seat of this principal fighter aircraft of the U.S. Air Force, U.S. Navy and U.S. Marine Corps. He received transition training at Davis–Monthan Air Force Base, Arizona, and was then sent to the "Triple Nickel", the 555th Tactical Fighter Squadron of the 432d Tactical Reconnaissance Wing at Udorn Royal Thai Air Force Base, Thailand.

== MiGCAP patrol ==
On February 21, 1972, Locher took part in the first U.S. Air Force aerial victory in four years at night over northeast Laos, about 90 miles (140 km) southwest of Hanoi. Major Robert A. Lodge was pilot and Locher was the weapon systems officer in an F-4D flying combat air patrol to interdict Vietnam People's Air Force (VPAF) MiGs (MIGCAP). The two men were the most experienced crew in Southeast Asia. Red Crown, the call sign for the radar-equipped USS Long Beach stationed in the northern part of the Gulf of Tonkin, "called out bandits (MIGs) at our 060° position and proceeded to vector us on an intercept," recalled Lodge. During the air battle, they shot down a MiG-21.

== Operation Linebacker ==
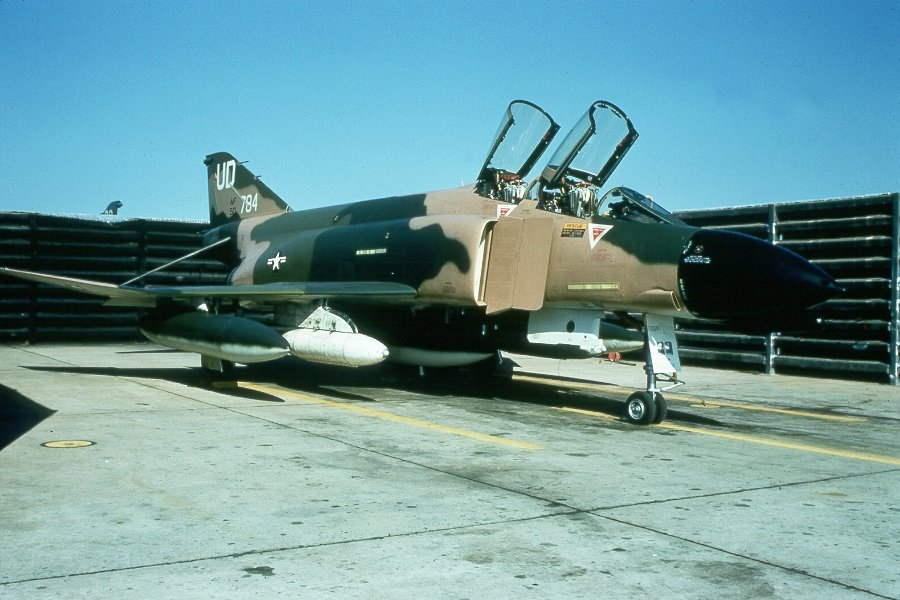
555th TFS F-4D Phantom II 65–0784, the aircraft flown by Locher the day he was shot down.

On May 8, 1972, Lodge and Locher responded to a request for assistance from Red Crown for fighters who were engaging MiGs near Yên Bái. Their element leader was Captain Stephen Ritchie and his WSO, Captain Charles B. DeBellevue.

We were about Mach 1.4, with the MIG about as fast as us in afterburner. I was low on the MIG, and I do not believe he was aware he was under attack. He was in a right turn, initially, then reversed to the left. I fired two AIM-7 missiles in ripple fire (Note: "Ripple fire" means to have more than one missile in the air at one time. This was to increase the probability of a kill and was especially important given the low success rate of Vietnam era missiles. For instance, in the same engagement that led to Major Handley's supersonic gun kill, Handley ripple fired two salvos of two missiles each, his entire complement. Of the first pair of radar guided Sparrows one of which dropped off the rail without its motor engaging and the other was a "moon shot" (the missile completely missed its target by flying upwards). Of the second pair of infra-red guided Falcons, one was a moon shot and the other failed to leave the rail.) at a distance of 4,500 feet, using a pure pursuit attack at about 20 degrees angle-off. Both missiles guided directly to the target. The first hit the MIG's right wing, which was breaking up when the second missile hit the center of the fuselage.

They scored their second MiG kill, placing them in the lead of all USAF crews then flying in Southeast Asia.

On May 10, 1972, the first major day of air combat in Operation Linebacker, Locher's group was one of two flights of the F-4D MiGCap for the morning strike force. Oyster Flight, composed of four F-4s from the 555th Tactical Fighter Squadron, had three of its Phantoms equipped with the top secret Combat Tree Identification friend or foe (IFF) interrogators. The APX-80 electronic set could read the IFF signals of the transponders built into the MiGs so that North Vietnamese radar would not shoot down their own aircraft. Displayed on a scope in the WSO's cockpit, Combat Tree gave the Phantoms the ability to identify and locate MiGs when they were still beyond visual range. At 09:23, Oyster Flight was warned by EC-121 Disco over Laos, and then by the US Navy radar picket ship, the guided missile cruiser USS Chicago, call sign Red Crown, of four MiGs headed towards them. These were from the 921st Fighter Regiment. Four J-6s were also flying combat air patrol to protect the Thac Ba hydroelectric power station. The Americans engaged an equal number of MiG-21s head-on, scattering them. Lodge and Locher identified two hostile contacts 50 miles (80 km) south of Yên Bái. They attacked in a modified fluid-four formation and accelerated to 1.4 mach. At 9:48 they fired two AIM-7s and the second destroyed one of the MiGs.

Oyster Flight shot down two more MiGs. The second MiG-21 was downed by Lodge's wingman, 1st Lt John D. Markle, and his WSO, Captain Stephen D. Eaves. A few minutes later Ritchie and DeBellevue shot down a third MiG. Lodge and Locher nearly got the fourth MiG-21, but fell victim to a MiG tactic dubbed "Kuban tactics" after those of the Soviet World War II ace Alexander Pokryshkin, in which a ground-controlled flight of four Shenyang J-6s were launched after the MiG-21s so that they could be steered behind the American fighters maneuvering to attack the MiG-21s. Pilot Nguyen Manh Tung of No. 2 Flight came up from below in his J-6 and hit Lodge and Locher's F-4D, Serial Number 65-0784, with his three large, 30 mm cannons as they were lining up a second shot on another MiG-21. Markle and Eaves were behind the J-6s but were unable to lock on to them before Lodge and Locher were hit.

== Ejection and evasion ==
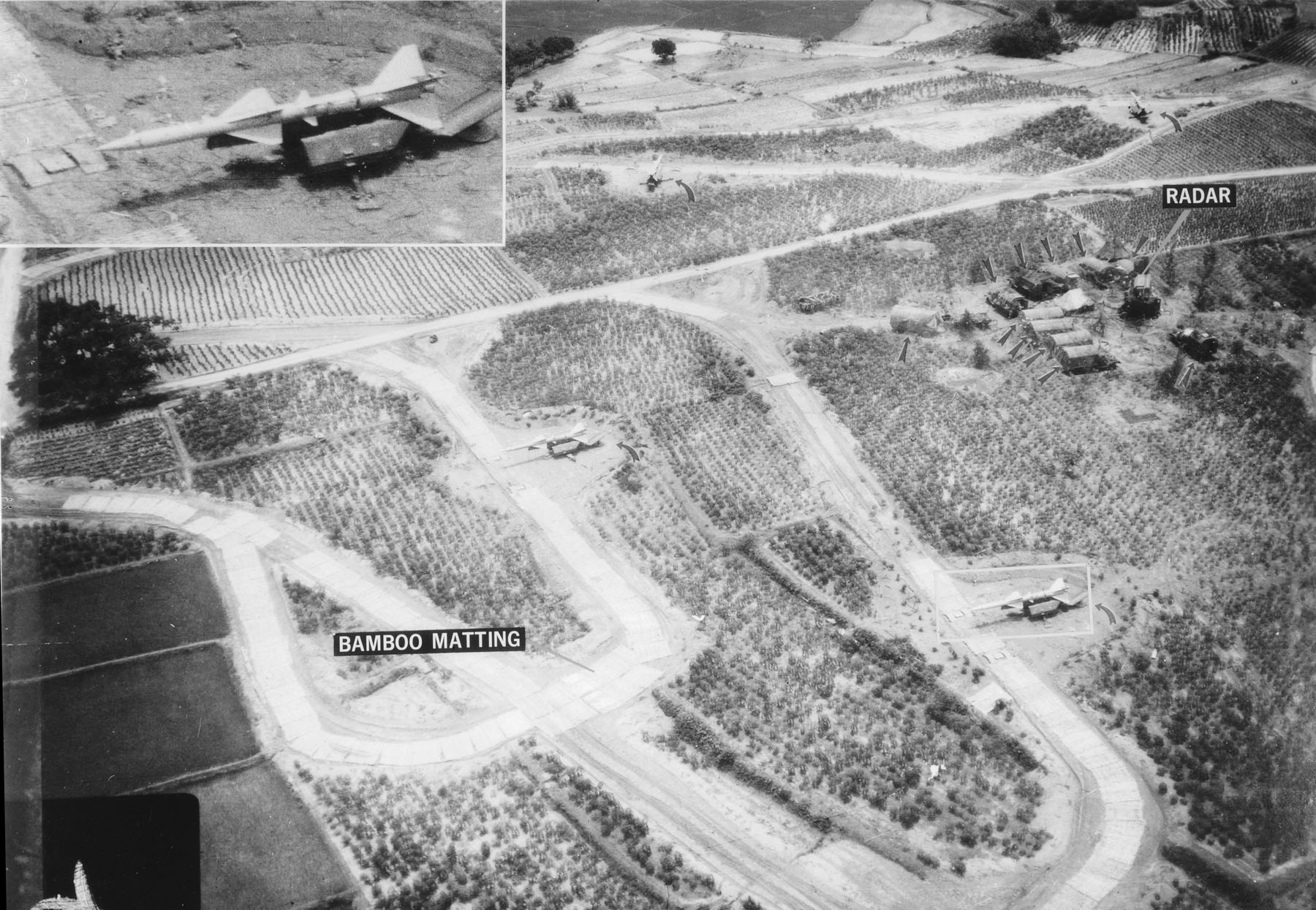
S-75 missile battery in North Vietnam during 1965

Locher reported later that the aircraft went into a kind of right slice. He noted that the right engine's RPM was at zero and the left was decreasing towards idle. It looked to him that the right engine had exploded. Lodge and Locher discussed their options. They saw that the hydraulic pressure was low and falling. When Lodge tried the autopilot, it didn't respond. The rear of the jet was on fire, and as the plane yawed the slipstream pushed the flames up over Locher's canopy. Locher later recalled, "We immediately went out of control, flopping from side to side. Then fire started coming in the back of the cockpit. It seared my canopy with bubbles and I couldn't see out any more. The airplane slowed down and was approaching a flat spin." Passing through 8000 MSL, Locher told Lodge that it was getting too hot and he'd better get out. Lodge looked over his right shoulder at Locher and said, "Well, why don't you eject then?"

Lodge had, about three weeks earlier, told fellow squadron members, as he had done several times before, that he would not allow himself to be captured because of his extensive knowledge of classified and sensitive information. Locher successfully ejected at about 8,000 feet (2,400 m) but because the remaining planes were busy with the other MiGs, and due to smoke, no one saw his parachute canopy. Two J-6s (quite likely the ones that had just shot them down) buzzed Locher as he descended, so he knew the enemy was aware he had survived. He estimated it took about 30 seconds for the jet to impact the ground, but never saw Lodge's chute.

Locher was afraid to use his URC-64 rescue radio as he parachuted because it was difficult to remove from the zippered pocket of his survival vest and he was not sure he could get it back in. He figured out his rough location and managed to steer his chute about 2,000 yards (1,800 m) away from the plane burning below him and towards a nearby mountain side. After he landed, he couldn't hide his parachute because it was stuck in the trees overhead.

He removed a couple of essential items from his survival pack and left the remainder behind. His survival vest contained a pistol, two pints of water, a first aid kit, insect repellent, mosquito netting and a knife. He knew from prior briefings that he could not expect combat search and rescue (SAR) this deep in North Vietnam, north of the Red River. Once on the ground and under the trees, he could not hear any jet overhead. He also knew his radio could not penetrate the dense jungle canopy.

Locher listened to hear if a search party was looking for him. He camouflaged his trail for about 100 yards (91 m) and then climbed the eastern side of the mountain to its peak. He got his bearings and then hid in bushes on the west slope. For three days, Locher listened as a search party of local farmers beat the bushes up and down the east side of the mountain, searching for him. He hid in a brush pile and at one point over the next three days, a boy came within 30 feet (9.1 m) of his hiding place. In the evening he returned to the peak. On the second day he picked up radio traffic from American aircraft almost 100 miles (160 km) to his south, but they did not hear his radio beeper or voice.

He decided his best chance for rescue was to cross the forested, hilly terrain and get to the heavily cultivated Red River Valley, swim the river and work his way to the sparsely inhabited mountains to the south. He figured it would take him 45 days. He traveled only at first light and at dusk, avoiding the local farmers and living off the land.

He was able to find plenty of water but only occasionally fruit and berries to eat. He evaded capture and covered over 19 km (12 mi), gradually losing 30 pounds (14 kg) and his strength. On the 10th day he came within 5 feet (1.5 m) of being discovered. Following a well-used trail early one morning, he suddenly had to evade local farmers. He hid in a nearby field where there was little concealment, but pulled leaves and debris over himself. He lay there all day as children from a village he discovered a short distance away played in his vicinity. At one point a water buffalo nearly stepped on him, and a boy came to fetch the animal, only a few feet from Locher. That evening he spotted a hill near the village alongside the Red River, the last hill before the wide open fields of the Red River basin. He was about 5 miles (8.0 km) from Yên Bái Airfield.

He hid on the hill for the next 13 days and watched for American aircraft. On June 1, 1972, he was finally able to contact a flight of American jets overhead, calling, "Any U.S. aircraft, if you read Oyster 1 Bravo, come up on Guard". Ritchie, in one of the F-4 aircraft overhead and who had witnessed Locher's jet fall out of the sky, remembered Locher's call sign and answered his call. Locher calmly responded, "Guys I've been down here a long time, any chance of picking me up?" Ritchie replied, "You bet!" Locher's transmissions left some Americans who did not hear his call in doubt about the authenticity of his message, and they believed that the People's Army of Vietnam may have manipulated a POW into impersonating him, setting a trap for the would-be rescuers.

== Search and rescue ==
A SAR mission of several A-1H Skyraider attack aircraft and two HH-53C Super Jolly Green Giant helicopters with F-4 and F-105 fighters providing air protection was launched that same day (June 1), but was driven off by heavy anti-aircraft fire and MiGs. The A-1H and HH-53C pilots came under attack from a MiG but eluded the enemy fighter in a narrow canyon. The rescue force then dodged missiles, another MiG and gunfire, but failed to get through to Locher that day.

On June 2, 1972, General John Vogt, commander of the 7th Air Force, consulted with Army MACV commander General Frederick C. Weyand. Vogt canceled the entire strike mission set for Hanoi that day. He dedicated all the available resources, over 150 aircraft, to rescuing Locher. The direct task force of 119 aircraft included two HH-53C rescue helicopters, bombers and an array of F-4 escorts, EB-66s, A-1Hs, F-105G Wild Weasels, and KC-135 tankers. Vogt said,

I had to decide whether we should risk the loss of maybe a dozen airplanes and crews just to get one man out. Finally I said to myself, Goddamn it, the one thing that keeps our boys motivated is the certain belief that if they go down, we will do absolutely everything we can to get them out. If that is ever in doubt, morale would tumble. That was my major consideration. So I took it on myself. I didn't ask anybody for permission. I just said, "Go do it!"

The Yên Bái air base, about 60 miles (97 km) northwest of Hanoi, was one of the most important and well-defended airbases in North Vietnam. The aircraft bombed and strafed around Yên Bái air base for two hours, reducing enemy opposition so that the helicopters could get in. Fortunately for the Americans, during the second half of May 1972 their increasingly fierce attacks on Yen Bai had forced elements of the VPAF 925th Fighter Regiment to relocate to Gia Lam Airfield. Captain Ronald E. Smith and his wingman, Capt. Ross "Buck" Buchanan, in A-1Hs, went in ahead to locate Locher. Antiaircraft fire aimed at the A-1Hs, seen by both the pilots and Locher, served as a reference point to locate Locher, and the A-1Hs returned to guide in the rescue helicopters. Smith told Locher to flash the first A-1 he saw with his signal mirror. Upon their return, Buck saw Locher's mirror flash, told Locher to "pop" his "smoke", and guided Captain Dale Stovall, piloting an HH-53C from the 40th Aerospace Rescue and Recovery Squadron, to Locher's position. Locher's flare went unseen, and Stovall overflew his position and had to double back. Spotting the flash from Locher's signal mirror, Stovall hovered over the steep slope, rotors dangerously close to the trees, and lowered a jungle penetrator under enemy fire. Only when Locher rose out of the jungle canopy riding the jungle penetrator were all of the Americans sure it was him. Despite their proximity to Yen Bai air base, no aircraft were lost during Locher's rescue. "We shut down the war to go get Roger Locher," Stovall later said.

Locher was flown back to Udorn. The first person to greet him was Vogt, who had flown up from Saigon in a T-39. Locher had successfully evaded capture for 23 days, a record for the war. The evening of his return, he was greeted at the Officers Club by hundreds of individuals with an ovation lasting 20 minutes. During the rescue, an F-4E piloted by Major Phil Handley and his RIO Jack Smallwood shot down a MiG-19 using his gun while flying at over 900 mph in what is the only confirmed supersonic gun kill in history.

== Recognition ==
Stovall had twice flown his HH-53C further into North Vietnam than had ever been done before. For their efforts in rescuing Locher, both Smith and Stovall were awarded the Air Force Cross. Stovall's citation described how, "...he willingly returned to this high threat area, braving intense ground fire, to recover the downed airman from deep in North Vietnam." Stovall was also recognized with the 1973 Jabara Award for Airmanship.

== Post war ==
After his return to the United States, he attended undergraduate pilot training and was eventually assigned to fly the Phantom again—this time in the front seat. He flew the F-4 in New Mexico, Alaska and Florida before transitioning to the F-16 and serving in instructor and flight commander positions. He later played a key role in the early days of the super-secret "black program" that produced the Lockheed F-117 Nighthawk stealth fighter.

Retiring from the U.S. Air Force in the rank of colonel in 1998, Locher retired in Sabetha, Kansas, where he resided as of February, 2025.

== In popular culture ==
The TV series Dogfights on the History Channel depicted the dogfight of May 10, 1972 in Season 2, Episode 10, The Bloodiest Day shown on December 3, 2007. His rescue was once again referenced in the episode Supersonic.
