= Yên Bái Air Base =

Airport in Vietnam

- Part of Vietnam People's Air Force

Site information
- Type: Air Force Base
- Controlled by: Vietnam People's Air Force

Location
- Coordinates: 21°43′58.8″N 104°51′14.4″E

Site history
- Built: 1960s
- In use: 1967-Present
- Battles/wars: Vietnam War

Airfield information
- IATA: none; ICAO: VVYB

Summary
- Interactive map of Airfield information

Runways
Direction	Length		Surface
Direction	ft	m	Surface
13/31	9,170	2,795	Concrete

Yên Bái Air Base is a Vietnam People's Air Force (VPAF) (Không quân Nhân dân Việt Nam) military airfield located southeast of Lào Cai province.

== History ==
=== Vietnam War ===
On 15 November 1967 F-105s of the 357th Tactical Fighter Squadron bombed the base as part of a Commando Club guided bombing mission.

In February 1969 the 925th Fighter Regiment was formed at the base operating the MiG-17F and Shenyang J-6.

On 10 May 1972 a VPAF J-6 of the 925th Fighter Regiment ran out of fuel after a combat air patrol mission, deadsticked from an altitude of 1,400 meters, descending too rapidly, and overran the runway overturning and exploding, killing the pilot instantly.

On 1 June 1972 F-4D #65-0784 was shot down by a VPAF J-6 near the base, the weapons system operator Capt Roger Locher successfully evaded capture for 23 days before being rescued.

On 27 September 1972 USAF jets attacked the base, destroying one MiG-21 on the ground and damaging another.

On 30 September 1972 U.S. jets attacked the base destroying two MiG-17s on the ground.

In late 1972 USAF F-111 Aardvark strike bombers attacked the base, rendering it temporarily inoperable, the only time Yên Bái was inoperable during Operation Linebacker II.

=== Current use ===
The VPAF 921st Fighter Squadron operating Su-22M4/UM3K is based at the airbase.
