= 478th =

478th may refer to:

- 478th Aeronautical Systems Wing (478 ASW), wing of the United States Air Force based out of Wright-Patterson Air Force Base, Ohio
- 478th Bombardment Squadron, inactive United States Air Force unit
- 478th Tactical Fighter Squadron, inactive United States Air Force unit

== See also ==
- 478 (number)
- 478, the year 478 (CDLXXVIII) of the Julian calendar
- 478 BC
