= Operation Phou Phiang III =

Laotian Civial War offensive

- Part of Laotian Civil War; Vietnam War
| Date | 18 January – March 1973 |
| Location | Plain of Jars, Laos |
| Result | Royalist forces fail to dislodge North Vietnamese troops; ceasefire ends the war |
| Territorial changes | Status quo maintained |

Belligerents
| Kingdom of Laos; Supported by United States | North Vietnam |

Units involved
| (Kingdom of Laos) Mobile Group 22; Mobile Group 26; Mobile Group 23; Mobile Group 28; Commando Battalion 616A; Commando Battalion 623 (United States) Five Boeing CH-47 Chinooks; Air America transport | |

Operation Phou Phiang III (18 January – March 1973) was the final offensive of the Laotian Civil War by the Royal Lao Army's L'Armée Clandestine. Central Intelligence Agency-sponsored Hmong guerrillas and Thai mercenaries formed three attacking task forces in an attempt to clear the People's Army of Vietnam from positions near the Royalist guerrillas' headquarters on the Plain of Jars. All three columns failed to move the Vietnamese invaders before the ceasefire of 21 February 1973 ended the war.

== Overview ==
A Communist insurrection began in the Kingdom of Laos immediately after independence. Moving into the vacuum left by the departing French, the United States began providing military and financial support to the Royal Lao Government. From 1961 until the war's end in February 1973, the Central Intelligence Agency (CIA), the CIA-raised guerrillas of L'Armée Clandestine would resist the invading People's Army of Vietnam.

== Background ==
Operation Phou Phiang II had ended with the People's Army of Vietnam (PAVN) within striking distance of the Royalist guerrilla headquarters at Long Tieng on the Plain of Jars. With peace negotiations in progress, any ceasefire would fix the contending forces in place. As if that were not worrisome enough to the Royal Lao Government, on 12 December, infiltrating PAVN troops again struck the vital guerrilla base at Long Tieng. U.S. Air Force AC-130 Spectre gunships, F-4 Phantom IIs, and A-7 Corsairs struck targets of opportunity in the Communist advance. The Royal Lao Air Force (RLAF) T-28 Trojans flew about twice as many missions as the American air forces, but with a smaller ordnance load. When the flying weather turned bad, air operations reverted to the Sentinel Lock radar beacon bombing system by B-52 Stratofortresses and F-111 Aardvarks of the 474th Tactical Fighter Wing (based in Thailand) that had been pioneered in Operation Phou Phiang II.

After a week of suffering casualties from air strikes, the PAVN forces withdrew, taking a route past the northern outpost at Bouamlong as they did so. With the Vietnamese building a road as a supply route towards the Royalist position for a final assault, and artillery fire raining in on the Royalists, PAVN anti-aircraft gunners steadily fired upon the air bridge needed to supply the greatly outnumbered monarchist garrison. A follow-up operation, Phou Phiang III, was designed to relieve Bouamlong, as well as reduce the threat to Long Tieng.

Bouamlong was steadily raked by incoming 122mm and 130mm shells. As the result of a 17 December conference on the matter, an intelligence data base was developed of locations of past usage of Communist 122mm and 130mm field guns. Raven Forward Air Controllers and photo reconnaissance pilots surveilled the old gun locations. As the Communists reused their past locations, their guns were spotted and struck with laser guided bombs. By the turn of the year, seven of the big guns had been hit. U.S. air power totaled 957 sorties for December; the RLAF flew 2,200.

== Activities ==
The operational plan called for three task forces—Alpha, Bravo, and Charlie—to attack the Communists during the middle of January 1973. On 15 January, U.S. bombing of North Vietnam was halted, diverting additional air power to Laos.

=== Task Force Bravo ===
On 18 January 1973, the task force left the village of Ban Na in the hills and headed eastward towards the Jungle's Mouth. Consisting of the Groupmente Mobile 22 (GM 22) guerrilla regiment, along with reinforcements from Groupement Mobile 26 (GM 26), it moved to within six kilometers of its objective and stalled.

=== Task Force Charlie ===
Task Force Charlie contained two Hmong guerrilla regiments, Groupmente Mobile 23 (GM 23) and Groupmente Mobile 28 (GM 28). Their starting point for their offensive was Ban Pa Dong. They ranged within seven kilometers of its objective, Xiengkhouangville, before they held up.

=== Task Force Alpha ===
The operational plan for Task Force Alpha called for both a southern and a northern pincer. A Commando Raiders team was helicoptered in to secure a landing zone eight kilometers southeast of the Moung Soui airfield. Two Thai mercenary battalions—Bataillon Commando 616A (BC 616A) and Bataillon Commando 623 (BC 623)—were then lifted in by Air America to form the southern pincer.

Early on 3 February, 31 Commando Raiders were infiltrated eight kilometers northeast of the old fighter base at Moung Soui. They were followed in by another Thai "volunteer" battalion, Bataillon Commando 617A (BC 617A). The next day, Bataillon Commando 624 (BC 624) joined the task force.

The operational plan called for the four battalions to link up in a recaptured Moung Soui. The southern pincer was forced to move through a swamp, which slowed it down. The northern pincer also failed to move far from their line of departure. On the day they were schedules to meet, the two columns were still distant from one another. A strategy conference was held at the royalist headquarters in Long Tieng. While it was in session, the northern half of the task force came under 130mm field gun fire. Having only 81mm mortars for reply, and lacking bunkers for cover, the Thais moved north out of range, further opening the pincers and giving PAVN maneuver room.

Five Air America Boeing CH-47 Chinooks were sent to rescue the northern contingent. Frantic Thai soldiers crowded aboard, as BC 624 was evacuated to a location southeast of Phou Phasai, and BC 617A was shifted to join the southern pincer by 14 February. However, even beefed up to three battalions, the southern column was also unsuccessful in its offensive.

== Result ==
The ceasefire ending the Laotian Civil War came into effect on 21 February 1973. The southern contingent of Task Force Alpha was withdrawn in March to end the operation.

== Aftermath ==
On 21 February 1973, the Royalists and the Pathet Lao agreed to a ceasefire, effective at noon on the 22nd. As an internal agreement between Laotians, it was subject to no international supervision or enforcement. Once spared constant air strikes, Communist columns claimed additional territory. Air strikes were now discontinued, except for sporadic retribution for Communist violations. In turn, the Communists claimed retaliatory strikes were truce violations. In any event, the American air units were returning to the United States.

On 5 April 1974, the Provisional Government of National Union was formed. On 27 March 1975, the Communists attacked the Hmong guerrillas and families still on the Plain of Jars, sparking the Hmong diaspora. The Communists took power on 2 December 1975, when they established the Lao People's Democratic Republic.
