= 474th Tactical Fighter Wing =

Inactive United States Air Force unit

474th Tactical Fighter Wing

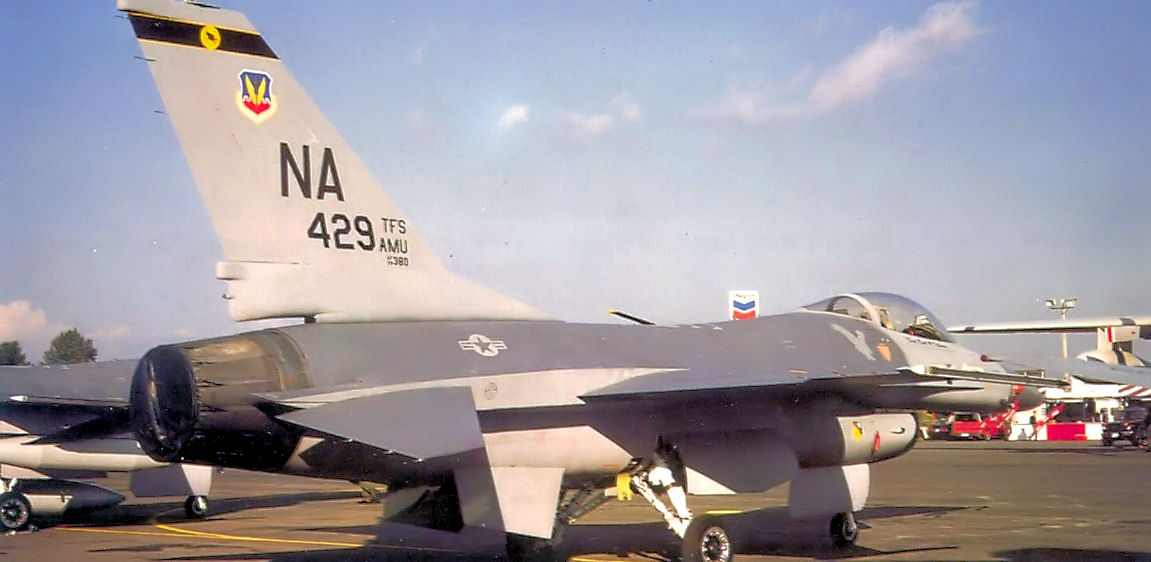
- 429th Tactical Fighter Squadron F-16 at Nellis AFB (Note: Aircraft is General Dynamics F-16A Block 10A serial 79–380)
- Active: 1952–1954; 1957–1989
- Country: United States
- Branch: United States Air Force
- Role: Fighter, Attack, Interdiction
- Nickname: F-111A Roadrunners
- Engagements: Korean War; Vietnam War
- Decorations: Air Force Outstanding Unit Award with Combat "V" Device; Air Force Outstanding Unit Award; Republic of Korea Presidential Unit Citation; Vietnamese Gallantry Cross with Palm

Insignia
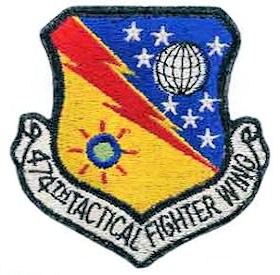
- Patch with 474th Tactical Fighter Wing emblem (approved 14 November 1958)

- Unofficial 474th TFW F-111 Road Runners Patch

The 474th Tactical Fighter Wing is an inactive United States Air Force unit. Its last assignment was at Nellis Air Force Base (IATA code LSV), Nevada, where it trained combat-ready aircrews and maintained a rapid-reaction capability to execute fighter attacks against enemy forces and facilities world-wide in time of crisis. A World War II predecessor unit, the 474th Fighter Group (see 474th Air Expeditionary Group), was a Ninth Air Force combat unit of the Army Air Corps which fought in the European Theater. During its operational lifetime, the 474th Fighter Bomber Wing was engaged in combat operations during the Korean War and the 474th Tactical Fighter Wing was engaged in combat operations during the Vietnam War. Throughout its history, the 474th Wing flew the North American F-86 Sabre, Republic F-84 Thunderjet, F-100D, F-111A, F-4D, and F-16A/B. The 474th Tactical Fighter Wing was inactivated on 30 September 1989.

== History ==
=== Korean War F-84E/G Operations ===
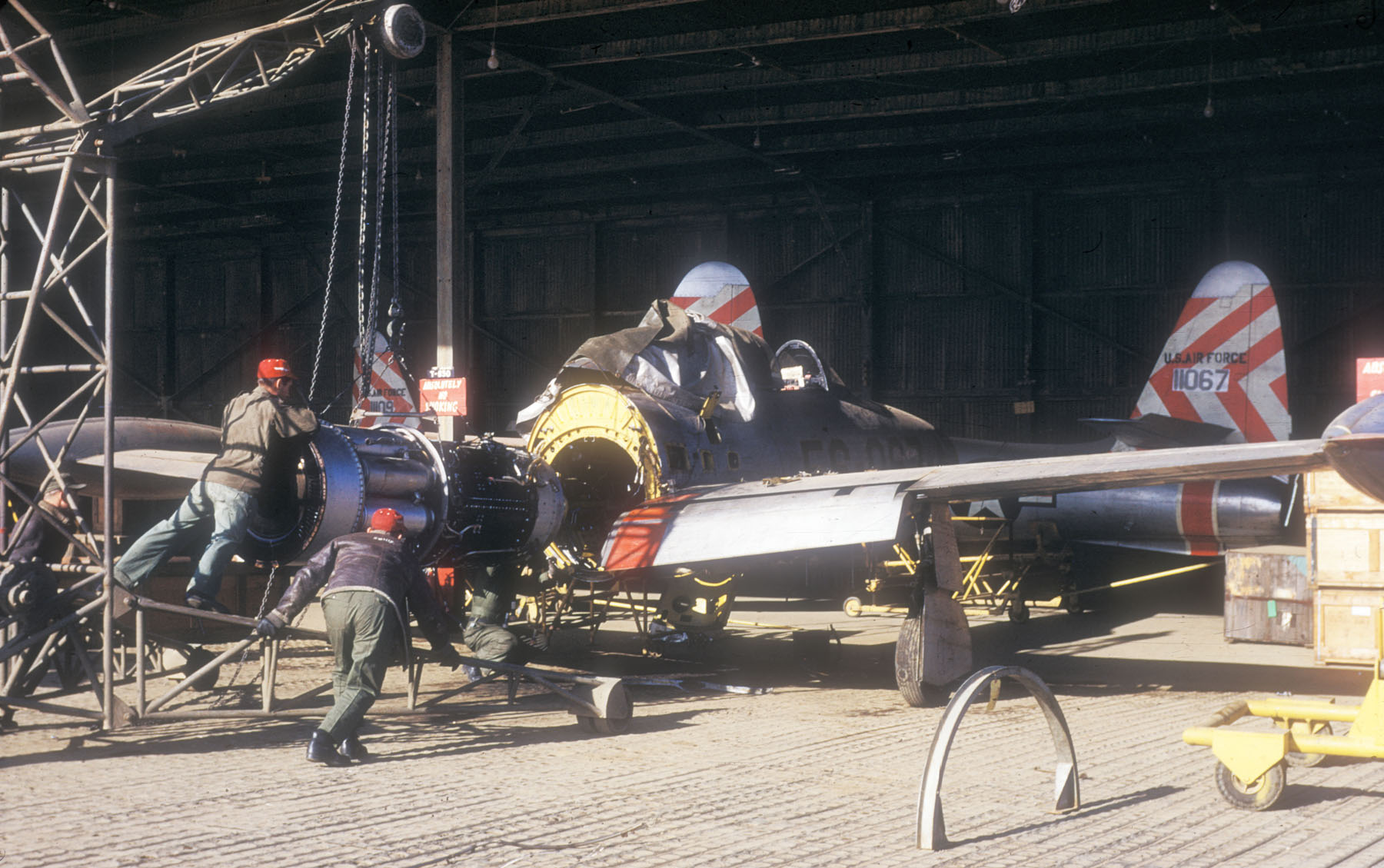
Maintenance on a 430th FBS F-84E at Taegu Air Base, 1954.

The 474th Fighter Bomber Wing (474th FBW) was established on 25 June 1952 assigned to Tactical Air Command (TAC). On 10 July 1952, the wing was activated at Misawa Air Base (IATA code MSJ), Japan, taking over the personnel and F-84G Thunderjets of the 116th Fighter-Bomber Wing. The number "474th" designation recalled the World War II history of the 474th Fighter Group which included the 428th, 429th, and 430th Fighter Squadrons. Corresponding to this legacy, the 474th Fighter Bomber Wing included, as a component, the 474th Fighter-Bomber Group which included the 428th Fighter-Bomber Squadron, 429th Fighter-Bomber Squadron, and 430th Fighter-Bomber Squadron as combat components. It was assigned to TAC, but attached to 5th Air Force until 1 April 1953 for duty in the Korean War. On 10 July 1952, in what was one of the largest air deployments of its kind, the 474th Wing moved to Kunsan Air Base (IATA code KUV), Korea on the western side of the Korean peninsula, while the 474th Maintenance Squadron moved to Itazuke Air Base (IATA code FUK), Japan and integrated into the rear-echelon maintenance combined operations for Thunderjet fighters. Other support units remained at Misawa, attached to the Japan Air Defense Force while the tactical components at Kunsan included the 474th Fighter-Bomber Group.

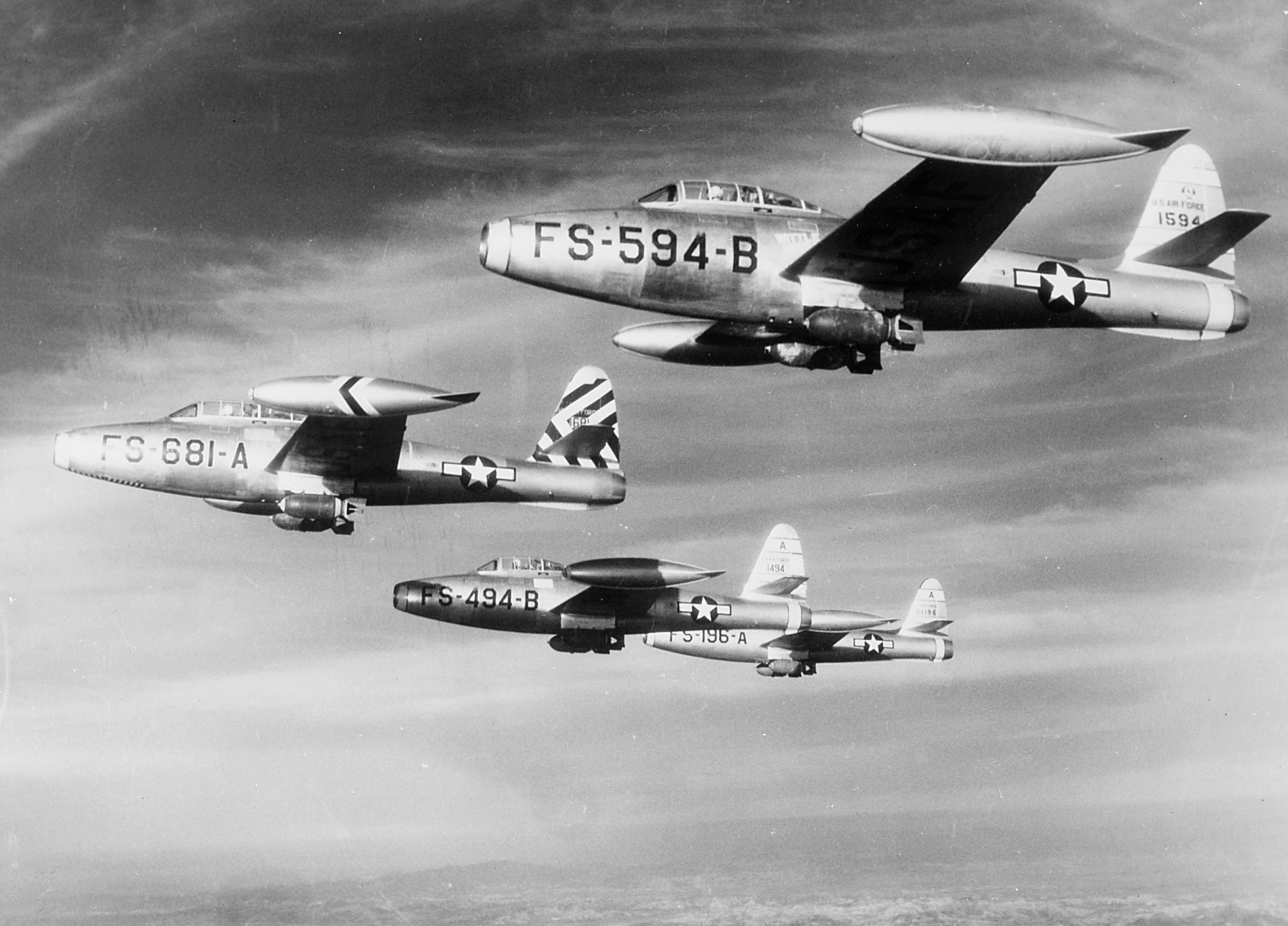
474th F-84G 4-Ship With 430th plane in lead

The 474th Fighter-Bomber Group (474th FBG), as a component of the 474th Fighter-Bomber Wing, initiated combat operations in the Korean War on 1 August 1952. Fighter-bomber operations included night interdiction missions and targeted supply, transportation, and troop concentrations. Specific accomplishments included devastating strikes against troop concentrations near Pyongyang, disruption of a MiG attack, and major strikes against a munitions factory and destruction of a political/military instruction center. Missions included night interdiction missions against supplies and lines of communications, escorting Douglas B-26 Invaders on bombing operations in MiG Alley; air defense suppression; armed reconnaissance; and strafing and bombing troops in trenches, bunkers, and shelters, and heavy weapons positions. In January 1953 targeting shifted to communications, training complexes, and rebuilt North Korean assets, including: the Sinanju rail facilities, the Kyomipo industrial area, the Pyongyang Tank and Infantry School, the munitions processing plant near Sunchon, and enemy troop concentrations near Wonsan.

On 1 April 1953, the 474th Fighter-Bomber Wing was attached to the 58th Fighter-Bomber Wing. As part of the move, the 474th Fighter Bomber Group was detached from the 474th FBW and assumed the personnel and equipment of the 49th Fighter-Bomber Group at Taegu. It was attached to the 58th Fighter-Bomber Wing as a reinforced wing, and the 474th Fighter Bomber Wing was reduced to paper status. The 474th FBW was subsequently inactivated on 8 November 1954. This made the 58th the largest fighter-bomber wing in Korea. Only the 430th Squadron actually moved to Taegu. With the coming of spring the 474th FBG contributed significantly to Operation Spring Thaw, a Fifth Air Force program to disrupt communist efforts to move supplies to the front in bad weather. The 474th FBG knocked out supply lines and inhibited their repair. During peak efforts, the 474th FBG pilots often flew four or five missions per day. The 474th Fighter Bomber Group participated in a total of 2207 close support strike. The 474th FBG participated in the destruction of North Korean airfields to prevent a last minute influx of enemy planes and material. "On 22 July 1953, in one mission led by Lt. Col. Douglas Montgomery, who was then executive officer of the 474th FBG, 30 out of a total of 40 bombs were placed along the entire length of a runway at the airfield at Sunchon." On the 27 July, just prior to the signing of the truce, the 474th attacked Chunggangjin Airfield in what was one of the last and one of the deepest penetrations of the War. When hostilities stopped, the Armed Forces Assistance to Korea program was launched and the men of the 474th FBG volunteered their off-duty time to work with local villagers in constructing and replenishing a new school building.

==== Korean War Era Campaigns ====
- Korea Summer-Fall, 1952
- Third Korean Winter
- Korea Summer-Fall, 1953

=== Cold War F-86H and F-100D Operations ===
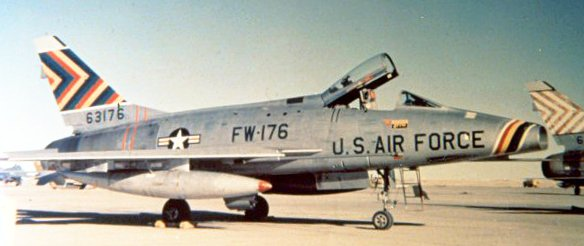
474th F-100D at Cannon AFB

The 474th Fighter Bomber Wing was activated at Cannon Air Force Base (IATA code CVS) on 8 October 1957, replacing the 474th Fighter Bomber Group and including the 428th, 429th, 430th and 478th Fighter Bomber Squadrons. It was redesignated the 474th Tactical Fighter Wing (TFW) on 1 July 1958 with the associated squadrons being designated tactical fighter squadrons. It maintained proficiency in tactical fighter operations, deploying components, aircraft, and crews on a global basis in support of NATO, Pacific Air Forces, Alaskan Air Command, and other organizations while flying the North American F-100D Super Sabre. The 474th TFW deployed three squadrons (44 aircraft) to Homestead Air Force Base (IATA code HST) Florida during the Cuban Missile Crisis on 24 October 1962 as part of the Air Division, Provisional, 1st under Brigadier General Gordon M. Graham. The entire wing, except for a deployed squadron in Southeast Asia, reverted to paper status on 15 September 1965, and the detached squadron was reduced to paper status upon its return to the United States. The 429th Tactical Fighter Squadron had been deployed with the F-100D to Bien Hoa Air Base (IATA code VBH), South Vietnam with the 3rd Tactical Fighter Wing on 13 July 1965. The Squadron flew 1627 missions before its return to the U.S. It returned to the U.S. to be inactivated on 16 December 1965.

=== F-111A Operations ===
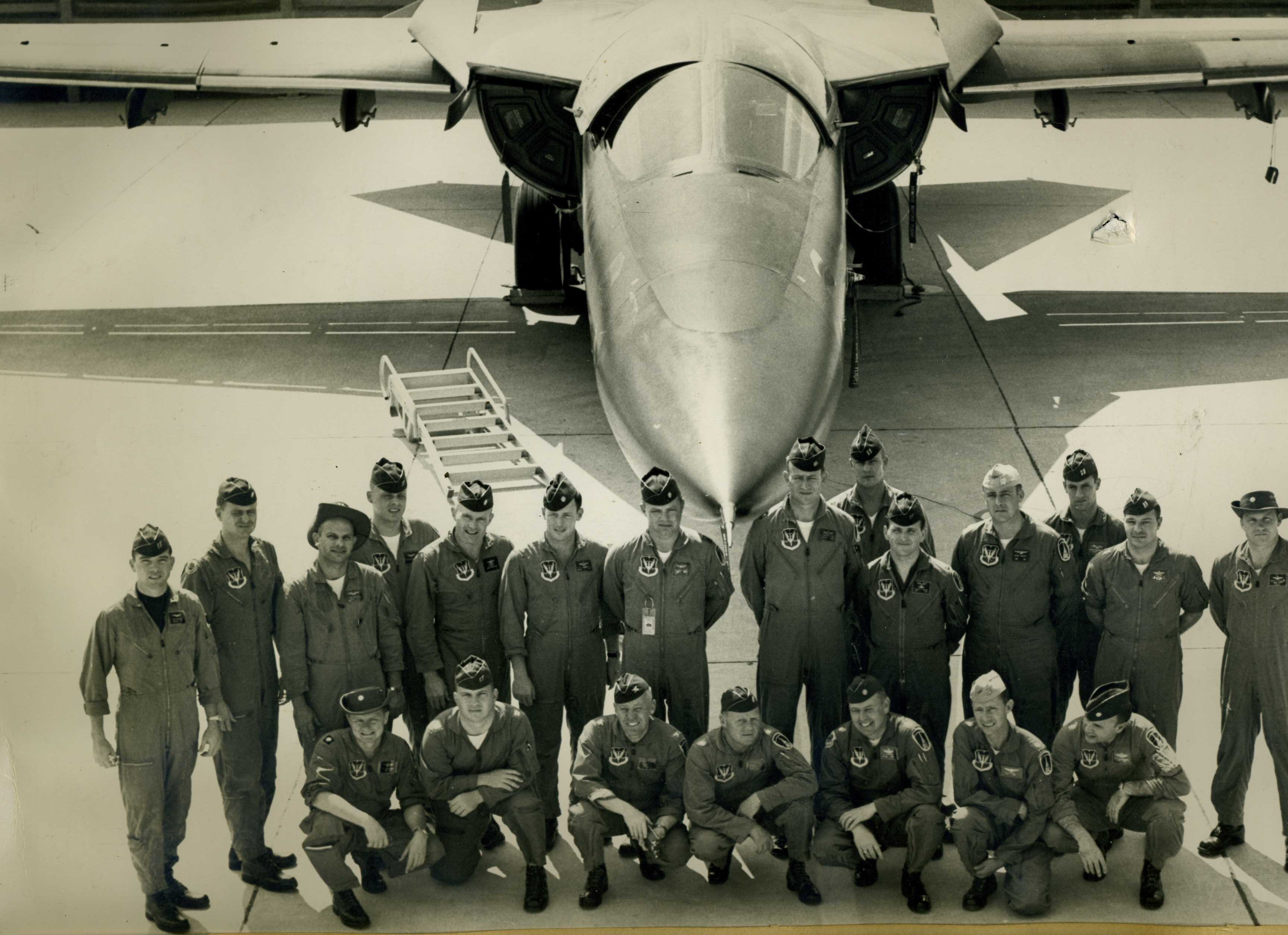
Combat Lancer 428TFS Det.1 Flightcrews Takhli RTAFB March '68

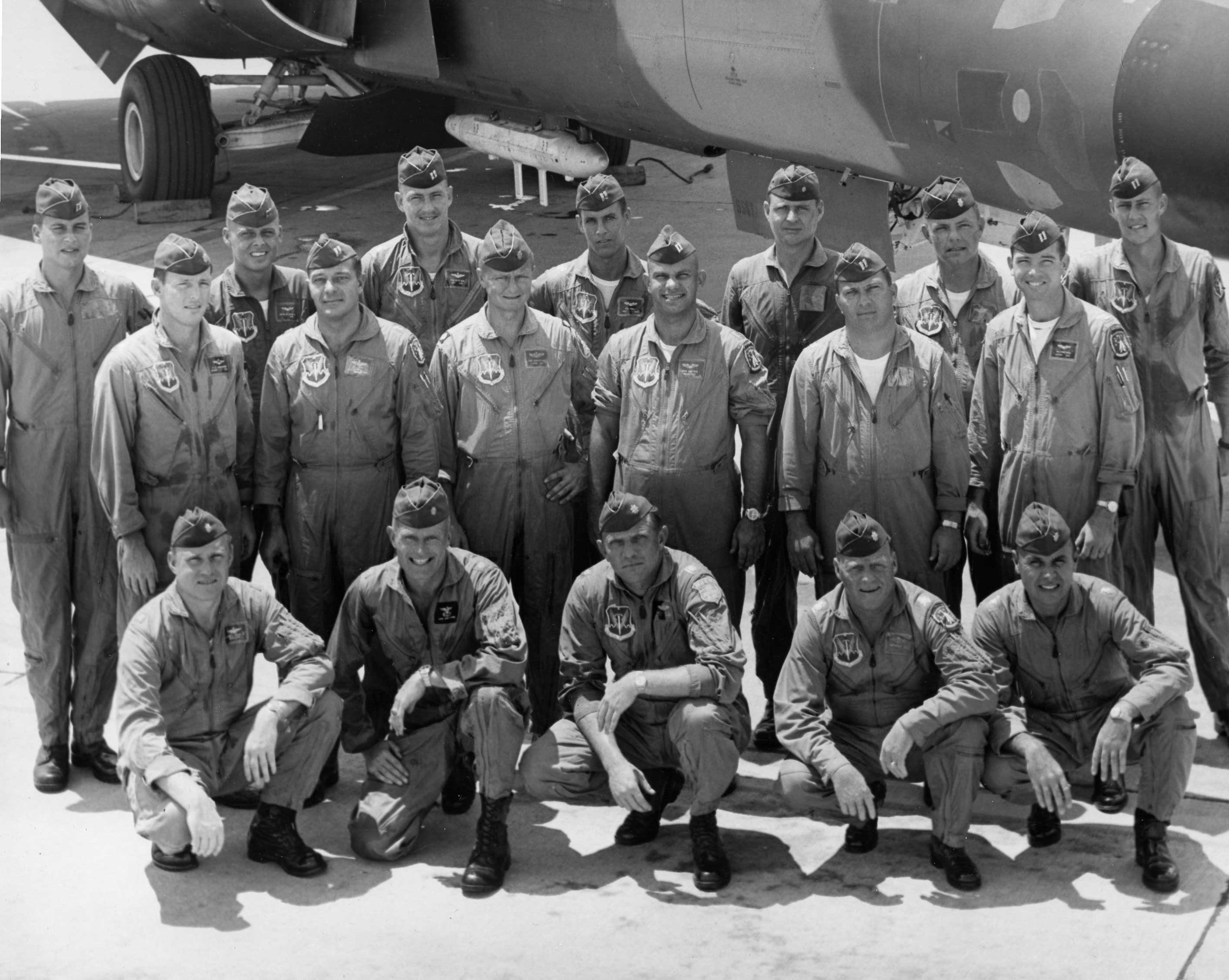
Combat Lancer 428TFS Det.2 Flightcrews Takhli RTAFB Nov '68

The 474th (Roadrunners) became the first USAF operational wing equipped with the General Dynamics F-111. In anticipation of the activation of the 474th at Nellis, personnel and equipment were initially deployed from Cannon AFB to Nellis AFB throughout 1967. On 20 January 1968 the 474th Tactical Fighter Wing was activated at Nellis Air Force Base, Nevada replacing MAJCON 4480th Tactical Fighter Wing, which had been activated on 15 July 1967, giving the base an operational tactical fighter wing assigned to Twelfth Air Force. With the Wing, the 428th Tactical Fighter Squadron (Tail Code NA - blue stripe) replaced the 4481st Tactical Fighter Squadron (TFS) and the existing 429th Tactical Fighter Squadron (Tail Code NB - yellow stripe) was assigned to the 474th TFW.

In January 1968, the 428th Tactical Fighter Squadron Detachment 1 received the first 6 of 9 "Harvest Reaper" aircraft [66017, 66018, 66019, 66020, 66021, 66022]: F-111As with the unique camouflage paint job and upgraded avionics (including the ballistics computer unit and fittings for external noise jammers) in preparation for combat evaluation. With the move to Nellis, the 474th Combat Support Group became the base operating host unit. On 15 May 1968 the 429th TFS rejoined the 474th TFW, but without personnel and equipment. The 428th TFS reached an initial operational capability in the spring of 1968. In December 1968, Tactical Air Command activated the 4527th Combat Crew Training Squadron (Tail Code ND - green stripe) as a dedicated F-111 pilot training squadron at Nellis. The squadron performed lead-in training for experienced pilots in the F-111A. It was replaced in October 1969, transferring its personnel and equipment to the newly activated 442nd Tactical Fighter Training Squadron. On 15 September 1968 the 430th TFS (Tail Code NC - red stripe) again became part of the Wing.

==== Operation Rolling Thunder ====
On 8 February 1968 the Secretary of the Air Force recommended to the Air Force Chief of Staff that a full squadron of 24 F-111A aircraft be deployed to Southeast Asia. The Chief of Staff determined that the Harvest Reaper configuration of the aircraft was a pacing factor in the Combat Lancer deployment and only 9 aircraft were configured at that time. The Air Force decided to send a small detachment of 6 F-111As, including 22 flightcrew members and associated maintenance and support, to Southeast Asia under the Combat Lancer program using the six 428th TFS Harvest Reaper F-111As that were allocated to Combat Lancer as Detachment 1 under the command of Colonel (COL) Ivan H. Dethman. The Advance Team, under Lieutenant Colonel (LTC) Ed Palmgren (under the predecessor unit 4481st TFS), had been sent to Takhli Royal Thai Air Force Base (IATA code TKH) on 2 October 1967 to prepare for the deployment. Detachment 1 departed Nellis for Takhli RTAFB on 15 March 1968. The six F-111As, accompanied by Boeing KC-135 Stratotanker tankers, departed for Andersen Air Force Base (IATA code UAM), Guam. The other 10 crewmembers had been prepositioned to Takhli to receive the airplanes and crews on their arrival. The over 13 hour trip was flown using the F-111A's inertial navigation system and with topoff refueling from the tankers, arriving at Andersen on the 16th. The Detachment departed Andersen and arrived at Takhli on 17 March. The Detachment was attached to the Republic F-105 Thunderchief-flying 355th Tactical Fighter Wing in what was seen as the first stage in replacement of the 355th TFW's F-105s with the F-111A. The concept of operations was to employ the F-111A as an all-weather deep strike asset using low-level penetration tactics and without the need of the external support of aerial refueling tankers, defense suppression aircraft, and airborne electronic jammers. F-111A combat operations began on 25 March using the aircraft's unique terrain following radar capability to conduct surprise night deep air interdiction strikes. By the end of the deployment, 55 night low-level missions had been flown against targets in Route Pac 1 and 2 in North Vietnam using high-drag bombs, but three aircraft had been lost. Aircraft 66022, call sign Omaha 77 targeted against the Chan Hoa truck park in RP1, had been lost on 28 March with the loss of the crew, Major (MAJ) Hank MacCann and Captain (CPT) Dennis Graham. On 30 March, the crew of MAJ Sandy Marquardt and CPT Joe Hodges in aircraft 66017, Hotrod 76 targeted against the Ngoc Lam truck park in RP1, successfully ejected and was recovered uninjured in Thailand. Replacement aircraft had left Nellis, but a third loss halted F-111A combat operations. On 22 April, Tailbone 78 targeted against the Mi Le highway ferry in RP1, aircraft 66024 crewed by Lieutenant Commander Spade Cooley and by LTC Ed Palmgren, was lost. After the 3rd loss, the Detachment remained poised for combat, but they saw no combat action before their return to the U.S. on 22 November. Harvest Reaper F-111As 66016 and 66024 were deployed to Takhli RTAFB as replacements for two of the aircraft lost. Harvest Reaper aircraft 66023 remained stateside.

The causes of first and third losses continue to be unknown, but there was very little evidence the losses were due to enemy action. The wreckage of Omaha 77 was discovered in the Phu Phan Mountains in northern Thailand in 1989 and the crew's remains were recovered and returned to the U.S. The loss of Hotrod 73 on 30 March was not due to enemy action. An Accident Board was convened at Nakhon Phanom RTAFB (later moved to Takhli RTAFB) and a tube of fuel tank sealant was found at the accident site. The Board concluded that the accident was caused by the sealant tube being jammed in the pitch-roll mixer assembly. However, analysis of the tube was not conducted to determine if it contained fuel residue which would indicate it was in the logical location - in a fuel tank. Six weeks later, F-111A 66032 experienced a similar inflight failure and aircraft loss in the U.S. The cause was traced to a failure of a hydraulic control-valve rod for the horizontal tail servo actuator which caused the aircraft to pitch up uncontrollably. Further inspection of the remaining fleet of F-111As revealed 42 aircraft with the same potential failures, reflecting doubt on the conclusion of the Hotrod 73 Accident Board. It is speculated that this failure could also have contributed to the two other losses had the failure caused a pitch down while at low altitude. These losses caused a storm of controversy in the United States, with Wisconsin Senator William Proxmire denouncing the F-111A as an unsafe and defective plane. However, the Air Force and General Dynamics continued to work hard trying to fix the problems with the F-111A. Modifications to the F-111A took longer than expected, and the Wing was not fully operational until July 1971.

On 22 December 1969 a fatal F-111A accident occurred during a dive bombing mission on the Nellis Range. LTC Tom Mack and MAJ Jim Anthony were killed when the left wing separated from the aircraft (67049) and the aircraft was too low to allow for a safe ejection. Following the accident, moral was low as the F-111A fleet was grounded and as the crews awaited the results of the accident report and subsequent inspection of all of the aircraft. In an effort to raise moral, numerous initiatives were put in place. One included determining a mascot for the 474th. First Lieutenant (1LT) Howard Kotlicky, under the guidance and approval of the Wing Commander COL "Boots" Blesse, designed the 474th TFW "Roadrunner" mascot and "unofficial" patch. The patch was subsequently created and made available to all of the Wing and painted, in a giant size, on the roof of one of the F-111A hangars. Subsequently, the 474th TFW became known as the "Roadrunners."

In September 1971, as part of the buildup of the Wing to combat-ready status, the Wing started receiving experienced aircraft commanders from the ongoing phase-out of the Century Series fighters such as the F-101, F-102 and, especially, the F-100, as well as from other aircraft. Associated with this remanning effort, the Wing also started receiving "new" pilot weapon systems operators (PWSO) directly from graduating pilot training classes, providing a basis for future F-111 experienced aircraft commanders throughout the F-111 fleets worldwide. The Combat Lancer deployment had included right seat PWSOs, but these were previously fully-qualified F-4 pilots who were "unhappily conscripted" for the position. After July 1971, the 474th gradually assumed additional operational responsibilities and the various squadrons "certified" crews on a variety of world-wide targets in support of potential wartime scenarios, including targets in Cuba and the Eastern Bloc. During this period, training became very safety oriented and the Wing restricted TFR night flight to visual flight rules conditions at a minimum altitude of 1000 feet above ground level, typically flown at 480 knots true airspeed. Multiple low-level routes had been established throughout the western U.S., and these became the primary routes for training and practice bombing on the Nellis Range, Holbrook, Arizona Radar Bomb Site (RBS), and other bombing and electronic warfare ranges in the West. These training practices would later prove to be inadequate in the high-threat environment and varied and sometimes extreme terrain and intense rain conditions of North Vietnam and Laos.

==== Operation Linebacker ====
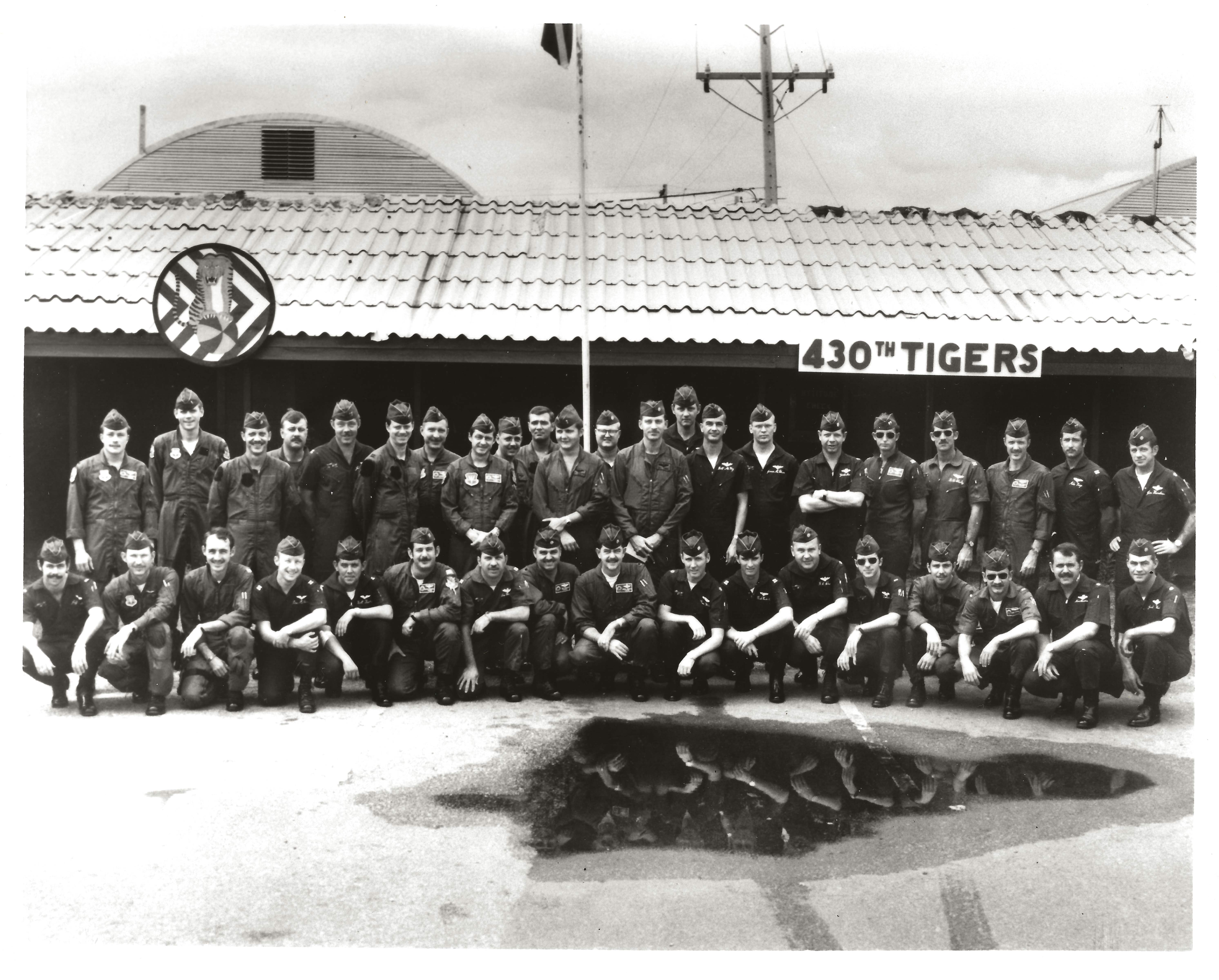
430th TFS Takhli RTAFB 14 Nov 1972 (25 crew missing due to other duties and 4 MIA)

On 14 August 1972 the Air Force issued an Air Tasking Order (ATO) "frag order" for deployment of the 474th TFW. The 474th returned to Takhli in September 1972 with the Constant Guard V deployment of the 429th and 430th TFSs with 48 F-111As under the command of Wing Commander COL William R. Nelson. The deployment included 1,620 personnel and 40 transport aircraft loads of cargo. The enhanced strike capabilities of the two F-111A squadrons (48 aircraft) allowed them to replace the four F-4D squadrons (72 aircraft) of the 49th TFW (see 49th Wing), which returned to the U.S. This move also resulted in a reduction of total U.S. forces stationed in Thailand. The two F-111A squadrons arrived to support the last month of Operation Linebacker and all of the Operation Linebacker II bombing offensive against North Vietnam, conducted combat operations in Laos including support of Operation Phou Phiang II and Operation Phou Phiang III using the F-111A's beacon bombing capability in the defense of Long Tieng, and conducted combat operations in Cambodia, again often using the F-111A's beacon bombing capability.

An integral part of the concept of operations for the Constant Guard V deployment was to demonstrate a minimal time from the deployment of the F-111A from the Continental US (CONUS) until the launch of the first F-111A combat operations. The deployment accomplished this in 27 hours, breaking all Air Force records. Tragically, this record was marred by the combat loss of an F-111A and its crew on their first mission. Twelve 429th F-111As departed Nellis on 27 September, arriving at Andersen Air Force Base, Guam on 28 September. After a 3-hour fueling stop, they departed Andersen on 28 September, using prepositioned fresh crews, and arrived at Takhli that day. Lieutenant Colonel Mat Mathiasen, commander of the 429th TFS flew the first F-111A (67086) into Takhli. Flight crews had been prepositioned by C-141 Starlifter at Takhli. The crews included six crews (three each) from the 429th and 430th Squadrons who had already been briefed on the concept of operations and threat assessment and had mission planned to fly the first strikes against North Vietnam. An additional 12 429th F-111As departed Nellis on 27 September arriving at Hickam Air Force Base (IATA code HIK) Hawaii the same day. They departed on 28 September arriving at Clark Air Base (IATA code CRK) Philippines on 29 September. They departed Clark on 30 September arriving at Takhli on the same Day. On 29 September, 24 F-111As of the 430th, led by the squadron commander LTC Gene Martin, left Nellis for Hickam. Twenty three F-111As departed Hickam on 30 September with 22 arriving at Clark on 1 October. One ground aborted at Hickam with maintenance issues and one diverted into Wake Island with low oil pressure in one engine. Because of complications for movement of units and supplies due to tropical storm Kathy, the 430th was unable to depart Clark for Takhli until 4 October, arriving at Takhli the same day.

Unlike the phased approach used by the other combat aircraft where the first 10 missions were to be flown in the lower threat areas of North Vietnam (Route Packages 1–4), the first F-111As were immediately assigned missions in Route Package 5 (RP5). The initial six sorties against North Vietnam were planned to be launched the same day (within 3–4 hours) of the arrival on 28 September (Thailand time) of the first aircraft from Nellis. The crews of the first 6 sorties were all highly experienced aircraft commanders (ACs) and mostly highly experienced Weapon System Operators (WSOs). All of the initial targets were in Yen Bai Province in RP5 and the weapons load for the six initial sorties were standardized using 12 Mk-82 Snake-Eye high-drag 500 pound bombs. This weapons load was optimized for low-altitude level bomb deliveries. After the loss of the second of the six first night missions, the last two scheduled missions were cancelled (one air abort and one ground abort) by higher headquarters. Combat sorties were not flown until 4 October, as 7th Air Force Headquarters directed that all crews fly one day and one night familiarization flight in Thailand prior to flying combat. This directive was not consistently applied to the arriving crews, as some received only a single familiarization sortie.

The mission for the F-111A was unique in that the crew was given a weapons load, intended target, and time on target. Everything else in terms of mission planning was left to the flight crew, including ingress, target area, and egress tactics, route, and deconfliction with other F-111As which may fly similar routes or hit nearby targets. The missions were planned without RB-66E electronic countermeasures escort aircraft, air defense suppression aircraft, MiG Cap, or Boeing KC-135 Stratotankers. Initial tactics were all night low-level using TFR and intended for deep strikes to support Operation Linebacker. Airspeed was generally no less than 480 knots, with many crews using 510 or 540 KTAS in the high-threat environment prior to weapons delivery. The development of high-drag weapons had not kept up with the development of the F-111A as a platform to deliver those weapons and this deficiency was later identified in the analysis of the F-111A's performance during the war. As a result, the F-111A was forced to decrease its speed to 500 KTAS maximum for the release of high-drag bombs at low altitude to preclude ripping the high-drag fins off the bombs. TFR altitude was generally tied to the threat level, starting at 1000 feet AGL and descending to as low as 200 feet in the high-threat environment. The 200 foot altitude was available as an automatic TFR altitude, but crews had the option to manually fly the aircraft as low as 100 feet with the aid of the TFR guidance systems. This option was used on a very limited basis depending on the perceived threat from surface-to-air missiles (SAMs). Altitude was typically inversely related to the Radar Homing and Warning System (APS109/ALR41) indications from SAM sites - the more threatening the signal the lower the TFR altitude. Egress speeds were generally limited to high sub-sonic speeds at TFR altitudes to avoid the use of afterburner which could light up the aircraft and provide a visual target for ground gunners. Restricting the F-111 to military power, however, did not prevent low altitude egress speeds from occasionally exceeding 660 KTAS. On climb out, once clear of the high-threat area, crews often accelerated to Mach 1.3 - the limiting speed on the external ALQ-87 jammer pods - once it was confirmed that there were no hung bombs (bombs that failed to release). Initially, bomb loads for low-altitude deliveries not only included 12 Mk-82 High Drag (HD) 500 pound bombs for level delivery but also included 4 Mk-84 2000 pound slick bombs using a stabilized climb bomb release. The Mk-84 load, however, was highly dangerous to the delivery aircraft in that the fragmentation envelope was 2500 feet which forced the F-111A well out of its TFR altitudes and well into the air defense threat environment. After the first 2 aircraft losses, low-altitude bomb deliveries were generally restricted to 12 Mk-82 HDs and the Mk-84 loading was eliminated as a low-level option. The first loss occurred on the first night, Ranger 23, aircraft 67078, flown by MAJ Bill Coltman (a Combat Lancer veteran) and PWSO 1LT Lefty Brett of the 430th TFS. Their target was the Yen Son military storage facility southeast of Yen Bai airfield in RP5. The wreckage was discovered in Laos and remains were identified on 12/19/2001. Following the loss, F-111A combat operations were paused to allow for a maintenance shakedown of all of the aircraft and to allow for a local area orientation and review of tactics for the crews. Immediately following the loss, a Search and Rescue (SAR) effort was initiated covering approximately 8400 square miles of Laos and North Vietnam, to no avail. It was terminated on 10 October. F-111A combat operations were reinitiated on 5 October against Linebacker targets (lines of communication, rail yards, marshalling and supply areas, and other targets) using the modified low-level tactics. Crews were generally given one mission in the RP1-4 regions and one mission in the RP5 region prior to missions in RP6 to build confidence and experience. The second aircraft loss occurred on 16 October - Coach 33, flown by CPT Jim Hockridge and 1LT Al Graham of the 429th TFS, in aircraft 67060. Their target was the Dai Loi railroad bridge on the Northwest Railroad northwest to Phuc Yen Airfield in RP6. The North Vietnamese claimed the shootdown and presented the aircrew's ID cards. The weapons load was 4 Mk-84 2000 pound bombs. A thorough SAR effort was conducted following the loss, again to no avail. The aircraft wreckage and remains were identified on 25 October 1977. Following the loss, another reevaluation of tactics occurred and the use of "slick" bombs in low-altitude deliveries was terminated except for in extraordinary situations. F-111A night low-level strikes continued against North Vietnam until President Nixon ordered the cessation of strikes north of the 20th parallel on 23 October. The F-111A strikes to date demonstrated that the North Vietnamese surface-to-air missiles (SAMs) and MiGs were ineffective in countering the low-level F-111A, and the North Vietnamese focused more on the use of small arms and anti-aircraft artillery (AAA) against the F-111A.

Following the 23 October bombing halt and until the initiation of Linebacker II operations on 18 December, F-111A operations focused on the southern portions of North Vietnam in RP1 again using low-level night tactics, and on Laos. The operations in RP1 were against lines of communications, storage areas, air defenses, and other targets. There were 402 sorties flow in RP1 in November. The third loss occurred on 7 November. MAJ Bob Brown and MAJ Bob Morrissey of the 430th TFS, Whaler 57, flying 67063, were lost on a night low-level mission in RP1. Their target was the Luat Son highway Ferry and Ford Complex in RP1. The wreckage was later found on 3 July 1992. On 8 November 1972, the F-111As flew 20 strikes over North Vietnam in weather that grounded other aircraft. The fourth loss occurred on 20 November. Aircraft 67092 was flown by CPT Bob Stafford and CPT Chuck Caffarelli of the 430th TFS, Burger 54, flying a night low-level mission in RP1 against the Co Giang Transhipment Point and using a "feet wet" egress over the South China Sea. Wreckage of this aircraft washed onshore in South Vietnam, indicating aircraft impact with the sea with wings swept to 72 degrees and no indication of crew ejection.

==== Operation Phou Phiang II ====
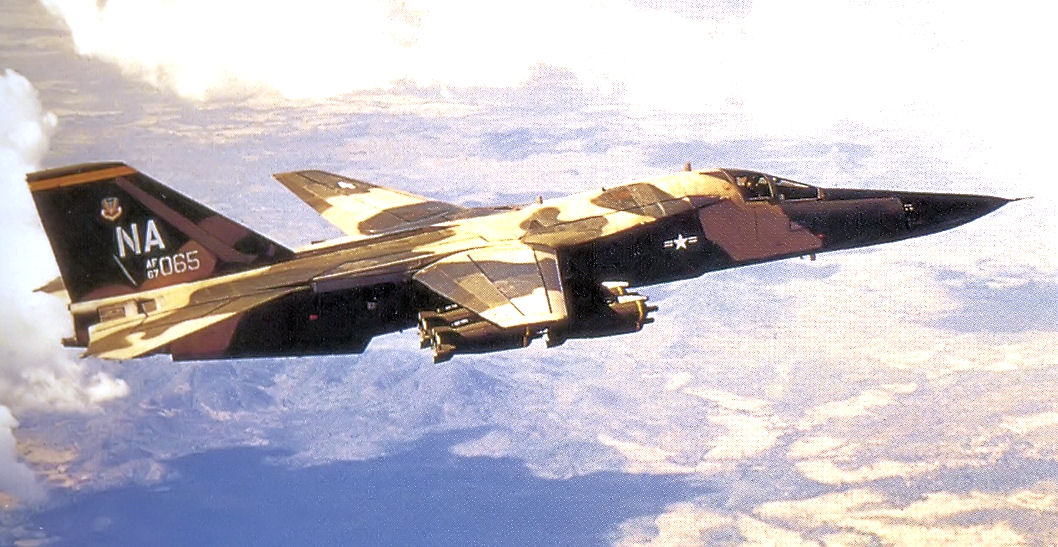
429th Tactical Fighter Squadron F-111A with 16 CBU-52 (Note: Aircraft is General Dynamics F-111A serial 67065 over Southeast Asia)

On 21 October 1972 COL Bill Nelson, Wing Commander, received a request from the Ambassador of Laos to send an F-111A crew to Vientiane Laos to meet with the Ambassador's air attache. The crew, COL Bob Anderson and MAJ Harry Richard, was briefed on the upcoming North Vietnam Army (NVA) offensive against Skyline Ridge which overlooks Long Tieng and inquired if the F-111A had the capability to support the ongoing Operation Phou Phiang II to counter the North Vietnamese Army (NVA). The answer to the question added a new dimension to F-111 operations with the use of the AN/PPN-18 Radar Beacon for offset bombing in support of friendly forces. This represented a major departure from the initial concept of employment for the aircraft. Radar beacons were deployed under Operation Sentinel Lock at key mountain top locations and used as offset aiming points for medium altitude delivery of 24 MK-82 500 pound bombs or 16 CBU-52 or CBU-58. This technique enabled the F-111A to strike targets developed by Raven FACs, Forward Air Guides, or ground commanders, regardless of day/night or weather conditions, occasionally within 200 meters of friendly forces. Beacons allowed a flexibility to strike preplanned fixed targets or, unique to the F-111, be diverted to real-time high-priority targets in support of troops in contact. Additionally, when weather hindered other aircraft from striking their targets, the F-111A would be used as a pathfinder to guide accompanying F-4 and A-7 aircraft to area targets and provide the bomb release signal. The first successful F-111A beacon bombing mission was flown on 11 November 1972. In an excerpt from a letter by General Vang Pao, Commanding General of Military Region II to the Commander, 474th TFW, "Prior to your arrival in MR II, the enemy had plans and high hopes for offensives against Long Tieng. The F-111A, WHISPERING DEATH as it is called, has changed all of that ... your bombs, falling in inclement weather and at all hours of the night have had telling effect on the moral of the North Vietnamese 316th Division. Where once he was making plans to attack, he is now feverishly trying to avoid destruction from the sky." Per Yer Pao Sher, a Laotian Commander North of the Plain de Jars, the F-111s were more valuable in countering the North Vietnamese than their own 105mm and 155mm howitzers, mines and rockets. They assessed that, had the war in Laos continued, the F-111 would have destroyed every sizeable North Vietnamese unit in Military Region II. In December alone, the F-111 flew 522 sorties in Laos, the most of any U.S. aircraft type. The successful beacon bombing program was greatly expanded to include beacons compatible with B-52s being placed alongside those being used by the F-111. The F-111As continued beacon bombing strikes supporting Operation Phou Phiang III, 18 January - March 1973. By the end of the Laos conflict on April 17, 1973, 2392 F-111A sorties had been flown using 7 beacon locations with 91% effectiveness. The last sorties against Laos were flown on 15–17 April, 40 by B-52s and 24 by the F-111As.

==== Operation Linebacker II ====
Unofficial F-111 Linebacker II Patch

During Linebacker II, 18 December 1972 - 29 December 1972, the F-111A flew 154 low-level night missions against critical targets in the high-threat air defense environment of RP6 with two aircraft losses. The Linebacker II operations were flown while the F-111A continued to conduct beacon bombing operations in Laos. The Linebacker II targets included SAM sites (while supporting B-52 strikes), airfields (Bach Mai Airfield, Kep Air Base, Yen Bai Air Base, Hoa Lac Air Base, Phuc Yen Air Base), rail bridges and yards (Bac Giang, Cao Nung, Duc Noi and others), storage areas (Gia Thuong), lines of communications (Hanoi Radio, Lang Truoc), power generation (Bac Giang, Viet Tri), the Hanoi docks, and other targets. The next loss occurred on the first night of Linebacker II, on 18 December. Snug 40, aircraft 67099, was flown by LTC Ron Ward and Major Jim McElvain of the 430th TFS. Their target was the Hanoi International Communications (RADCOM) transmitter in RP6. The crew had called off target and had planned to go "feet wet" over the Tonkin Gulf. The aircraft disappeared soon after going feet wet and wreckage and remains have never been recovered. The 6th and final F-111A combat loss occurred on 22 December. Jackel 33, aircraft 67068, flown by CPT Bob Sponeybarger and 1LT Bill Wilson of the 429th TFS, ejected successfully after being hit by ground fire near Hanoi. Their target was the Hanoi Docks on the Red River in RP6. CPT Sponeybarger was captured after 3 days and 1LT Wilson spent a week in escape and evasion (E&E) before being captured. Both were repatriated on 29 March 1973 after serving time as POWs.

The Paris Peace Talks, on 23 January 1973, resulted in an agreement to terminate all U.S. combat operations against North Vietnam effective 28 January 1973 Saigon time. On 15 January the USAF restricted all air strikes on North Vietnam to south of the 20th parallel. The last U.S. air strikes on North Vietnam occurred on 27 January. The 429th and 430th TFS flew slightly more than 4000 combat missions between late September 1972 and mid-March 1973 with excellent success rates in hitting targets even when visibility was near zero. A total of six aircraft were lost in action. The loss rate was assessed to be "remarkably similar" to that of the Navy A-6 and Air Force F-105 when flying night terrain-following operations. The 474th was awarded the Air Force Outstanding Unit Award with Combat "V" Device 28 Sep 1972-22 Feb 1973 and Republic of Vietnam Gallantry Cross with Palm 28 Sep 1972-22 Feb 1973.

Following the fourth loss, Burger 54, on 20 November, General John D. Ryan, Chief of Staff of the Air Force directed an investigation team, led by Brigadier General Charles A. Gabriel, to conduct a "comprehensive inquiry and review of all F-111 losses of undetermined causes." Prior to the completion of the report, designated "Constant Sweep", two additional F-111As had been lost during the conduct of Linebacker II. The Constant Sweep Report concluded "Two of the aircraft apparently crashed in the mountains while attempting to penetrate an area of rain storms that degraded the aircraft's terrain following radar and disoriented the aircrews [Ranger 23 and Whaler 57]. Two of the aircraft crashed in the vicinity of the target, having been shot down or crashing during a maneuver to evade enemy air defenses, or through self-fragmentation during low-altitude weapons delivery [Coach 33 and Jackel 33]. The remaining two aircraft most likely crashed in the Gulf of Tonkin due to a limitation or failure of the Low Altitude Radar Altimeter (LARA) system [Burger 54 and Snug 40]." More current evidence indicates that the loss of Majors Brown and Morrisey (Whaler 57) was, in fact, due to a possible shoot-down by enemy air defenses. Per the Joint POW/MIA Accounting Command in 2011: "Available evidence establishes that LTC Robert M. BROWN and LTC Robert D. Morrissey died in Quang Binh Province, Vietnam, on 7 November 1972 when their F-111A "Aardvark" aircraft crashed after being damaged by enemy fire. In 1995 a joint U.S./S.R.V. team excavated the crash site of a USAF F-111A in Quang Binh Province. Wreckage found at the site confirms that both crewmen were on board at the time of impact and did not survive the crash. The team also recovered a single fragment of human bone. Forensic technology available in the late 1990s and early 2000s precluded an identification; however, recent laboratory analysis, primarily mtDNA testing, now allows for the remains to be attributed to Robert M. Brown to the exclusion of all other reasonable possibilities."

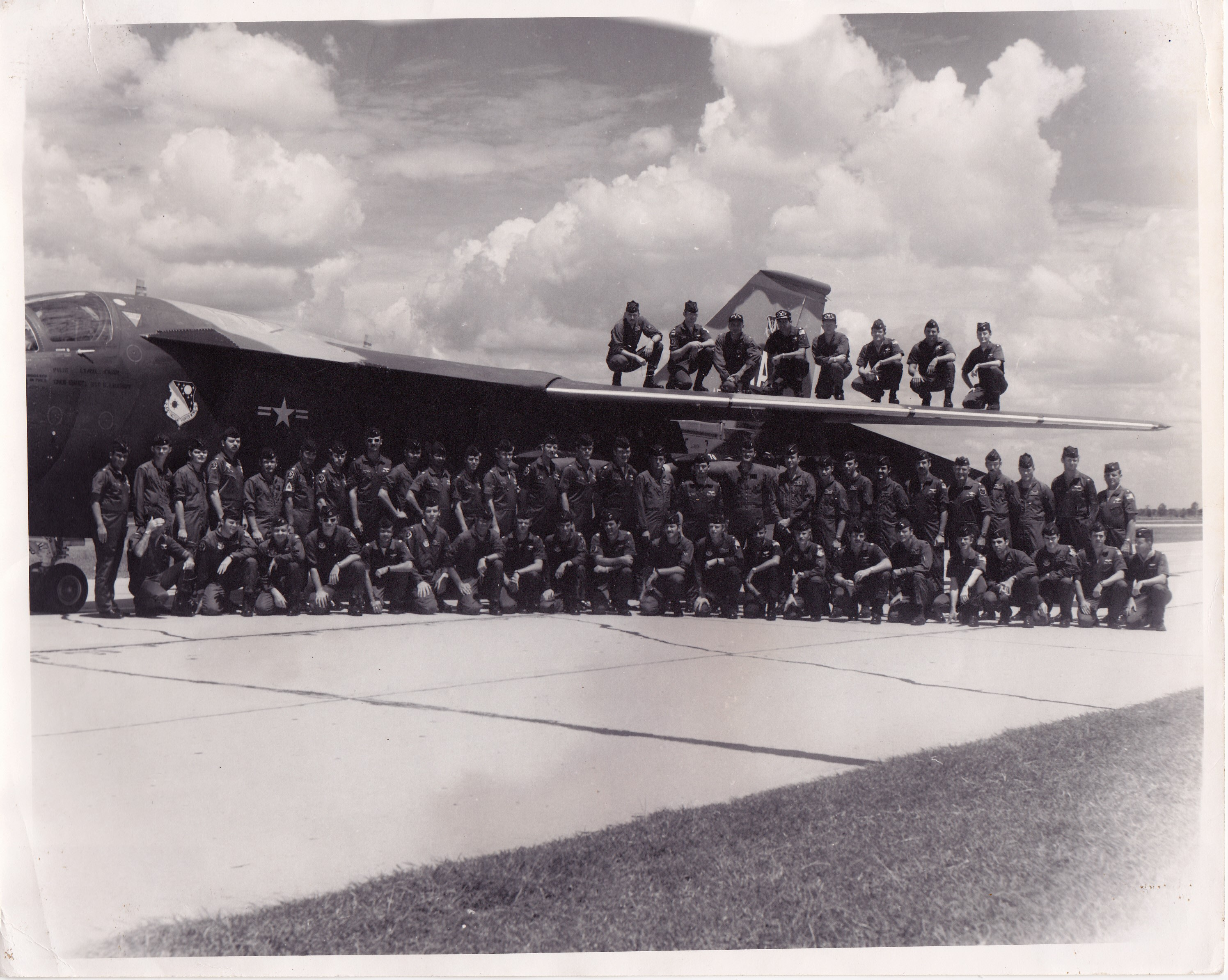
428th TFS Personnel and F-111A at Takhli RTAFB 1973

The 429th and 430th and, later, the 428th (which replaced the 429th TFS on 8 January 1973) also flew bombing missions against targets in Laos and Cambodia in the midst of the monsoon season. In March 1973 the USAF started inserting 10 beacons in Cambodia. The F-111As again demonstrated they could bomb through an overcast as close as 200 meters from friendly forces. This capability saved Neak Luong from being overrun by enemy forces. On 20 March 1973, LTC Gene Martin, 430th TFS Commander, and MAJ Bill Young flew the last combat sortie by the 430th. The 428th and 429th continued to conduct beacon bombing and Pathfinder operations in Cambodia as part of the 474th until 30 July 1973. On 30 July the 347th Tactical Fighter Wing assumed control of the 428th TFS and 429th TFS and continued combat operations in Cambodia until the termination of combat air operations on 15 August 1973. On 7 June 1973 CPT Chris Russo and 1LT Chuck Foster of the 429th TFS were the first F-111 crew to fly 100 combat missions in the F-111A. The 474th Tactical Fighter Wing completed slightly more than 4000 combat sorties from 28 September 1972 through 30 June 1973.

On 23 June 2017 a bronze plaque, conceived by former 474th TFW members and created by artist and sculptor Jim Nance, was dedicated to the 474th TFW organization and the F-111A crews at the Southeast Asia Memorial Pavilion at the United States Air Force Academy. The plaque hangs in honor of the bravery and dedication of all who supported and participated in the 474th TFW F-111A combat operations in Southeast Asia in 1968 and 1972–1973.

The 430th returned to the 474th Wing at Nellis on 22 March 1973 (replaced by the 429th TFW on 18 March 1973) assuming a replacement training unit mission, while the 428th and 429th were assigned to the newly transferred 347th Tactical Fighter Wing at Mountain Home Air Force Base (IATA code MUO), Idaho on 30 July 1973 (deployed to Takhli Royal Thai Air Force Base). The 347th's F-111As continued to support combat operations in Cambodia until all U.S. air strikes terminated on 15 August 1973. With the end of hostilities in Southeast Asia and the 474th's return to Nellis, its mission was again to train combat-ready forces of aircrews and maintain a rapid-reaction capability to execute fighter attacks against enemy forces and facilities in time of crisis.

==== Operation Ready Switch ====
On 19 July 1975 the Constant Guard V deployment was completed and the 428th and 429th were reassigned to the 474th TFW, Nellis AFB. The last operational F-111As left Nellis for Mountain Home Air Force Base on 2 August 1977 and COL Mo Seaver relinquished control of the 474th to COL Reginald Davis on 5 August as the F-111A aircraft and crews were transferred to the 366th Tactical Fighter Wing as part of Operation Ready Switch. The F-111A wing left behind at Nellis 3 "hangar queens" that needed maintenance and Functional Check Flights (FCFs), tail numbers 67056, 67038, and 67102. These were accomplished and the last 474th TFW F-111A to leave Nellis AFB was 67102, flown on 9 August 1977 to McClellan AFB (IATA code MCC) for overhaul by F-111A Functional Check Flight (FCF) pilot CPT Roger (Pete) Peterson and an Australian Air Force exchange Weapon System Operator.

=== F-4D and F-16A/B Operations ===
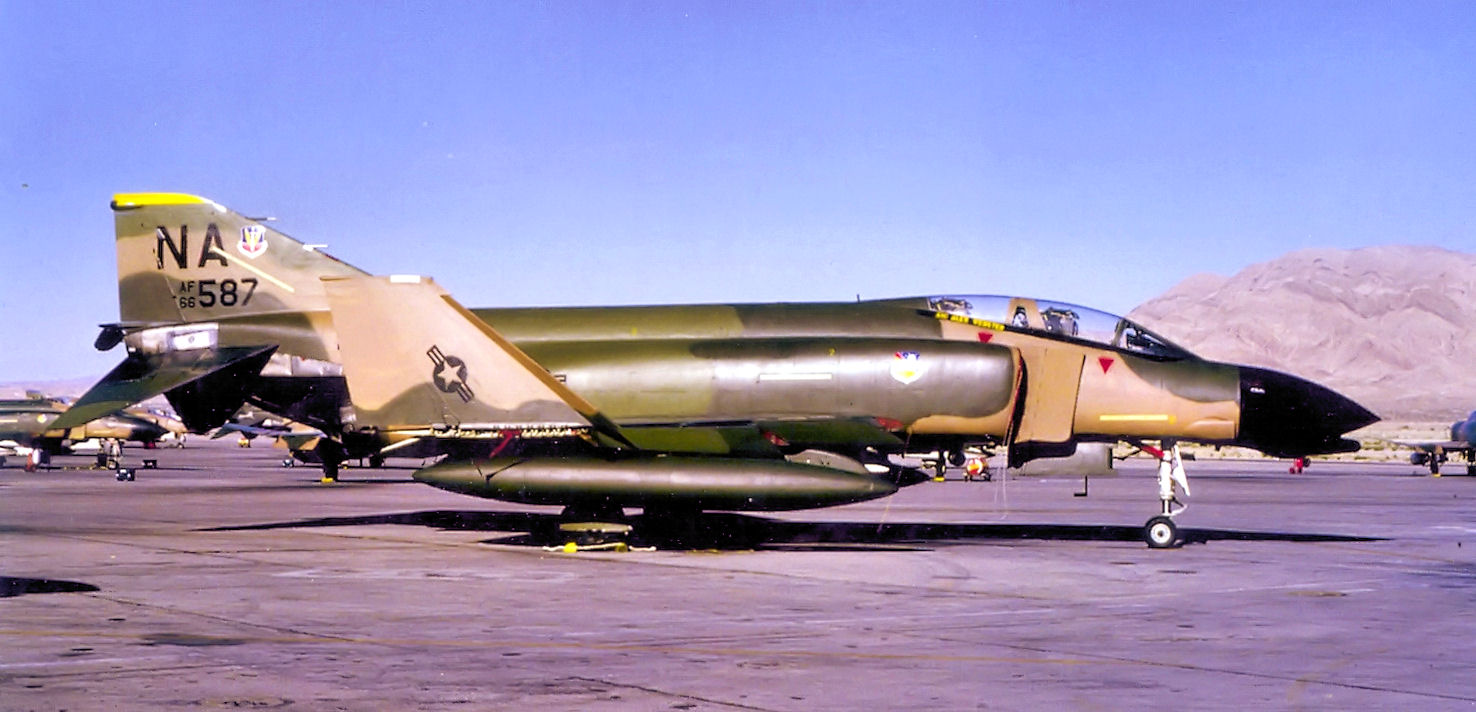
429th TFS F-4D Phantom about 1979

The 474th Tactical Fighter Wing absorbed the McDonnell F-4 Phantom II aircraft, crews, and resources of the inactivating 4474th Tactical Fighter Wing, which had been activated on 1 March 1977 at Nellis on 5 August 1977, as part of Operation Ready Switch. The 48th Tactical Fighter Wing F-4D Phantoms had been rotated from Lakenheath Air Base (IATA code LKZ) in Europe in order for the F-111Fs, previously stationed at Mt. Home AFB, to be stationed at Lakenheath Air Base to give USAF assets in Europe a greater range, weapons carriage, and all-weather capable strike capability. With the transfer of the F-4D from Lakenheath to Nellis, Chesley Burnett Sullenberger III (Sully) was then assigned to the 428th TFS where he attained the rank of captain and served as a flight lead, training officer, and Operation Red Flag Blue Force Mission Commander. The F-4D had a relatively short life, being replaced with new General Dynamics F-16A Fighting Falcons. The 474th was the third USAF wing to receive Fighting Falcons. It received its first Block 1/5 F-16A/Bs in November 1980, later operated Block 10 F-16A/Bs.

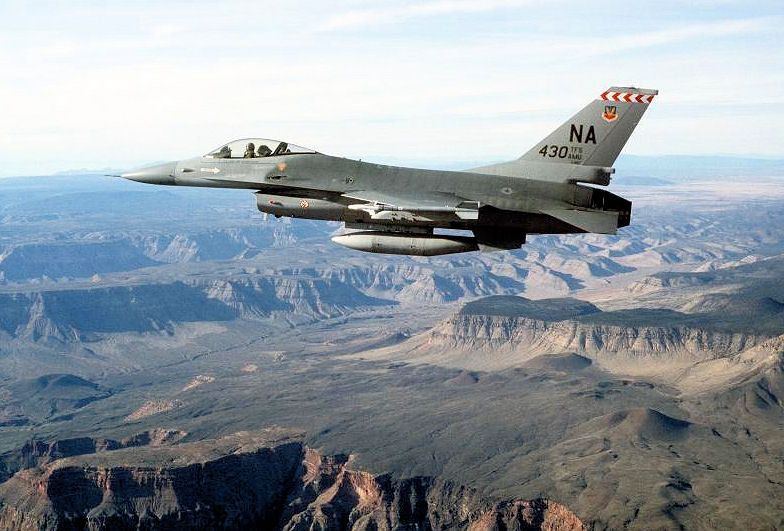
430 TFS F-16A Block 10C 80-0492 flying over the Grand Canyon in 1986

The Wing conducted routine Tactical Air Command training and deployments from Nellis with the F-16s, retaining the Block 10/15 models until September 1989, when the Wing was inactivated, the F-16As no longer being considered as front-line aircraft. Instead of re-equipping the wing, the F-16As were transferred to Air National Guard and Air Force Reserve squadrons, and the three squadrons resurfacing as General Dynamics-Grumman EF-111A Raven Electronic Warfare Squadrons with the 27th Operations Group (27th Tactical Fighter Wing) at Cannon Air Force Base, New Mexico.

== Lineage ==
- Predecessor Unit 474th Fighter Group constituted on 26 May 1943

Activated on 1 August 1943
Inactivated on 8 December 1945

- Established as the 474th Fighter Bomber Wing on 25 June 1952

Activated on 10 July 1952
Inactivated on 8 November 1954

- Activated on 8 October 1957

Redesignated 474th Tactical Fighter Wing on 1 July 1958
Inactivated on 30 September 1989

=== Assignments ===
- Tactical Air Command, 10 July 1952 – 8 November 1954 (attached to 58th Fighter-Bomber Wing after 1 April 1953)
- 832d Air Division, 8 October 1957
- USAF Tactical Fighter Weapons Center, 20 January 1968
- 832d Air Division, 20 March 1968 (attached to Seventh Air Force, Advanced Echelon (ADVON), c. 27 Sep 1972 – c. 23 March 1973)
- Twelfth Air Force, 1 July 1975 – 30 September 1989

=== Components ===
- 474th Fighter-Bomber Group: 10 July 1952 – 8 November 1954
- 428th Fighter-Bomber Squadron (later 428th Tactical Fighter Squadron): 8 October 1957 – 30 July 1973; 15 June 1975 – 30 September 1989
- 429th Fighter-Bomber Squadron (later 429th Tactical Fighter Squadron): 8 October 1957 – 30 July 1973; 21 June 1975 – 30 September 1989
- 430th Fighter-Bomber Squadron (later 430th Tactical Fighter Squadron): 8 October 1957 – 15 November 1966; 15 September 1968 – 30 September 1989
- 442d Tactical Fighter Training Squadron: 15 October 1969 – 31 July 1977
- 478th Fighter-Bomber Squadron (later 478th Tactical Fighter Squadron): 8 October 1957 – 1 November 1966 (often detached)
- 4474th Tactical Training Squadron, 1 December 1968 – 15 June 1970 (not operational)
- 4527th Combat Crew Training Squadron, 20 January 1968 – 15 October 1969

=== Stations ===
- Misawa Air Base, Japan, 10 July 1952
- Kunsan Air Base, Korea, 10 July 1952
- Taegu Air Base, Korea, 1 April 1953 – 22 November 1954
- Clovis Air Force Base (later Cannon Air Force Base), New Mexico, 8 October 1957 – 15 September 1965
- Nellis Air Force Base, Nevada 10 January 1968 - 30 September 1989

=== Aircraft ===
- Republic F-84E Thunderjet, 1952–1953
- F-100D Super Sabre, 1957–1965
- General Dynamics F-111A, 1968–1977
- McDonnell F-4D Phantom II, 1977–1981
- General Dynamics F-16 Fighting Falcon, 1980–1989

=== Commanders ===
- COL William W. Ingenhutt, 10 July 1952 – 1 April 1953
- COL Franklin H. Scott, 8 Oct 1957
- LTC Jake L. Wilk, Jr., 15 Jul 1958
- COL Thomas D. Robertson, 19 Jul 1958
- COL William L. Curry, 8 Aug 1958
- COL Gust Askounis, 30 Jul 1960
- COL William L. Mitchell, Jr., 18 Aug 1960
- COL Niven K. Cranfill, 6 Jun 1962
- COL Francis E. Binnell, 21 Aug 1964
- COL Paul P. Douglas, Jr., 3 Sep 1964
- LTC Benjamin H. Clayton, 14 Jul 1965
- COL Oscar L. Watson, 28 Aug 1965
- 1LT Robert R. De Cocco, 15 Sep 1965 (additional duty)
- COL Ivan H. Dethman, 1 Oct 1966 - 9 Aug 1967
- LTC Maurice A. Spenney, 9 Aug 1967 - Unk
- COL Chester L. Van Etten, 20 Jan 1968 - 11 Jun 1969
- COL Carmen M. Shook, 20 Jun 1968 - 5 Jun 1969
- COL Frederick C. Blesse, 5 Jun 1969 - 26 Jun 1970
- COL Herbert L. Gavin, 26 Jun 1970 - 22 Jun 1971
- COL Kenneth P. Miles, 22 Jun 1971 - 1 Aug 1972
- COL William R. Nelson, 1 Aug 1972 - 25 Jul 1973
- COL James N. McClelland, 25 Jul 1973 - 28 Feb 1975
- COL Thomas E. Wolters, 28 Feb 1975 - 24 May 1976
- COL Maurice E. Seaver Jr., 24 May 1976 - 5 Aug 1977
- COL Reginald Davis, 5 August 1977 - Unk
- COL Donald L. Miller, unk - 1 May 1979
- COL James B. Davis, May 1979 - May 1980
- COL Charles A. Horner, May 1980 - August 1981
- COL Michael C. Kerby, Jr. August 1981 - May 1982
- COL Maurice B. Johnston, May 1982 - ?

== Bibliography ==
- "430 Expeditionary Electronic Combat Squadron (ACC)". Air Force Historical Research Agency. USAF.
- "474th Fighter Group". U.S. War Memorials.
- "474th Fighter Group". American Air Museum in Britain.
- "474th Fighter Group". Army Air Corps Library and Museum.
- "474th Fighter Bomber Group". Korean War Project.
- "474th Fighter Bomber Group" (PDF). USAF In History.
- "474th Fighter Bomber Wing". KoreanWar.org.
- "F-111 Plaque Dedication". Facebook.
- "F111 Crew Cited For 100 Missions In Southeast Asia Conflict". Stars and Stripes. 23 June 1973.
- "F111s Going To Thailand". Las Vegas Review-Journal. 26 September 1972.
- "P-38 Museum". P-38 National Association and Museum.
- "AF Veteran Flew Missions in F-100 Super Sabre in Vietnam". News Tribune.
- Anthony, Victor B.; Sexton, Richard R. (1993). "The War In Northern Laos 1958-1973". The United States Air Force in Southeast Asia. DTIC ADA512223. Washington D.C.: Center for Air Force History. UNCLASSIFIED.
- Ballard, Jack S. (1984). "1961-1973: An Illustrated Account". The United States Air Force in Southeast Asia. DTIC ADA160932. Washington D.C.: Center for Air Force History. UNCLASSIFIED.
- Brammer, Kenneth L. (2010). U.S. Army 9th Air Force 474th Fighter Group With Lockheed Lightnings. Author.
- Davies, Peter E. (20 February 2014). F-111 & EF-111 Units In Combat. Great Britain: Osprey Publishing Ltd. ISBN 978-1-78200-347-2.
- Davies, Peter (2013). General Dynamics F-111 Aardvark. Great Britain: Osprey Publishing Ltd. ISBN 978-1-78096-611-3.
- Davies, Peter E.; Thornborough, Anthony M. (1997). F-111 Aardvark. Ramsbury, Marlborough Wiltshire. UK: The Crowood Press Ltd. ISBN 1-86126-079-2.
- Defense POW/MIA Accounting Agency, (PMSEA) (24 April 2020). "Report for Air Force". Accounted for - Identified Since 1973.
- Drendel, Lou (1978). F-111 in Action. Warren, MI, USA: Squadron/Signal Publications, Inc. ISBN 0-89747-083-4.
- Elder, Major (15 April 1974). "Air Operations In The Khmer Republic 1 Dec 1971 - 15 Aug 1973". CHECO/CORONA HARVEST Division, DCS/Plans and Operations, HQ PACAF. DTIC ADB355566. Project CHECO Report (Special Project). Hq USAF: Department of the Air Force. UNCLASSIFIED.
- Endicott, Judy G., ed. (2001). The USAF In Korea: Campaigns, Units, and Stations: 1950–1953 (PDF). Washington D.C.: Air Force Historical Research Agency.
- Foss, LtC W. (August 1968). "Deployment of First F-111 Squadron to SEA". IRIS Record. 01139117. Chief of Staff, U.S. Air Force.
- Futrell, Robert F. (1983). The United States Air Forces in Korea 1950–1953 (PDF). Washington, DC: Office of Air Force History. ISBN 0-912799-71-4.
- Gunston, Bill. F-111. New York: Charles Scribner's Sons, 1978. ISBN 0-684-15753-5.
- Gunston, Bill. F-111, (Modern Fighting Aircraft, Vol. 3). New York: Salamander Books, 1983. ISBN 0-668-05904-4.
- Hays, Jack R. Wing Historian (1973). Constant Guard V Vol 1 1 October Through 31 December 1972. Vol. History 474th Tactical Fighter Wing.
- Hays, Jack R. Wing Historian (1973). Constant Guard V Vol 2 1 October Through 31 December 1972. Vol. History 474th Tactical Fighter Wing.
- Hays, Jack R. Wing Historian (1973). Constant Guard V 1 January Through 31 March 1973. Vol. History 474th Tactical Fighter Wing.
- Hays, Jack R. Wing Historian (1973). Constant Guard V 1 April Through 30 June 1973. Vol. History 474th Tactical Fighter Wing.
- Hays, Jack R. Wing Historian (1973). History of the 474th Tactical Fighter Wing (TAC) 1 July Through 30 September 1973. Vol. History 474th Tactical Fighter Wing.
- Holland, Thomas D. PhD (12 December 2011). "Identification of CIL 1995-030-I-01". Joint POW/MIA Accounting Command. Memorandum For The Record.
- Benoit, Lou; Hyre, Steven (2012). One-Eleven Down - F-111 Crashes and Combat Losses. Atglen, PA. USA: Schiffer Publishing LTD. ISBN 978-0-7643-4278-3.
- Jones, David C. USAF Chief of Staff (30 June 1976). "Air Force Outstanding Unit Award (with Combat V Device)". Special Order GB-489.
- Jones, David C. USAF Chief of Staff (25 April 1977). "Award of the Republic of Vietnam Galantry Cross with Palm". Special Order GB-322.
- Krebs, Richard H. (23 September 1972). "474TFW JCS Directed Deployment Nellis AFB NV to ****". Special Order TA-2889. Request and Authorization For Temporary Duty - Military (179 Days). HQ 57th CMBT SPT GP (TAC).
- Martin, Patrick (1994). Tail Code: The Complete History of USAF Tactical Aircraft Tail Code Markings. Atglen, PA: Schiffer Military Aviation History. ISBN 0-88740-513-4.
- Maurer, Maurer (1983). Air Force Combat Units of World War II (PDF). Washington, D.C.: Office of Air Force History. ISBN 0-912799-02-1. Archived from the original (PDF) on 20 December 2016.
- McConnell, Malcolm (1995). Inside Hanoi's Secret Archives. New York: Simon & Schuster. ISBN 0-671-87118-8.
- Mueller, Robert (1989). Air Force Bases, Vol. I, Active Air Force Bases Within the United States of America on 17 September 1982 (PDF). Washington, DC: Office of Air Force History. ISBN 0-912799-53-6.
- Nance, Jim. "General Dynamics F-111A". Jim Nance Sculpture. Jim Nance.
- Parker Jr., James E. (1997). Covert Ops - The CIA's Secret War In Laos. New York, NY. USA: St. Martin's Press. ISBN 0312963408.
- Picinich, A.A. (21 February 1974). Radzykewycz, D.T. (ed.). "The F-111 In Southeast Asia September 1972 - January 1973". CHECO/CORONA HARVEST Division, DCS/Plans and Operations, HQ PACAF. DTIC ADC007778. Project CHECO Report (Special Project). Hq USAF: Department of the Air Force. UNCLASSIFIED.
- Ravenstein, Charles A. (1984). Air Force Combat Wings, Lineage & Honors Histories 1947–1977. Washington, DC: Office of Air Force History. ISBN 0-912799-12-9.
- Rickard, J. "474th Fighter Group". History of War.
- Rogers, Brian. (2005). United States Air Force Unit Designations Since 1978. Hinkley, UK: Midland Publications. ISBN 1-85780-197-0.
- Ryan, General John D. (22 January 1973). Constant Sweep Final Report Volume I. Washington D.C.: Department of the Air Force Assistant Chief of Staff Intelligence.
- Schlight, Josh (1996). "A War Too Long". The United States Air Force in Southeast Asia 1961-1975. DTIC ADA440394. Washington D.C.: Center for Air Force History. UNCLASSIFIED.
- Sine, Rick. "474th TFW Reunion". f111reunion.
- Swindt, Karl (1 January 1978). 429th Fighter Squadron: The Retail Gang- European Theater, World War II, Limited Edition (1st ed.). Sacramento, CA: Heritage Publications.
- Thompson, Wayne (2000). To Hanoi and Back. Washington D.C.: Smithsonian Institution Press. ISBN 1-56098-877-0.
- Thornborough, Anthony M.; Davies, Peter E. (1989). F-111: Success in Action. London: Arms & Armour Press Ltd. ISBN 0-85368-988-1.
- Thornborough, Tony (1993). F-111 Aardvark: USAF's Ultimate Strike Aircraft. Osprey Military Aircraft. Oxford, UK: Osprey Publishing. ISBN 1-85532-259-5.
- Tretter, Robert L. "Cpl". Together We Served.
