= Operation Phou Phiang II =

- Part of Laotian Civil War
Date	6 August – 25 October 1972
Location	Plain of Jars, Laos
Result	North Vietnamese repel Lao attack

Belligerents
Kingdom of Laos; Supported by United States	North Vietnam

Commanders and leaders
(Laos) Vang Pao (United States) James Parker; Raymond Seaborg †; George Bacon	(North Vietnam) Vũ Lập

Units involved
Groupements Mobile 24; Groupements Mobile 23; Groupements Mobile 22; Task Force Vang Pao; Bataillons Guerrier 105; Bataillons Guerrier 110; Bataillons Guerrier 209; Bataillons Guerrier 228; Bataillons Guerrier 233; Bataillons Guerrier 224; Groupements Mobile 30; Groupements Mobile 31; Groupements Mobile 15; Groupements Mobile 27; Groupements Mobile 26; Bataillon Guerrier 103; Bataillon Commando 607A; Bataillon Commando 609; Groupements Mobile 32; Groupements Mobile 28; 12th Brigade; 13th Brigade; Commando Raiders (Thailand) Two Thai battalions 21st Special Operations Squadron (Laos) RLAF air support	174th Regiment; 866th Independent Regiment; 148th Independent Regiment; 335th Independent Regiment; 88th Regiment; 42nd Artillery Battalion; 27th Dac Cong Battalion; 421st Dac Cong Battalion

Operation Phou Phiang II (6 August – 25 October 1972) was one of the final battles of the Laotian Civil War. It was an attempt to relieve the siege on the guerrilla headquarters at Long Tieng on the Plain of Jars. It was designed as a two phase attack consisting of five task forces of Thai mercenaries and Royalist guerrillas upon the People's Army of Vietnam invading Laos. Air superiority was used to direct over 100 air strike sorties daily to support the offense, and air mobility to shuffle attacking troops. A new radar bombing program by F-111 Aardvarks and B-52 Stratofortresses failed to cripple the Communist forces. Designed to overwhelm Communist defenses with its multiplicity, the five Lao task forces were defeated in detail by the Communists despite two new columns being improvised and introduced into the fray.

Key to the Lao defeat was the lack of competent staff work to coordinate the operation, the immaturity and carelessness of their troops, as well as a widespread outbreak of trench foot.

== Overview ==
The Kingdom of Laos contained a Communist insurrection from its moment of independence. U.S. financial and military support of Laos began in 1953, and intensified through the succeeding years as the Laotian Civil War heated up. In 1961, the Central Intelligence Agency began arming and training hill tribes guerrillas on and around the strategic Plain of Jars. The Hmong soldiers of L'Armée Clandestine would fight the invading People's Army of Vietnam until the ceasefire of February 1973.

== Background ==
In the aftermath of the January 1972 Campaign Z, and its two counters, Operation Strength I and Operation Strength II, the strategic Lao guerrilla base at Long Tieng was at serious risk of capture by the People's Army of Vietnam (PAVN) until the rainy season gummed up military operations. Royalist radio intercepts began reporting the withdrawal of the PAVN 312th Division as early as 26 April 1972. On 17 May 1972, the rains came. The 312th Division had been withdrawn from the Plain of Jars (PDJ) to fight in the Easter Offensive striking South Vietnam; this considerably weakened the Communist forces in northern Laos. The Vietnamese Communist supply lines began to literally bog down and wash out in the monsoon downpour.

== Order of battle ==
PAVN strength was reduced to four regiments; however, they had supporting arms. The 174th Regiment garrisoned Phou Phasai, Zebra Ridge, and a regimental headquarters. The 866th Independent Regiment occupied the Plain; it was supported by pairs of T-34 and PT-76 tanks, and of 85 mm and 122 mm field guns. The 148th and 335th Independent Regiments were reserve units. The 42nd Artillery Battalion had its ten artillery pieces manning three fire bases. Also available were two sapper units, the 27th and 421st Dac Cong Battalions; three anti-aircraft battalions; an armored unit equipped with six T-59 and two T-34 tanks, as well as four K-63 armored personnel carriers.

Opposed to them were a bewildering hodgepodge of Royalist Hmong guerrillas and Thai mercenaries in shifting assignments and alignments. During April and May 1972, three regimental-size guerrilla Groupements Mobile (GMs) were circulated south into Thailand for refurbishing—GMs 24, 23, and 22. Task Force Vang Pao, a formation of Thai mercenaries, contained at least six battalions. Five guerrilla battalions were stationed at Ban Pa Dong—Bataillons Guerrier (BGs) 105, 110, 209, 228, and 233. Another guerrilla battalion, BG 224, was stationed on Skyline Ridge, overlooking Long Tieng. Two reinforcement regiments would arrive from neighboring Military Region 3—GM 30 would be flown in on 18 May; GM 31 arrived on 2 July.

Air superiority for the guerrillas would be guaranteed. They were allotted up to 80 Royal Lao Air Force (RLAF) T-28 Trojan sorties daily for close air support. The U.S. Air Force pledged 20 daily close air support sorties by F-4 Phantom IIs and six by A-1 Skyraiders. Ten more Phantom sorties were promised for interdiction missions. The operation's daily air support also included a B-52 Arc Light strike (with two more on call), as well as one AC-130 and four AC-119 gunship sorties.

== Preliminary activities ==
With PAVN strength reduced to four regiments, the Royalist forces felt free to both refit their worn units and push the Vietnamese for territory. On 8 May, two Royalist columns moved out; one was aimed at Sam Thong, the other at Phou Phasai. On 11 May 1972, six Bataillons Commando (BCs) of Thai mercenaries recaptured the refugee relief center at Sam Thong; they established two artillery fire bases in the vicinity.

The Phou Phasai probe was a different matter. On 22 May, two Thai BCs that had been withdrawn in the midst of Operation Sinsay joined the fresh reinforcements of GM 30 to attack the mountaintop position the PAVN valued as a base for assaults on the Royalists. On the 25th, they were halted by the fresh PAVN troops that had manned the hilltop, and stalemated.

In late May, Laotian General Vang Pao flew to Washington, DC to lobby for support for an offensive. He updated William H. Sullivan, with whom he had worked for four years. Sullivan was noncommittal. Melvin Laird had some issues with the use of B-52 Stratofortresses as tactical air power. On the other hand, in a White House meeting with Henry Kissinger, he found an enthusiastic proponent for an offensive. Stuart Symington led the general to believe financial backing for the Laotian War would not be curtailed. With this backing, Vang Pao returned to Laos and to his war in Military Region 2.

GM 31 arrived on 2 July, and captured two hills overlooking a new PAVN supply road, Route 54. On 16 July, as GM 30 rotated out of action, GM 31 launched an assault on Phou Phasai from a differing direction. A variety of battalion-size assaults met with no more success.

== Operational planning ==
Operation Phou Phiang II
- Operational scope: Limited-objective offensive
- Planned: 26 July 1972, Udon Royal Thai Air Force Base
- Planned by: Vang Pao, CIA, Thai general
- Objective: Relieve the siege of Long Tieng
- Date: Began August 6, 1972
- Outcome: Offensive fails

Operation Phou Phiang II (Operation Plateau II) was planned at Udorn Royal Thai Air Force Base on 26 July 1972. Hmong General Vang Pao met with his two senior CIA advisers and the Thai general in charge of supplying mercenary troops to the "Secret War" in Laos. The tribal leader was worried about the Communist troops' continuing proximity to the guerrilla main base at Long Tieng.

For once, Vang Pao's American backers did not try to discourage a wet season offensive. Planning was based on the assumption that Vang Pao would have at least 11, and possibly 13, regiments available to him by mid-September 1972. By launching five small attacks, it was hoped that the Communist would be too overwhelmed to concentrate on one of them. A two phase plan of attack was formed. Phase one, planned to start on 15 August, would draw PAVN reinforcements southwestward of the Plain of Jars while capturing the mountaintop position at Phou Seu. Then, two regiments of guerrillas would be landed in the vacuum behind the front lines thus caused by the PAVN's forward movement. Phase two would follow on with two road interdictions planned to starve out the PAVN, followed by establishment of an interlocking network of artillery fire bases after the Communists withdrew. Not figured in the Royalist calculations was the determination of PAVN General Vũ Lập to alter Communist policy and maintain PAVN's positions on the Plain through the rainy season monsoon.

== August–September 1972 operations ==
Vang Pao jumped the gun to begin his operation in early August. He organized his attacking troops into five separate task forces. He struggled to coordinate the start of the task force assaults over the first three weeks in August. By the time Phou Phiang II was a week old, PAVN reactions were not following the Royalist planners' expectations. The offensive was in trouble.

With his assault schedule thrown out of whack by the PAVN, and his troops consequently in trouble, Vang Pao went looking for help. On 1 September, he made an emergency flight to Vientiane for a tense meeting with Ambassador G. McMurtrie Godley at the airfield. Hoping to cadge more air support, the general blamed a shortage of tactical air for the offensive's lack of success. From Godley's standpoint, the Hmong unit commanders left much to be desired for combat leadership of a force crippled by trench foot. The ambassador made it clear that U.S. tactical air support was limited to 18 daily sorties. He then asked if Vang Pao would continue the offensive on those terms. At this, Vang Pao returned to battle, knowing that saving Long Tieng was essential for the Royalists.

On 19 September, the CIA station in Vientiane reported to Headquarters in the U.S. that the PAVN were successfully adapting the Hmong guerrilla small unit tactics of harassing opposing troop concentrations. They were trying "not only to blunt Vang Pao's offensive, but to wipe him out...."

=== Task Force Alpha ===
Task Force Alpha was formed from Groupement Mobile 31 (GM 31) and two available Thai mercenary battalions, Bataillon Commando 607A (BC 607A) and Bataillon Commando 609A (BC 609A). It consisted of 3,700 troops. They were launched at Communist strongholds at Ban Hintang and Phou Phasai. By 6 August 1972, the Royalist attacks had been repulsed, and the attack turned into a defense of the positions already held by Alpha.

On 18 August, Task Force Alpha renewed its offensive moves. Other than securing some high ground near Hill 1800, it had no success during its week's operations.

On 5 September, Task Force Alpha was weakened to impotence when GM 31 was withdrawn to Savannakhet for refurbishing.

=== Task Force Bravo ===
Task Force Bravo consisted of Groupement Mobile 22 (GM 22), numbering 1,200 men. Its CIA adviser was James Parker, call sign Mule. On 11 August, they were helilifted to Than Heup. They moved east to their objective, occupying it on 15 August. That same day, the 7th and 8th Battalions of the PAVN 866th Regiment moved in to block further Royalist advance, sparking a fortnight of fighting.

When the PAVN battalions shifted to strike Task Force Delta, GM 22 occupied more of the Plain of Jars. On 1 September, the Thai Battalion Commando 619A (BC 619A) was helicoptered in to occupy the mountaintop of Phou Then within the new GM 22 area of operations. When the 335th Regiment turned from its victory over Task Force Delta to attack Task Force Bravo, clearing weather allowed tactical air strikes to help defeat the assault. On 11 September, the task force was reinforced by a pair of 105 mm howitzers and GM 30—imported from Military Region 3 (MR 3).

At 0720 hours on 26 September, PAVN artillery and infantry struck, destroying one of the howitzers. By noon, the guerrilla regiments were withdrawing westward with the Thais in trail. A hastily regrouped GM 21 was helilifted in three kilometers south of GMs 22 and 30 on the 27th to back up Bravo.

=== Task Force Charlie ===
On 13 August, Task Force Charlie was helilifted to a soggy landing zone in a tight little valley southeast of the Plain. Consisting of GM 23's 1,200 soldiers, the task force objective was 11 kilometers west of them, at the Jungle's Mouth. In late August, the 4th Battalion, PAVN 148th Regiment attacked the Royalist regiment. The Royalists withdrew to nearby Khang Kho as September began.

On 12 September, the task force advanced northwards from Khang Kho. Within the week, a three battalion regiment, GM 15, was dispatched as reinforcement. Two of its battalions walked north through rainstorms, headed for Khang Kho. Meanwhile, GM 23 was shifted further north by helicopter. On the 26th, the regimental commander and the unit's CIA adviser were helicoptered into a proposed landing zone for the third battalion. Bataillon Guerrier 103 (BG 103) flew in as proposed. A PAVN artillery barrage landed that evening; another one hit later, at 0200 hours. The weather deteriorated, preventing tactical air support. During a PAVN ground assault that began at 0700 hours 27 September, CIA case officer Raymond Seaborg was killed in a defensive action that won him the CIA's Intelligence Star. With his death, and the wounding of the GM 15 commander, the regiment responded to the loss of leadership by dispersing into the countryside.

=== Task Force Echo ===
On 15 August, GM 24 became the initial regiment posted to Task Force Echo. On the 16th, accompanied by CIA case officer George Bacon, they aimed south at Nong Pet. On 18 August, troops from GM 27 moved out to join them, making 2,200 troops assigned to Echo.

By 1 September, the task force was within two kilometers of its assigned interdiction point on Communist supply Route 71. By the 4th, it was retreating from PAVN opposition. A renewed attempt was made on the road on 9 September. An off-target air strike by the RLAF hit the friendly forces, killing 37 and wounding 43. On the 16th, another accidental RLAF bombing killed 27 soldiers from GM 24. The regiment was withdrawn for refitting, leaving only GM 27 in Task Force Echo.

=== Task Force Delta ===
By now, it was apparent that the PAVN were in no hurry to obligingly push southwestward of the Plain and leave the planned-upon vacuum behind them. Nevertheless, Commando Raiders were parachuted in on Moung Kheun between 0030 and 0100 hours 21 August 1972 to prepare the way for Task Force Delta. Dawn saw the arrival of the first GM 21 troops from Bouamlong via CH-53s of the 21st Special Operation Squadron; by afternoon, the entire regiment had been airlifted in. Foul weather blocked the arrival of GM 26 until 24 August. Its arrival drove the total of troops on hand to 2,400 soldiers.

Both regiments of Task Force Delta moved south towards their objectives. They were covered by 12 U.S. Air Force tactical air sorties per day allotted strictly to them. They could also call on the air power designated for the entire operation as well. However, they also suffered some disadvantages. The CIA advisers faced unexpected problems from a largely adolescent soldiery.

Due to the drying Hmong manpower pool, GM 26 contained more than 100 troopers under the age of 17. As the adviser to GM 21 noted, "We had 14-year-olds fighting, and the troops were getting lazy, leaving behind lots of equipment in the field...." The CIA case officer for GM 26 saw paradrops called in just so his soldiers could line their foxholes with the parachutes. The young soldiers would switch weapons assignments out of boredom. They ran down the batteries of their tactical radios lighting cigarettes from the power terminals. And the case officer found it necessary to assign about a dozen pre-teen soldiers to communications and logistics duties to spare them from combat.

On 26 August, the 1st Battalion of the PAVN 335th Independent Regiment moved west to contact GM 21 of Task Force Delta. By the 30th, the 2nd and 4th Battalions had joined it. The 7th and 8th Battalions of the PAVN 866th Regiment moved to support the attack. Four Type 59 tanks and PAVN artillery also fired support. Over the next two days, Task Force Delta took a pounding before it fell apart. A withdrawal across the flooding Nam Ngum (Ngum River) drowned many Hmong soldiers. Many others went missing. A B-52 friendly fire incident killed several GM 26 troopers, including their Forward Air Guide (FAG).

By 3 September 1972, U.S. tactical air power could not strike in support of Task Force Delta as it no longer had friendly defenses to support. Delta was in full flight. To add to the Royalist soldiers' woes, about 600 of them developed trench foot after a week without removing footwear. Among their other woes, they had to revert to going bare foot. Task Force Delta was finished as a fighting entity.

== October–November 1972 operations ==
A successful first phase had not been included in planning as a prerequisite for the second phase of Phou Phiang II. However, the 1 October announcement of the start of phase two shocked Washington. On 6 October, Vientiane cabled Washington the plans to interdict supply routes running from Vietnam to the Plain of Jars. A reply confirming ongoing U.S. Air Force air support was taken for approval for phase two.

The air support supplied for phase two would include a new weapons system. Operation Sentinel Lock was a combined photo-mapping and navigational emplacement program to enable radar-directed interdiction bombing by F-111s of the 474th Tactical Fighter Wing based in Thailand and B-52s, using a ground-based beacon for targeting guidance. The beacon bombing efforts began supporting Operation Phou Phiang II on 11 November 1972, with the radar guided bombing being especially valuable during foul weather.

=== Task Force Bravo ===
The task force's two regiments moved on different objectives. GM 21 moved on Ban Na. GM 22 moved northwest of Phou Seu. Neither unit made much progress against the PAVN foe before the operation ended.

=== Task Force Charlie ===
GM 23 reversed its retreat and headed back northward almost to the village of Lat Sen, with GM 15 trailing it. To aid this, on 1 October the remnants of Task Force Delta, a regrouped GM 26, was lifted to Khang Kho. On the 2nd, GM 30 was flown in as reinforcements.

On 9 October, moving under cloud cover that restricted aviation, the PAVN 148th Regiment struck. When the GM 23 commander was medevaced, his regiment withdrew southwards. GM 30 followed it. On the 10th, GM 15 led a counterattack by the task force to the verge of Lat Sen. PAVN tanks attacked through Lat Sen just before midnight on 12 October. GM 15 withdrew to Ban Pa Dong. The rest of the task fell back to regroup near Khang Kho.

On the 16th, Task Force Charlie tried another advance. Led by two Thai battalions flown in for the occasion, the task force reached Lat Sen on 20 October 1972. GM 30 sheered off from the Royalist column to the bottom of Phou Seu.

Between 22 and 25 October, the task force was reinforced by a fresh regiment of 1,460 men imported to Lat Sen from Military Region 3, GM 32. At 1800 hours 25 October, two Royalist companies were forwarded to occupy a mountaintop position atop Phou Theung. They reported reaching the base of the mountain at 2100 hours without encountering resistance. An hour later, PAVN tanks were reported moving southwards on Phou Theung. Radio contact with the companies was lost 15 minutes later, at 2215 hours. The Royalists made an emergency call for gunship support, with no luck. At 2230 hours, Communist 130mm field gun shells began to land on GM 32. Over the next five hours, all but one 75mm recoilless rifle in the heavy weapons company were destroyed in the ongoing bombardment. Then GM 32 was attacked by the PAVN 924th Battalion of the 866th Regiment, backed by tanks and armored cars. The armored force overran GM 32 in the predawn hours. The Royalists were in full retreat by 0530 hours on 26 October. When it regrouped on 31 October, GM 32 had suffered 140 dead, 190 wounded, and 53 missing.

Elsewhere, Task Force Charlie also took a beating. The two Thai battalions that had spearheaded the Lat Sen drive were decimated by enemy action, with one battalion commander killed in action. The two battalions retreated once again to Khang Kho. GM 30 was also struck at Phou Seu. It was weakened by desertions as it drew back to Ban Pa Dong. The regiment began leaving the front on 1 November to be returned to MR 3.

That same day, GM 15 was ordered to advance from Khang Kho; they were supported by a Thai mercenary battalion. On 2 November, they were struck by the earliest ever start for a PAVN dry season offensive. As Task Force Charlie was shoved back to Ban Pa Dong and Khang Kho, GM 32 took an additional 80 killed and 85 wounded. Thus rendered no longer fit for combat, they were returned to MR 3. GM 15 clung to Khang Kho for a bit, but withdrew by 14 November. On 26 November, they were returned to Military Region 1. Task Force Charlie was finished.

=== Task Force Echo ===
GM 27 managed to get close enough to the Communist Route 71 to harry their supply efforts. The PAVN brought in two fresh regiments of reinforcements to oppose them. In turn, the Royalists returned GM 24 to the task force. The result was a standoff northeast of the Plain.

=== Task Force Foxtrot ===
In mid-October, GM 28 graduated from training and became an unplanned addition to the Royalist movements, dubbed Task Force Foxtrot. They were flown into Bouamlong, an outpost on the northern Plain. From there they were slated to move east to conduct guerrilla operations in the rear of enemy forces in the Ban Ban Valley, near the Vietnamese border.

By 30 October, GM 28 had reached the northern head of the Ban Ban Valley. There they were opposed and halted by the PAVN's 5th Battalion, 88th Regiment. GM 28 stalled there until withdrawn to Bouamlong to end Operation Phou Phiang II.

=== Operation Tulah ===
In mid-October, the Royal Lao Army's 12th Brigade and 13th Brigades were helilifted into Operation Tulah (Operation October). The six battalions were moved from Vang Vieng onto the Plain of Jars. They were landed at two helicopter landing zones 13 kilometers southwest of the Communist-held forward fighter base at Muang Soui. One Royalist column moved toward Xieng Dat. A second column slowly patrolled back westwards along Route 7; they were headed for the Royalist-held intersection of Routes 7 and 13 at Sala Phou Khoun. Operation Tulah ended on 25 October, after the Royalist regulars were unable to dislodge the Pathet Lao Hmong Communists from Xieng Dat.

== Results ==
Overall, the guerrillas' need for staff coordination of their movements became apparent as a result of this operation as early as 16 September. As it worked out, Communist forces defeated the Royalists in detail.

Task Force Alpha's offensive was stalled by PAVN resistance by 25 August. One of its regiments was subsequently withdrawn for refitting. Basically, the task force never got away from its start point.

Task Force Bravo's three regiments were defeated and in retrograde mode by 26 September. They had to be stabilized by hasty commitment of a regrouped and previously defeated regiment. Task force regiments later were thwarted in capturing two objectives from the PAVN.

In Task Force Charlie, GM 15 scattered while under attack when their CIA adviser was killed on 27 September. Despite this setback, the task force assaulted the PAVN in and around Lat Sen three times during October. As this task force was the only one enjoying any success, its operation was stoked with reinforcements from the reserves and from stalemated columns. GM 32 took 220 dead, 270 wounded, and at least 53 missing; it was left unfit for further combat and withdrawn from the operation. Two Thai battalions were also decimated. GM 30 was defeated and sapped by desertions. GM 15 went on one last offensive, only to plow head-on into the earliest PAVN dry season offensive of the war.

Task Force Delta was plagued by underage, sloppy soldiers. Once five PAVN battalions coalesced upon it, it was defeated by tanks and artillery fire. Of the Task Force Delta regiments, GM 26 mustered at 40% strength when it regrouped back at Long Tieng. Its executive officer and a battalion commander had been killed. GM 21 regrouped independently, in the vicinity of Ban Na. With the task force suffering over 600 cases of trench foot in addition to other casualties, it was finished as a fighting force by 3 September.

Task Force Echo was struck heavily by "friendly" air strikes on both 9 and 16 September, suffering 64 killed and at least 43 wounded. The accidental bombings caused the temporary withdrawal of GM 24. However, whether staffed with one regiment or two, Task Force Echo was stopped by the PAVN after minor harassment of Communist supply Route 71.

As a late and unplanned addition to the operation, Task Force Foxtrot was expected to rampage through the PAVN rear areas north of Ban Ban after it was committed in mid-October. However, a PAVN blocking force stalemated it.

Operation Tulah achieved no perceptible results.

== Aftermath ==
In late October, ceasefire negotiations began for settling the Laotian Civil War as well as the Vietnam War.

In late November, four fresh Thai battalions landed at Long Tieng. Four tired ones rotated out. On 6 December, some of the new arrivals were lifted by Air America into the Nam Bleung Valley to attack a numerically inferior garrison of PAVN troops. They were also directed at Phou Phasai, attacking from both southeast and southwest while backed by GM 21 and GM 26. In this case, the attackers also outnumbered the defenders. In all cases, the Royalist attacks failed.

A peace settlement would freeze the opposing forces in place. The PAVN would be left with positions in uneasy proximity with the Royalist guerrillas at Long Tieng. This would lead to Vang Pao's next move.
