= 428th Fighter Squadron =

Active US Air Force unit

428th Fighter Squadron

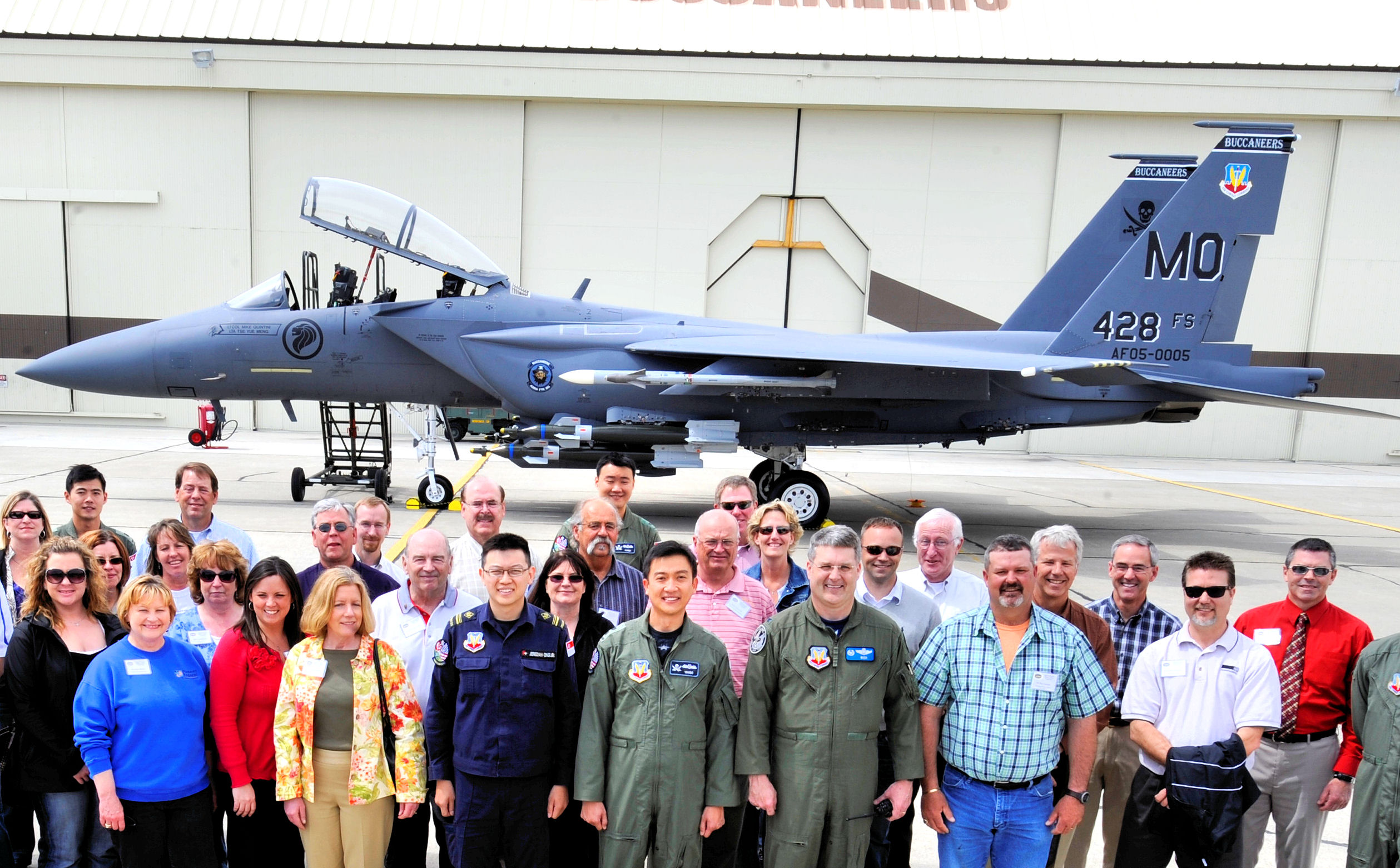
- F-15SG Strike Eagle
- Active: 1943–1945; 1952–1989; 1990–1995; 1998–2005; 2009–present
- Country: United States
- Branch: United States Air Force
- Role: Fighter
- Part of: Air Combat Command
- Garrison/HQ: Mountain Home Air Force Base
- Engagements: European Theater of Operations; Korean War; Vietnam War
- Decorations: Distinguished Unit Citation; Air Force Outstanding Unit Award with Combat "V" Device; Air Force Outstanding Unit Award; Belgian Fourragère; Korean Presidential Unit Citation; Republic of Vietnam Gallantry Cross with Palm

Insignia
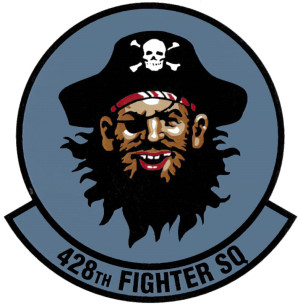
- 428th Fighter Squadron emblem (approved 3 June 1954)

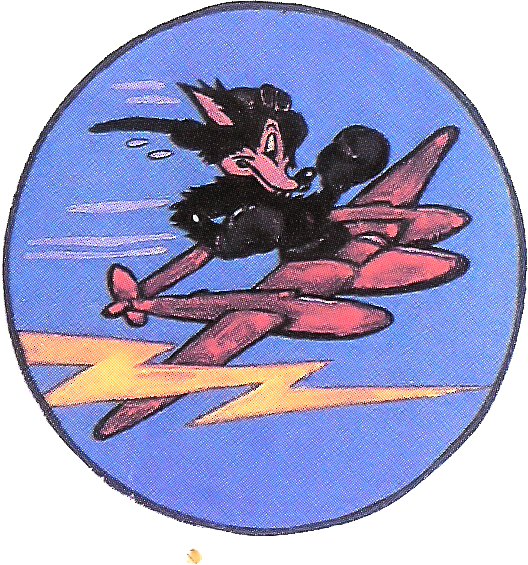
- 428th Fighter Squadron emblem (World War II)

The 428th Fighter Squadron is part of the 366th Fighter Wing at Mountain Home Air Force Base, Idaho. Currently, it operates F-15SG Strike Eagle aircraft conducting formal training missions to qualify Republic of Singapore Air Force crew in the F-15SG in a program titled Peace Carvin V.

The squadron was first activated during World War II and served in the European Theater of Operations under the 474th Fighter Group, where it earned the Distinguished Unit Citation. After V-E Day in 1945, the 428th served briefly with the occupation forces in Germany before returning to the United States for inactivation. The squadron was again activated as the 428th Fighter-Bomber Squadron in 1952 to replace an Air National Guard unit serving in the Korean War and earned a second Distinguished Unit Citation in that conflict. Following the truce ending the Korean War, the squadron returned to the United States, frequently deploying to Europe. As the reactivated 428th Tactical Fighter Squadron under the 474th Tactical Fighter Wing, in 1968 it deployed to Thailand to support the Vietnam War and again, in 1973, to Thailand to support combat operations in the Vietnam War. The squadron was inactivated in 1989.

In 1990, the squadron became the 428th Tactical Fighter Training Squadron and has trained crews from 1990 to 1995, 1998 to 2005, and again since 2009.

== Mission ==
The squadron's mission is to provide advanced weapons and tactics continuation training for Republic of Singapore Air Force F-15 pilots, weapon systems officers and maintenance personnel. RSAF aircrew and maintenance personnel are assigned to the 428th for three years, during which they receive advanced tactics training, shoot live missiles at Combat Archer, and deploy to locations throughout the United States to participate in composite operations and dissimilar air combat exercises.

== History ==
=== World War II ===
The 428th Fighter Squadron was activated on 1 August 1943 as a Lockheed P-38 Lightning fighter squadron under IV Fighter Command in Southern California as part of the 474th Fighter Group. It trained with the P-38 over the Mojave Desert, moving to the European Theater of Operations, and was assigned to Ninth Air Force in England during March 1944. It operated out of Warmwell, Britain, and Saint Lambert, St. Marceau, and Peronne, France, Florennes, Belgium, and Strassfeld, Langensalza, Schweinfurt, and Stuttgart, Germany during and immediately after the war in 1945. Squadron markings on the vertical tail surfaces were a black triangle and "F5" with call sign "Geyser". It provided bomber escort but the primary role was as an attack and interdiction fighter. It flew its first combat missions on 25 April 1944. As part of the 474th Fighter Group, they attacked bridges and railroads in France in preparation for the Normandy invasion, provided air cover for the invasion force, and flew bombing missions to support the landings. Subsequently it conducted armed reconnaissance missions after D-Day and attacked highways and troops to support the Allied breakthrough at St Lo. The Squadron supported the British attack on Holland in Sep 1944; the Battle of the Bulge Dec 1944-Jan 1945; and the airborne assault across the Rhine in Mar 1945. As part of the 474th, it was awarded the Distinguished Unit Citation for a mission on 23 August 1944 and twice the Order of the Day, Belgian Army. Personnel were demobilized in Europe during 1945, returned to the United States in November as an administrative unit and was inactivated on 7 December 1945 without personnel or equipment.

=== Cold War ===
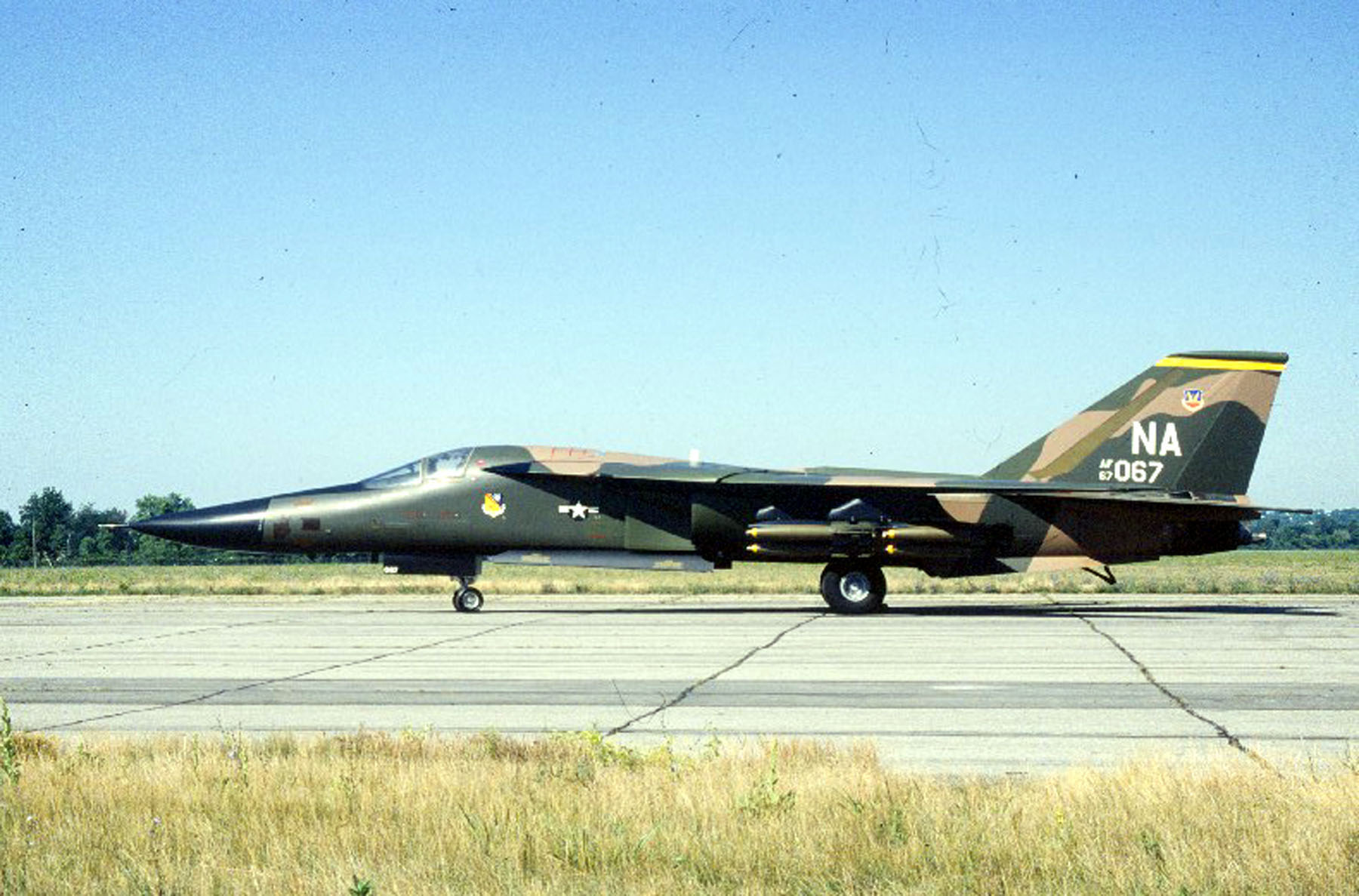
General Dynamics F-111A (S/N 67-067) on display at the "National Museum of the USAF" at Wright-Patterson Air Force Base, Ohio (USA). The F-111A is painted with the markings of the 428th Tactical Fighter Squadron, 474th Tactical Fighter Wing.

Reactivated in Japan under Far East Air Forces, July 1952 as a result of the Korean War. Replaced Federalized Georgia Air National Guard personnel, receiving their Republic F-84G Thunderjets. Moved to South Korea in August as part of the 474th Fighter Bomber Wing and, later, the 474th Fighter Bomber Group engaging in combat operations from Kunsan Air Base (K-8). From Kunsan the squadron bombed and strafed bridges, bunkers, troop concentrations, artillery positions, and a host of other enemy targets. Moved to Taegu Air Base (K-2) in April 1953 being attached to the 58th Fighter-Bomber Wing. Flew interdiction and close air support missions in as well as attacking special strategic targets such as military schools, dams, and port facilities in North Korea until the June 1953 Armistice, Remained in South Korea for over a year afterward to insure Communist compliance with the cease-fire.

Returned to Clovis Air Force Base, New Mexico in November 1954. The Squadron was re-equipped with North American F-86H Sabre fighter-bomber aircraft, being assigned to Twelfth Air Force, Tactical Air Command. It maintained proficiency in tactical fighter operations, deploying components, aircraft, and crews on a global basis in support of NATO, PACAF, AAC, and other organizations. Deployed to southeastern United States during the Cuban Missile Crisis of 1962.

The Squadron moved to Nellis Air Force Base, Nevada in 1966 to be part of the 474th Tactical Fighter Wing (TFW). The 474th (Roadrunners) became the first USAF operational wing equipped with the General Dynamics F-111. On 20 January 1968 the 474th Tactical Fighter Wing was activated at Nellis Air Force Base, Nevada from the 4480th TFW, giving the base an operational tactical fighter wing assigned to Twelfth Air Force.

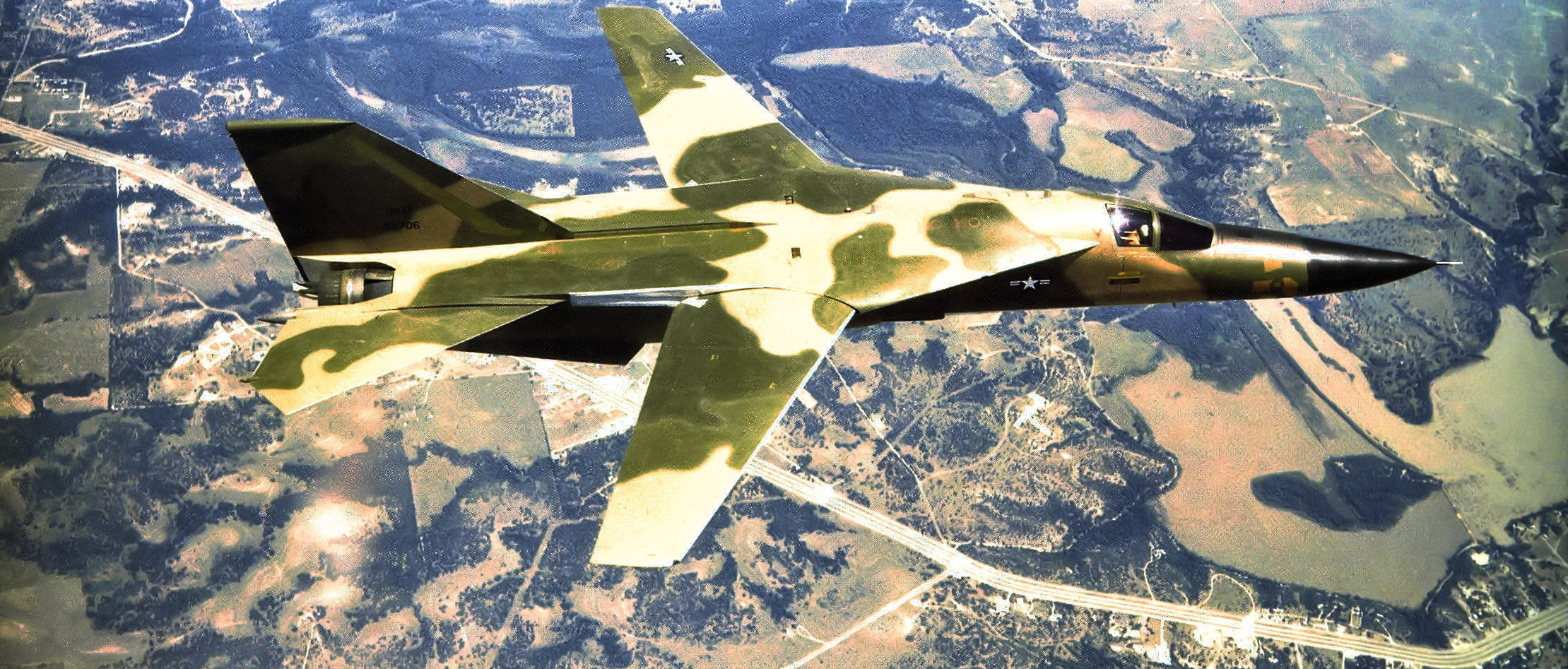
428th TFS Combat Lancer F-111A over Southeast Asia 1968

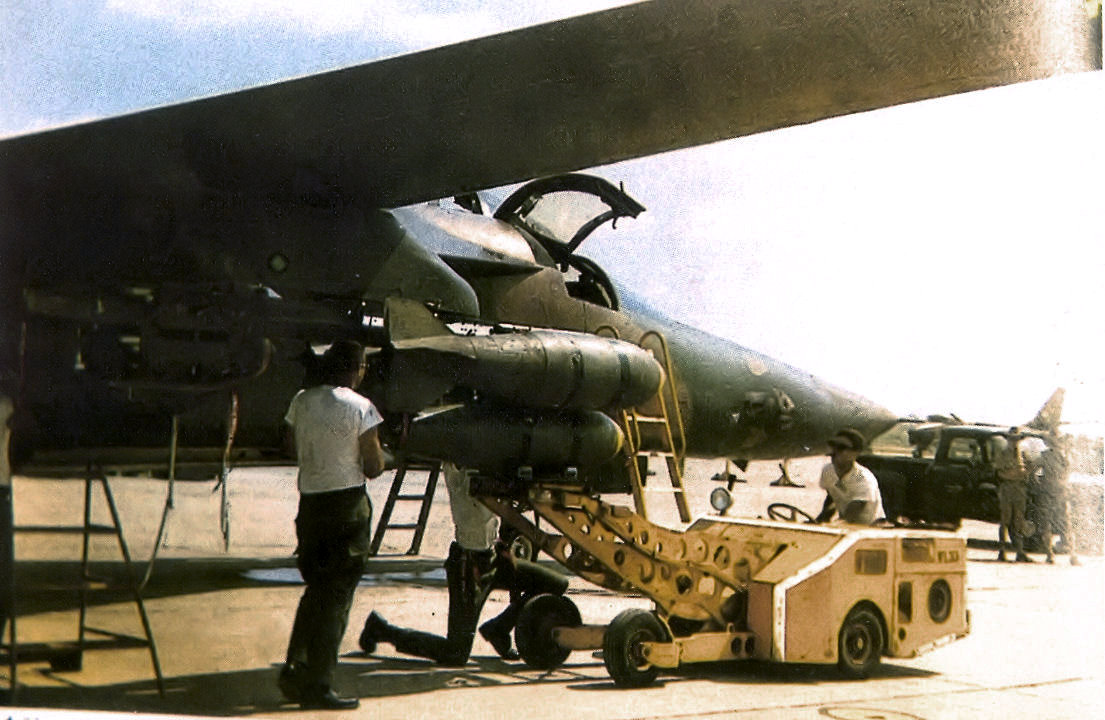
428th TFS Combat Lancer F-111A being loaded with bombs March 1968

In early 1968, the Air Force decided to send a small detachment of F-111As to Southeast Asia under the "Combat Lancer" program. Six 428th TFS Harvest Reaper F-111As were allocated to Combat Lancer under "Detachment 1" under the command of Colonel Ivan H. Dethman, and they departed Nellis for Takhli Royal Thai Air Force Base on 15 March 1968. The six F-111s, accompanied by KC-135 tankers, departed for Andersen Air Force Base, Guam. The over 13-hour trip was flown using the F-111's inertial navigation system and with topoff refueling from the tankers, arriving at Andersen AFB on the 16th. The Detachment departed Andersen and arrived at Takhli on 17 March. The Detachment was attached to the F-105 Thunderchief-flying 355th Tactical Fighter Wing in what was officially seen as the first stage in replacement of the Wing's F-105s with the F-111A. F-111 combat operations began on 25 March using the aircraft's unique terrain following radar (TFR) capability to conduct surprise night deep interdiction strikes. By the end of the deployment, 55 night low-level missions had been flown against targets in North Vietnam, but three aircraft had been lost. Aircraft 66022, call sign Omaha 77, was lost on 28 March with the loss of the crew, Colonel Hank McCann and Captain Dennis Graham. On 30 March, the crew of Major Sandy Marquardt and Captain Joe Hodges in aircraft 66017, Hotrod 73, successfully ejected and was recovered uninjured in Thailand. Replacement aircraft had left Nellis, but a third loss halted F-111A combat operations. On 22 April, Tailbone 78, aircraft 66024, crewed by Lieutenant Commander Spade Cooley and by Lieutenant Colonel Ed Palmgren, was lost. After the 3rd loss, the Detachment remained poised for combat, but they saw no combat action before their return to the U.S. on 22 November. The Detachment and remaining aircraft returned to Nellis and development of the F-111 continued, with the 474th finally reaching operational status in 1971.

In March 1973 it was reassigned to the 347th Fighter Wing and deployed back to Takhli, this time being placed on permanent party status in Thailand, taking over the aircraft the 430th TFS had left upon its return to the United States. For a brief period the 347th flew combat operations into Cambodia until 15 August, when the last wartime mission of the Vietnam era was flown over Cambodia. The wing was maintained in a combat-ready status for possible contingency.

After the end of combat missions in Indochina, the squadron moved to Korat Royal Thai Air Force Base, Thailand on 12 July 1974 after the closure of Taklhi and remained in Southeast Asia through May 1975 to undertake strike missions in the event of further contingency operations. Participated in numerous exercises and firepower demonstrations, and, during Jan–May 1975, flew sea surveillance missions. Participated in the Mayaguez Incident against Cambodian Khmer Rouge forces in May 1975, including the sinking of a Cambodian patrol boat.

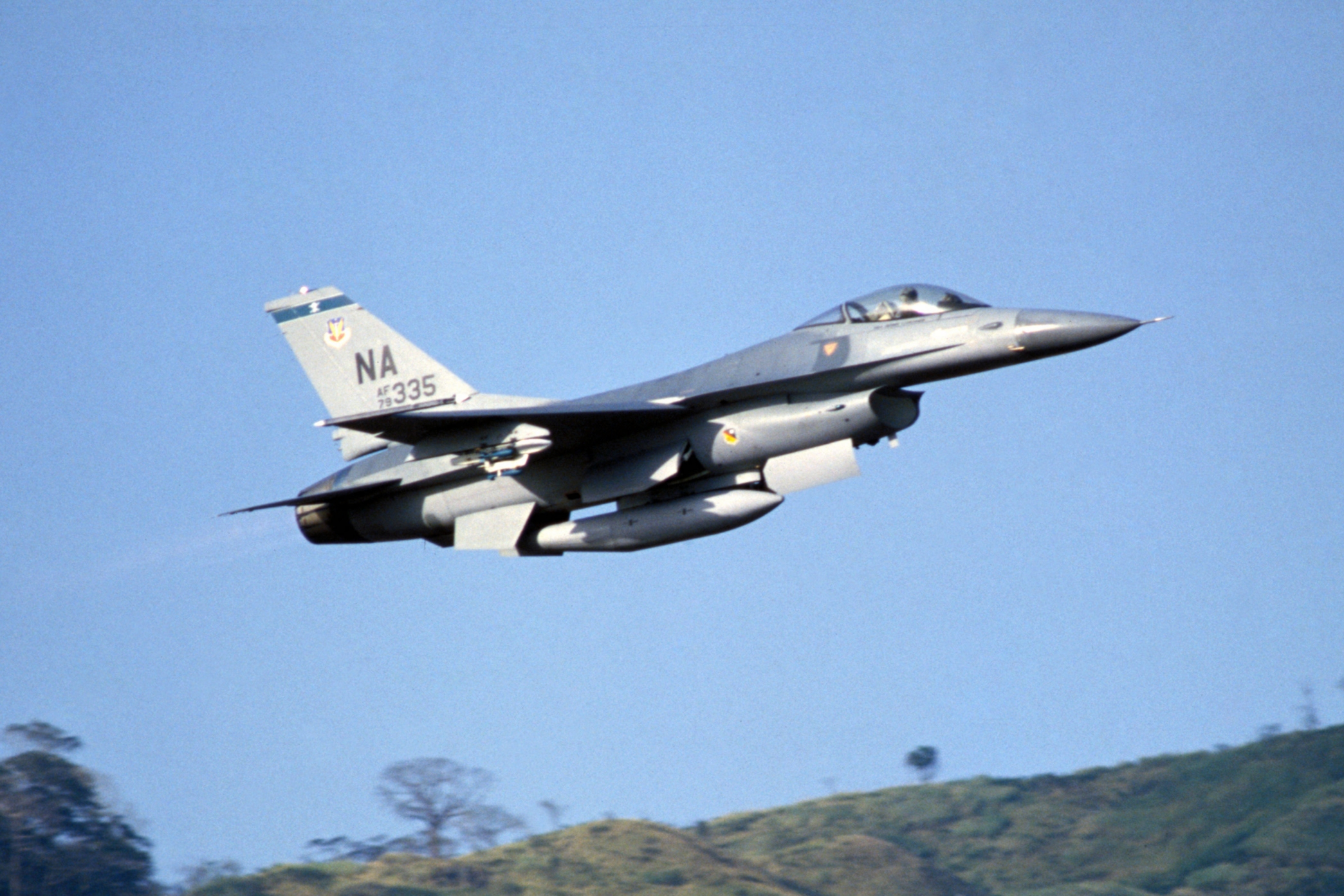
A 428th F-16A Block 10 (s/n 79-0335) in Panama, 1986.

Upon return to the United States on 30 June 1975, reassigned back to the 474th Wing, sending F-111s to 366th Tactical Fighter Wing at Mountain Home Air Force Base, Idaho and changing equipment to the McDonnell F-4D Phantom II during "Operation Ready Switch". Received new Block 1/5 General Dynamics F-16A Fighting Falcon aircraft in November 1980 after protracted development period in the 1970s. Conducted routine Tactical Air Command training and deployments from Nellis with the F-16s, upgrading to Block 10/15 models in the early 1980s. Inactivated September 1989 when aircraft were considered no longer front-line combat capable.

=== Post Cold War era ===
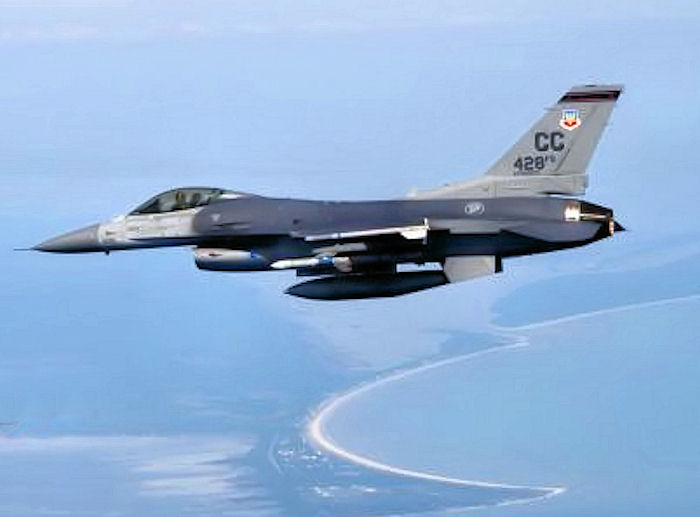
428th FS F-16C Block 52 94-270

Reactivated at Cannon Air Force Base, New Mexico on 2 April 1990 as an F-111G Formal Training Unit squadron for the 27th Tactical Fighter Wing. Reassigned to the 27th Operations Group in 1991 when the wing implemented the USAF Objective Wing organization. Received F-111Es in June 1992 as a result of the retirement of the F-111s from United States Air Forces Europe, the aircraft being transferred to Cannon from RAF Upper Heyford, England, upgrading the 27th Fighter Wing. Inactivated in October 1995 as part of the phaseout of the F-111 from the USAF inventory.

Reactivated in September 1998 as an F-16C/D training squadron for the Peace Carvin III initiative. When reactivated the 428th was a hybrid US Air Force/Republic of Singapore Air Force (RSAF) F-16 Fighter Squadron manned by highly experienced USAF instructor pilots, maintenance and support personnel. The squadron operated 12 RSAF-owned Block 52, F-16C/Ds. With approximately 25 USAF personnel and 140 RSAF personnel, the unit was responsible for continuation training of Singapore personnel in rapid deployment and tactical employment of the F-16 throughout a wide spectrum of missions including air-to-air, joint maritime and precision air-to-ground weapons delivery. Inactivated on 5 July 2005 with the phaseout of the F-16 at Cannon, and the base being transferred to Air Force Special Operations Command.

Reactivated in May 2009 at Mountain Home Air Force Base, Idaho as a F-15SG Strike Eagle fighter training squadron, part of the Peace Carvin V program for the RSAF.

The squadron, previous commanded at reactivation 2009 by Keith Gibson, LTC, USAF, is commanded by Lt Col Nathaniel Bell, USAF with Lt. Col Sivaraj Arumugam, RSAF as senior ranking officer.

== Lineage ==
- Constituted as the 428th Fighter Squadron on 26 May 1943

Activated on 1 August 1943
Inactivated on 7 December 1945

- Redesignated 428th Fighter-Bomber Squadron on 25 June 1952

Activated on 10 July 1952
Redesignated 428th Tactical Fighter Squadron on 1 July 1958
Inactivated on 15 November 1966
Activated on 15 September 1968
Inactivated on 30 June 1989

- Redesignated 428th Tactical Fighter Training Squadron on 20 March 1990

Activated on 2 April 1990
Redesignated 428th Fighter Squadron on 1 November 1991
Inactivated on 12 October 1995

- Activated on 15 September 1998

Inactivated on 5 July 2005

- Activated on 18 May 2009

=== Assignments ===
- 474th Fighter Group, 1 August 1943 – 7 December 1945
- 474th Fighter-Bomber Group, 10 July 1952 (attached to 58th Fighter-Bomber Wing 1 April 1953 – 22 November 1954)
- 474th Fighter-Bomber Wing (later Tactical Fighter Wing), 8 October 1957
- 347th Tactical Fighter Wing, 30 July 1973
- 474th Tactical Fighter Wing, 21 June 1975 – 30 June 1989
- 27th Tactical Fighter Wing (later 27th Fighter Wing, later 27th Special Operations Wing), 2 April 1990
- 27th Operations Group (later 27th Special Operations Group), 1 November 1991 – 12 October 1995
- 27th Operations Group, 15 September 1998 – 5 July 2005
- 366th Operations Group, 18 May 2009 – present

=== Operational Components ===
- Detachment 1: 20 January 1968 – 1 January 1969 (detached and deployed at Takhli Royal Thai Air Force Base, Thailand, 17 March-c. 21 November 1968)

=== Stations ===
- Grand Central Airport, California, 1 August 1943
- Van Nuys Airport, California, 11 October 1943
- Oxnard Flight Strip, California, 5 January – 6 February 1944
- RAF Warmwell (AAF-454), England, 12 March 1944
- Saint-Lambert Airfield (A-11), France, 6 August 1944
- Saint Marceau Airfield (A-43), France, 29 August 1944
- Peronne Airfield (A-72), France, 6 September 1944
- Florennes/Juzaine Airfield (A-78), Belgium, 1 October 1944
- Strassfeld Airfield (Y-59), Germany, 22 March 1945
- Langansalza Airfield (R-2), Germany, 22 April 1945
- AAF Station Schweinfurt, Germany, 16 June 1945
- AAF Station Stuttgart/Echterdingen, Germany, 25 October – 21 November 1945
- Camp Kilmer, New Jersey, 6–8 December 1945
- Misawa Air Base, Japan, 10 July 1952
- Kunsan Air Base (K-8), South Korea, 10 July 1952
- Taegu Air Base (K-2), South Korea, 1 April 1953 – 22 November 1954
- Clovis Air Force Base (later Cannon Air Force Base), New Mexico, 13 December 1954 – 15 November 1966

Deployed to Toul-Rosières Air Base, France (1 April – 28 September 1957)
Deployed to Incirlik Air Base, Turkey (16 February – 19 June 1959)
Deployed to Kung Kuan Air Base, Taiwan (20 May – 13 June 1960)
Deployed to Kadena Air Base, Okinawa (31 May – 23 June 1960)
Deployed to Incirlik Air Base, Turkey (2 October 1961 – 15 February 1962)
Deployed to Incirlik Air Base, Turkey (9 January – 14 April 1963)
Deployed to Aviano Air Base, Italy (12 February – 8 May 1964)
Deployed to Da Nang Air Base, South Vietnam (24 November 1964 – 13 March 1965)

- Nellis Air Force Base, Nevada, 15 September 1968 – 30 July 1973

Deployed to Takhli Royal Thai Air Force Base, Thailand, (8 January – 29 July 1973)

- Takhli Royal Thai Air Force Base, Thailand, 30 July 1973 – 12 July 1974
- Korat Royal Thai Air Force Base, Thailand, 12 July 1974 – 21 June 1975
- Nellis Air Force Base, Nevada, 21 June 1975 – 30 September 1989

Deployed to Ramstein Air Base, Germany, 27 August – 26 September 1987

- Mountain Home Air Force Base, Idaho, 11 September 1992 – 22 June 1993
- Cannon Air Force Base, New Mexico, 2 April 1990 – 12 October 1995, 5 September 1998 – 5 July 2005
- Mountain Home Air Force Base, Idaho, 18 May 2009 – present

=== Aircraft ===
- Lockheed P-38 Lightning, 1943–1945
- Republic F-84 Thunderjet, 1952–1954
- North American F-86 Sabre, 1955–1957
- North American F-100 Super Sabre, 1957–1965
- General Dynamics F-111 Aardvark, 1969–1977, 1990–1995
- McDonnell (later McDonnell Douglas) F-4 Phantom, 1977–1982
- General Dynamics F-16 Fighting Falcon, 1982–1989, 1998–2005
- McDonnell Douglas F-15SG Strike Eagle, 2009 – present

== See also ==
- 425th Fighter Squadron Peace Carvin II
