= 478th Tactical Fighter Squadron =

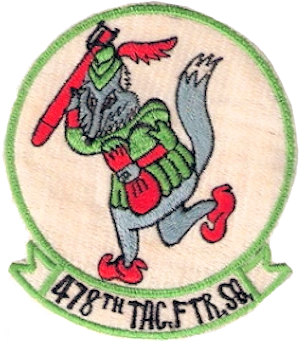
- Emblem of the 478th Tactical Fighter Squadron
- Active: 1957–1970
- Country: United States
- Branch: United States Air Force
- Nickname(s): "Green Foxes"

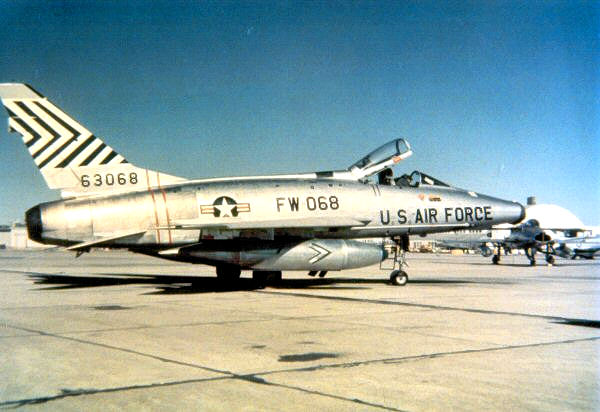
478th TFS F-100D Super Sabre – 56-3068

The 478th Tactical Fighter Squadron is an inactive United States Air Force unit. It was last assigned to the 31st Tactical Fighter Wing and stationed at Homestead AFB, Florida.

== History ==
Activated in October 1957 at Cannon Air Force Base, New Mexico when the 474th Fighter-Bomber Wing replaced the 474th Fighter-Bomber Group and added a fourth squadron. Initially equipped with the North American F-100D Super Sabre. Aircraft initially had green diagonal stripes on tail, later changing to black and white. The squadron received some of the last production batch of the F-100 from North American, the production line closing in December 1957.

Trained for proficiency and operational readiness in the Super Sabre, deploying on Tactical Air Command directed deployments. In 1962, deployed to 6010th Tactical Group at Takhli Royal Thai Air Force Base, Thailand, one of the early expeditionary fighter squadrons of the Vietnam War. Squadron began, phasing down for replacement with the General Dynamics F-111A and a move to Nellis Air Force Base in late 1965.

Instead, the squadron moved to Homestead Air Force Base, Florida as a filler organization for the 4531st Tactical Fighter Wing, as the 31st Tactical Fighter Wing had deployed to South Vietnam. Received McDonnell F-4C Phantom IIs upon assignment, upgrading to F-4Ds in August 1967. Mission at Homestead primarily was to provide air defense of South Florida in wake of Cuban Missile Crisis, operating the Phantom and gaining proficiency in the aircraft. Was upgraded to the F-4E in November 1968.

Provisional wing began rotational temporary duty deployments to Kunsan Air Base, South Korea in June 1969, being attached to the 354th Tactical Fighter Wing, carrying tail code "ZE", with white outlined blue fin cap, containing white arrows. 478th assigned to Kunsan 21 May 1970, reassigned to 54th Tactical Fighter Wing at Kunsan when the 354th returned to Myrtle Beach Air Force Base, South Carolina in June 1970. Remained in South Korea until September 1970, returning to Homestead.

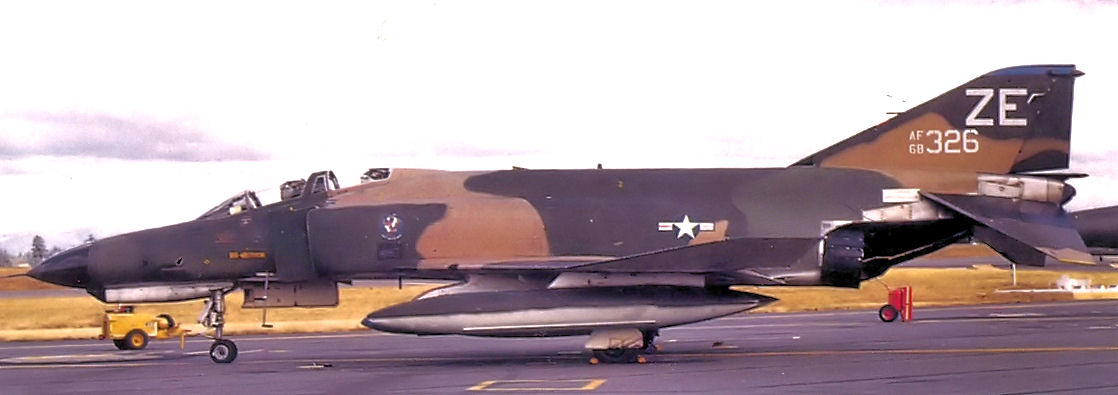
F-4E Phantom II – 68-0326 at Homestead AFB, 1969

The 31st Wing returned from duty at Tuy Hoa Air Base, South Vietnam, October 1970. Squadron replaced by 309th Tactical Fighter Squadron, 31 October 1970 and inactivated.

== Lineage ==
- Constituted as the 478th Fighter-Bomber Squadron on 26 September 1957

Activated on 8 October 1957
Redesignated 478th Tactical Fighter Squadron on 1 July 1958
Inactivated on 31 October 1970

=== Assignments ===
- 474th Fighter-Bomber Wing (later 474th Tactical Fighter Wing), 8 October 1957 – 1 November 1966 (attached to 405th Fighter-Bomber Wing, 23 May – 8 June 1962, not operational after 15 September 1965)
- 4531st Tactical Fighter Wing, 1 November 1966 (attached to 354th Tactical Fighter Wing, 21 May 1970, 54th Tactical Fighter Wing, 15 June-2 September 1970)
- 31st Tactical Fighter Wing, 15–31 October 1970

=== Stations ===
- Cannon Air Force Base, New Mexico, 13 December 1954
- Homestead Air Force Base, Florida, 1 November 1966 – 31 October 1970

=== Aircraft ===
- North American F-100 Super Sabre, 1957–1966
- McDonnell F-4E Phantom II, 1966–1970
