= Operation Linebacker II =

1972 U.S. bombing campaign during the Vietnam War

- Part of the Vietnam War
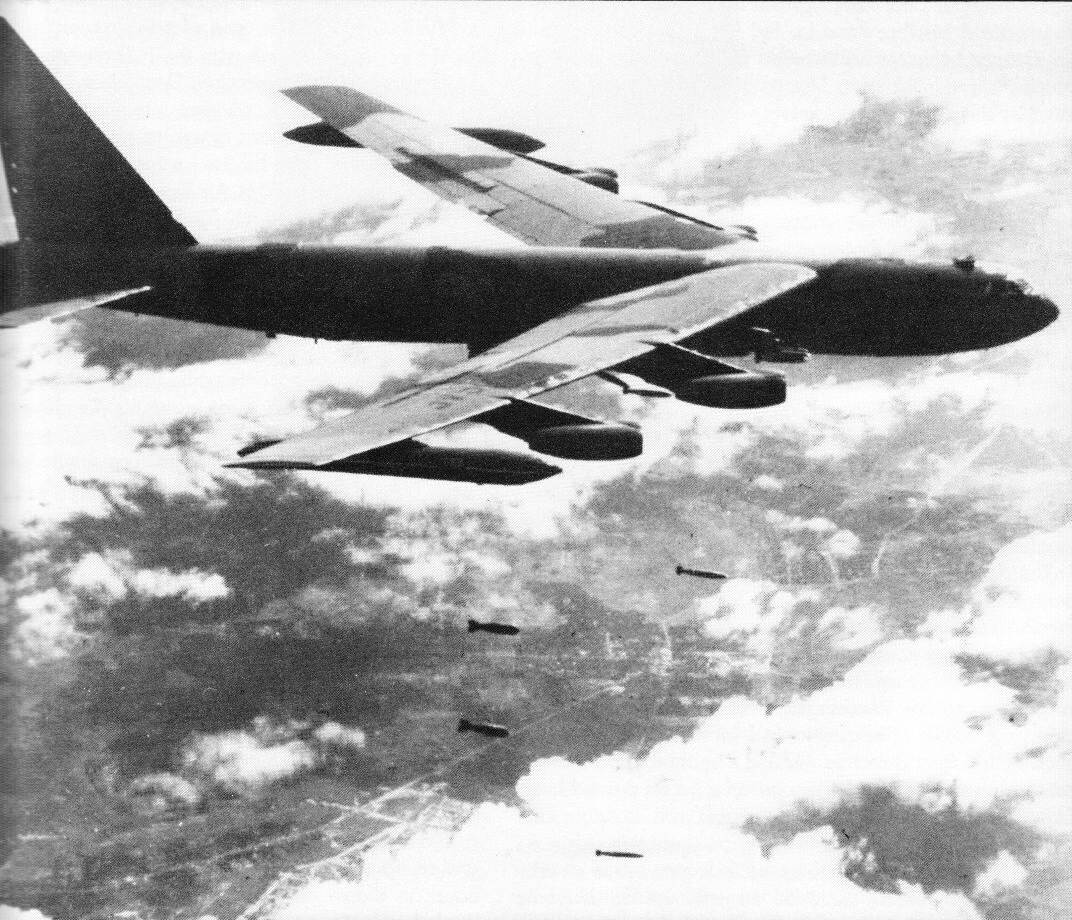
- Boeing B-52 Stratofortress on bomb run
Date	18–29 December 1972
Location	North Vietnam: Hanoi, Haiphong, Thái Nguyên, Lạng Giang, Bắc Giang
Result	Both sides claim victory

Belligerents
United States: United States Air Force; United States Navy; United States Marine Corps	North Vietnam: Air Defence – Air Force Service; Naval Service

Commanders and leaders
John W. Vogt Jr. John C. Meyer; Damon W. Cooper	Lieutenant General Văn Tiến Dũng, Chief of General Staff; Major General Phùng Thế Tài, Deputy Chief of General Staff; Colonel Lê Văn Tri, Commander of the Air Defense – Air Force

Strength
197 to 207 strategic bombers B-52, 14 tactical air groups consisting of 1,077 aircraft of all types from 3 air bases and 6 aircraft carrier	14 SA-2 batteries (266 SA-2 missiles were launched during the operation); 100+ aircraft (including 31 MiG-21s and 16 MiG-17s fighters); AA gun units

Casualties and losses
U.S. claim: 12 tactical aircraft shot down 15 B-52s shot down 4 B-52s suffered heavy damage 5 B-52s suffered medium damage 43 killed in action 49 taken prisoner PAVN claim: 81 aircraft shot down (including 34 B-52s and 5 F-111s; this includes two B-52s shot down by MiG-21 fighters)	U.S. claim: 6 MiG-21s shot down (including 2 MiG-21s shot down by B-52 tail gunners); PAVN claim: 3 MiG-21s shot down 1,624 civilians killed

Operation Linebacker II, sometimes referred to as the Christmas bombing and, in Vietnam, the Twelve days and nights, (Note: Vietnamese: 12 ngày đêm) or Điện Biên Phủ of the Sky, (Note: Vietnamese: Điện Biên Phủ trên không; a reference to the Battle of Dien Bien Phu) was a strategic bombing campaign conducted by the United States against military and industrial areas of North Vietnam from 18 December to 29 December 1972, during the Vietnam War. More than 20,000 tons of ordnance was dropped, primarily targeting Hanoi and Haiphong, and at least 1,624 civilians were killed.

Because of Nixon's diplomatic groundwork, neither Moscow nor Beijing intervened in the campaign. They offered verbal protests but prioritized their new relationships with Washington over their alliance with Hanoi. This isolated North Vietnam and forced them back to the negotiating table within 11 days. Many historians argue that the shifting dynamics of the strategic triangular diplomacy, which led to the Christmas bombing, played a critical role in changing the North Vietnamese's negotiating strategy and ultimately led to the signing of the Paris Peace Accords in January 1973.

By 1972, U.S. combat involvement in Vietnam had been dramatically reduced, and negotiations to end the war were underway in Paris. After secret meetings in October between lead negotiators Henry Kissinger and Le Duc Tho, an informal agreement was reached. The terms included a total U.S. withdrawal, North Vietnam's recognition of South Vietnam, new borders based on the present front lines, and new elections in the South, which would include the then-banned Communist Party of Vietnam. South Vietnamese president Nguyen Van Thieu, however, totally rejected these terms when he was informed about them and, following Richard Nixon's reelection in November, the U.S. submitted new terms, which included the Vietnamese Demilitarized Zone (DMZ) as the recognized national border, leading to a breakdown in negotiations on 16 December. Nixon issued an ultimatum for the North to return to negotiations within 72 hours, after which he ordered the bombing campaign on 18 December. Conducted by more than 200 B-52 bombers from Strategic Air Command supported by tactical planes of the Seventh Air Force and Task Force 77, the raids ran from 18 to 24 December and 26 to 29. The U.S. acknowledged the loss of 16 B-52 bombers, while North Vietnam claimed 34 bombers shot down.

The effect of the bombing on the peace negotiations is debated. On 22 December, Nixon asked the North to return to the talks with the terms offered in October and warned Thieu that he would sign the agreement even if Thieu did not. The North agreed, and Nixon ordered a halt to the bombing on 30 December. The North Vietnamese delegation stated that the campaign played no role in the decision to return to negotiations, while an aide to Kissinger remarked that "[w]e bombed the North Vietnamese into accepting our concessions". On 27 January 1973, the Paris Peace Accords were signed along the same terms as the initial October agreement.

== Background ==
=== "Peace is at hand" ===
On 8 October 1972, U.S. National Security Advisor Henry Kissinger and North Vietnamese Politburo member Le Duc Tho met in Paris to discuss new proposals by both nations, hoping to reach mutually agreeable terms for a peace settlement for the nearly decade-old Vietnam War. Tho presented a new North Vietnamese plan which included proposals for a cease-fire, the withdrawal of American forces, and an exchange of prisoners of war. All three Vietnamese combatant governments—North Vietnam, the Republic of Vietnam (South Vietnam), and the Provisional Revolutionary Government of South Vietnam (PRG)—would remain intact, as would their separate armies. Hanoi no longer demanded that South Vietnamese president Nguyen Van Thieu be removed from office, the U.S. did not have to cease its aid to the southern government, and both Washington and Hanoi could continue to resupply their allies or forces on a parity basis. No new North Vietnamese forces were to be infiltrated from the north, and the U.S. agreed to extend post-war reconstruction assistance to North Vietnam.

The new terms on the table also included the establishment of a National Council of National Reconciliation and Concord, a loosely defined administrative structure which was to work toward general and local elections within South Vietnam. Political power would be shared by three groups: the Saigon government, the PRG, and a "third force" group to be mutually agreed upon by the other two parties. Since it was to work by consensus, nothing could be accomplished by the new council without the agreement of President Thieu.

When the two sides convened again on 17 October, there were two main areas of disagreement: the periodic replacement of South Vietnam's American weaponry and the release of political prisoners held by the Saigon government. The North Vietnamese had made significant modifications to their past negotiating position and were hurrying to get the agreement signed before November, believing that President Richard Nixon would be more willing to make concessions before, rather than after, the upcoming presidential election. Although there were still some issues to be finalized, Kissinger was generally satisfied with the new terms and so notified Nixon, who gave his approval to the settlement.

Kissinger then flew on to Saigon on the 18th to discuss the terms with Thieu. The South Vietnamese president was not happy with either the new agreement or with Kissinger, who he felt had betrayed him. Although Kissinger knew Thieu's negotiating position, he had not informed him of the changes made in Paris nor had his approval been sought. Kissinger "had negotiated on behalf of the South Vietnamese government provisions that he, Thieu, had already rejected". Thieu completely castigated the agreement and proposed 129 textual changes to the document. He went further, demanding that the Demilitarized Zone separating the two Vietnams be recognized as a true international border and not as a "provisional military demarcation line" (as had been stipulated in the Geneva Accords) and that South Vietnam be recognized as a sovereign state. The supreme irony, in the words of Stanley Karnow, had now arrived: "having fought a war to defend South Vietnam's independence, the United States was now denying its legitimacy."

Thieu then went one step further on 26 October, and publicly released an altered version of the text that made the South Vietnamese provisions look even worse than they actually were. (Note: Thieu alleged, for instance, that the U.S. would cease all aid to South Vietnam and that, according to the clauses of the agreement, all members of the Southern government would have to resign.) The North Vietnamese leadership, believing that they had been deceived by Kissinger, responded by broadcasting portions of the agreement that gave the impression that the agreement conformed to Washington and Saigon's objectives. Kissinger, hoping to both reassure the Communists of America's sincerity, and convince Thieu of the administration's dedication to a compromise, held a televised press conference at the White House during which he announced "[w]e believe that peace is at hand."

On 20 November, the South Vietnamese revisions, and 44 additional changes demanded by Nixon, were presented to the North Vietnamese delegation by Kissinger. These new demands included: that the DMZ be accepted as a true international boundary; that a token withdrawal of North Vietnamese troops take place; that the North Vietnamese guarantee an Indochina-wide cease fire; and that a strong international peace-keeping force (the ICCS) be created for supervising and enforcing the cease-fire.<

Once the North Vietnamese read the new demands, they began to retract their own concessions and wanted to bargain anew, leading Kissinger to proclaim that they were "stalling". The talks, scheduled to last ten days, ended on 13 December, with both parties agreeing to resume negotiations. Teams of experts from each side met to discuss technicalities and protocols on 14 December, during which time the North Vietnamese representatives submitted a Vietnamese-language text of the protocol on prisoners containing several important changes that Hanoi had failed to gain in the main negotiating sessions. At a subsequent meeting of experts on 16 December, the North Vietnamese side "stone-walled from beginning to end". The talks broke down that day, and the Hanoi negotiators refused to set a date for the resumption of negotiations.

== Prelude ==
=== Decisions ===
Nixon was now working against a January deadline. Kissinger's "peace is at hand" statement had raised expectations of a settlement among Americans. Even weightier on the President's mind was the fact that the new 93rd Congress would go into session on 3 January, and the President feared that the heavily Democratic legislative branch would preempt his pledge of "peace with honor" by legislating an end to the war.

Also prompting the President toward some form of rapid offensive action was the cost of the force mobilization that had accompanied Operation Linebacker. The additional aircraft and personnel assigned to Southeast Asia for the operation was straining the Pentagon's budget. The cost of maintaining this "augmentation force" totaled over $4 billion by mid-autumn and Secretary of Defense Melvin Laird insisted that the President request a supplementary defense appropriation from Congress to pay for it. Nixon and Kissinger were convinced that the legislative branch "would seize the opportunity to simply write the United States out of the war".

After returning from Paris on 14 December, and after consultations with Nixon, Kissinger fired off an ultimatum to Hanoi, threatening "grave consequences" if North Vietnam did not return to the negotiating table within 72 hours. On that day, Nixon ordered the reseeding of North Vietnamese ports with air-dropped naval mines and that the Joint Chiefs of Staff direct the Air Force to begin planning for a bombing campaign (a three-day "maximum effort" operation) which was to begin within 72 hours. Two days after the 16 December deadline had passed, the U.S. bombed Hanoi. Senior Air Force officers James R. McCarthy and George B. Allison stated years later that the operation had been mainly politically driven, as a negotiation tool to "bring the point home".

Many historians of the Vietnam War follow the lead of President Nixon, who claimed that Hanoi's representatives had walked out of the talks, refusing to continue the negotiations. Both sides had proclaimed their willingness to continue the talks; however, Hanoi's negotiators refused to set a date, preferring to wait for the incoming Congress. The goal of President Nixon was not to convince Hanoi, but to convince Saigon. President Thieu had to be assured that "whatever the formal wording of the cease-fire agreement, he could count on Nixon to come to the defense of South Vietnam if the North broke the cease-fire."

=== Planning ===
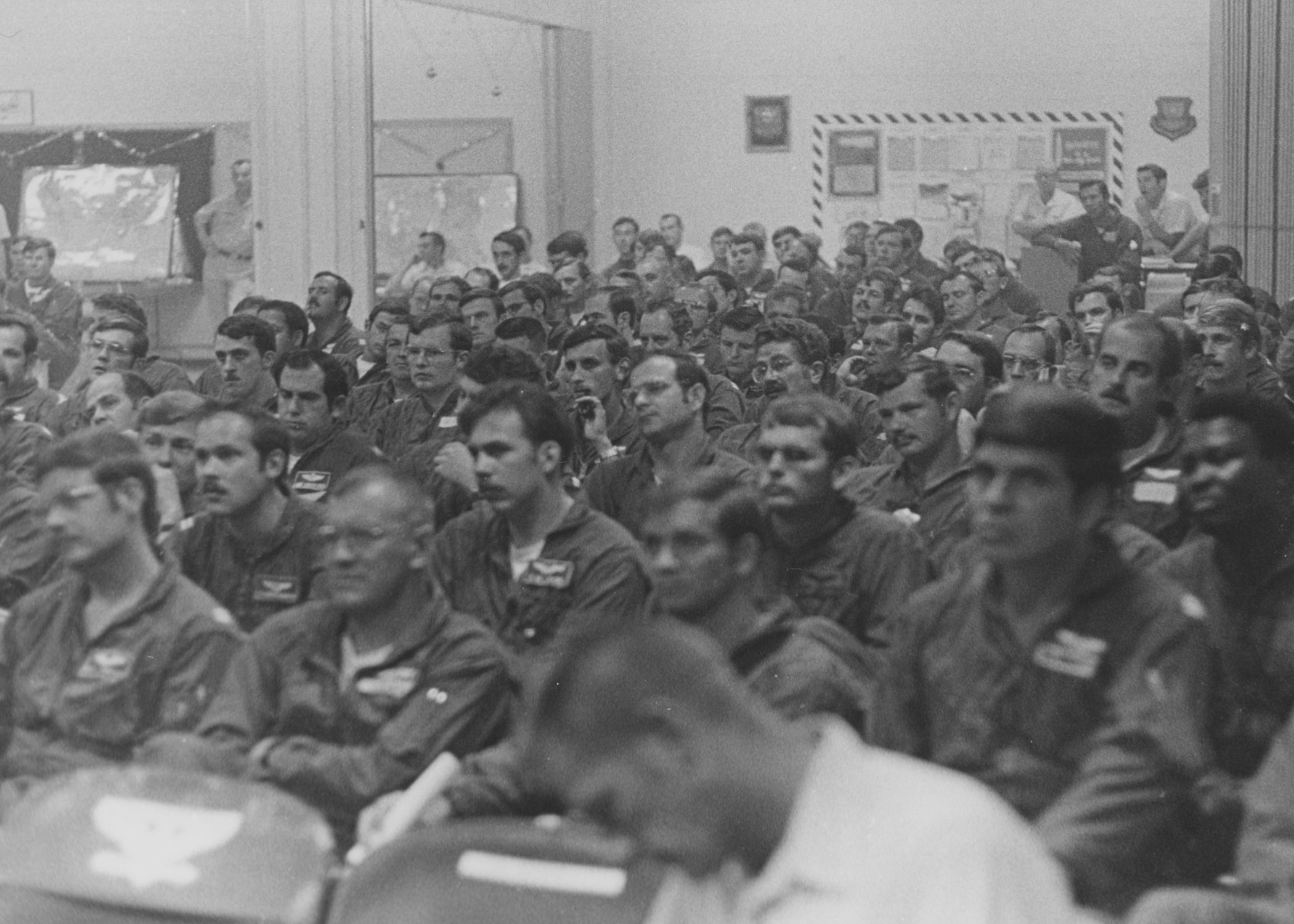
B-52 bombing crews at Andersen Air Force Base, Guam being briefed on the operation.

In the wake of Operation Linebacker, the U.S. had a force of 207 B-52 bombers available for use in Southeast Asia. A total of 54 bombers (all B-52Ds) were based at U-Tapao RTAFB in Thailand, while 153 were based at Andersen Air Force Base in Guam (55 B-52Ds and 98 B-52Gs). This deployment comprised nearly half of the Air Force's manned bomber fleet, and Strategic Air Command (SAC) commanders were initially reluctant to risk the expensive aircraft and their highly trained crews in such an operation; the production line for B-52s had long since been shut down, and losses could not be replaced. (Note: Within the administration, the operation was opposed by Secretary of Defense Laird, his deputy, and the Chairman of the Joint Chiefs of Staff, Admiral Thomas Moorer.)The use of large numbers of B-52s was unprecedented in the war and the proposed mass attacks on targets within 10 nautical miles (20 km) of Hanoi "represented a dynamic change in the employment of air resources".

The new operation, given the title Linebacker II, was marked by top-down planning by the SAC headquarters at Offutt AFB. Due to the restrictive time frame imposed by President Nixon (only three days) and the experience of Linebacker (in which North Vietnamese fighter aircraft had posed the highest threat to the bombers), SAC's plan called for all of the bombers to approach Hanoi at night in three waves, each using identical approach paths and flying at the same altitude.

Once the aircraft had dropped their bombs, they were to execute what SAC termed "post-target turns" (PTT) to the west. These turns had two unfortunate consequences for the bombers: the B-52s would be turning into a strong headwind, slowing their ground speed by 100 kn (120 mph; 190 km/h) and prolonging their stay in the target area and the PTT would point the emitter antennas of their Electronic Warfare (EW) systems away from the radars they were attempting to jam, degrading the effectiveness of the cells, as well as showing the largest radar cross-section to the missile guidance radars. The aircraft employed had significantly different EW capabilities; the B-52G carried fewer jammers and put out appreciably less power than the B-52Ds but had more efficient engines and larger fuel tanks, hence they were assigned to longer range mission routes.

=== Vietnamese air defense ===
At the start of Operation Linebacker II, North Vietnam's air defense consisted of 36 missile battalions equipped with the Soviet S-75M Dvina (SA-2 Guideline). Although this missile system was first introduced in 1957 and was considered somewhat outdated by 1972 standards, about half of these units were actively involved in the operation. The Vietnamese People's Air Force (VPAF) had a small fleet of only 71 operational aircraft, and of those, only 47 (including 31 MiG-21s and 16 MiG-17s) were suitable for air combat. While they also had MiG-19s made in China, these were not used in actual combat. Out of nearly 200 pilots, only 13 MiG-21 pilots and five MiG-17 pilots were trained to fly at night or in difficult weather conditions. Approximately 40% (75 out of 194) of the pilots were relatively young and less experienced.

== Bombing ==
=== Initial phase ===
The first three missions of the operation were flown as planned by SAC on three consecutive nights beginning on 18 December 1972. On the first night 129 bombers took off, 87 of them from Guam. 39 support aircraft of the Seventh Air Force, the Navy's Task Force 77 and the Marine Corps supported the bombers by providing F-4 Phantom fighter escorts, Republic F-105 Thunderchief Wild Weasel SAM-suppression missions, Air Force Douglas EB-66 Destroyer and Navy Grumman EA-6 Prowler radar-jamming aircraft, chaff drops, KC-135 refueling aircraft and search and rescue aircraft; the skies were dominated by American airpower to ensure the safety of the aircraft involved in the operation. One B-52 bomber pilot flying out of Guam recalled: "We took off one airplane a minute out of Guam for hours. Just on time takeoff after on time takeoff."

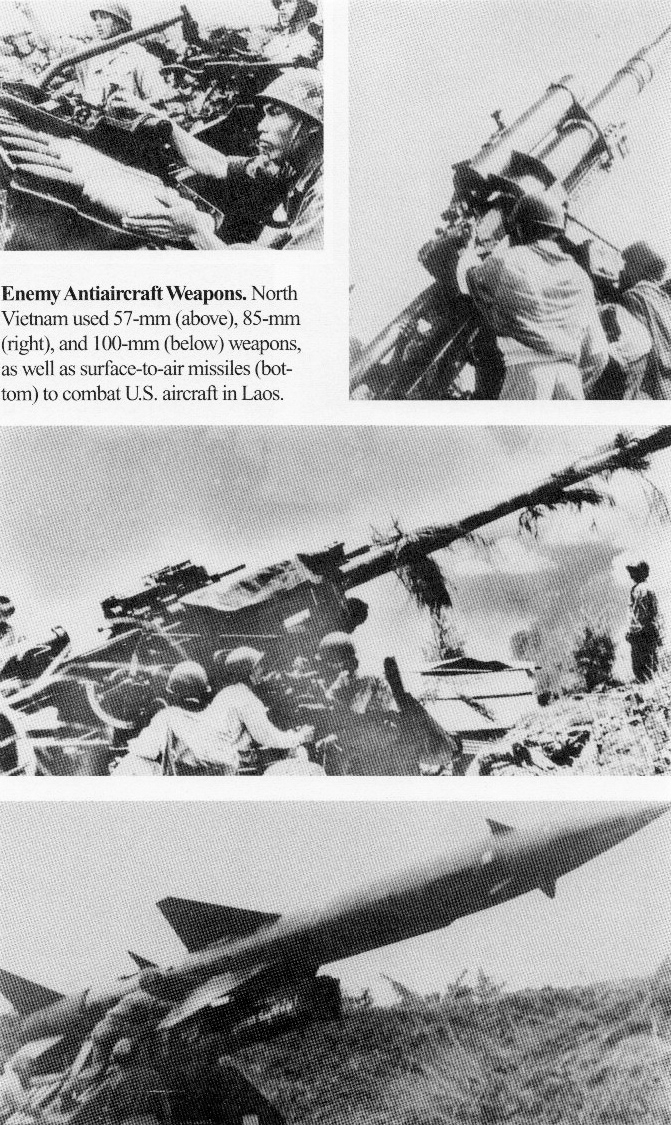
North Vietnamese anti-aircraft weapons

The targets of the first wave of bombers were the North Vietnamese airfields at Kép, Phúc Yên and Hòa Lạc and a warehouse complex at Yên Viên while the second and third waves struck targets around Hanoi. Three B-52's were shot down by the 68 surface-to-air missiles (SAMs) launched by North Vietnamese batteries, two B-52Gs from Andersen and a B-52D from U-Tapao. Two of the B-52's were shot down over North Vietnam, while the third aircraft made it back to Thailand before crashing. Two D models from Andersen with heavy battle damage managed to limp into U-Tapao for repairs. Of the three downed B-52's, parts of two crews were captured after bailing out over North Vietnam, while the third crew were all rescued in Thailand That same evening, an Air Force F-111 Aardvark was shot down while on a mission to bomb the broadcasting facilities of Radio Hanoi. Unlike Linebacker, which had been launched in response to a North Vietnamese offensive in South Vietnam, President Nixon did not address the nation on television to explain the escalation. Instead, Kissinger held a press conference at which he accused (at Nixon's behest) Le Duc Tho of having "backed off" on some of the October understandings.

On the second night, 93 sorties were flown by the bombers. Their targets included the Kinh No Railroad and storage area, the Thái Nguyên thermal power plant, and the Yên Viên complex. Although 20 SAMs were launched and a number of the bombers were damaged, none were lost on the mission. SAC expected that the third (and supposedly last) night of the operation would proceed just as well as the previous one. The targets of the 99 bombers sent in on 20 December included the Yên Viên railyards, the Ai Mo warehouse complex, the Thái Nguyên power plant, a transshipment point at Bắc Giang, the Kinh No Railroad complex and the Hanoi petroleum products storage area—all in or near Hanoi. The combination of repetitive tactics, degraded EW systems and limited jamming capability led to dire consequences when, as the official Air Force history of the campaign has stated, "all hell broke loose."

The repetitious nature of the previous evening's strike profiles had allowed North Vietnamese air defense forces to anticipate strike patterns and to salvo 34 missiles into the target area. Four B-52Gs and three B-52Ds were lost in the first and third waves of the mission. A fourth D model, returning to Thailand, crashed in Laos. Only two of the eight downed crews were recovered by search and rescue aircraft. The repercussions from the mission were fast and furious. SAC headquarters was under pressure from "many external sources" to "stop the carnage ... it has become a blood bath". Of more concern was the position taken by a number of senior Air Force officers that they "would lose too many bombers and that airpower doctrine would be proven fallacious ... or, if the bombing were stopped, the same thing would occur".

The main problem seemed to lie within the headquarters of SAC, which had based its tactics on a MiG threat that had not materialized during the three missions. The tactics (flight paths, altitudes, formations, timing, etc.) had not varied. The Air Force explanation for this course of events was that the similarity would be helpful to the B-52 crews, who were inexperienced in flying in such high-threat environments. Air Force historian Earl Tilford offered a differing opinion: "Years of dropping bombs on undefended jungle and the routines of planning for nuclear war had fostered a mind-set within the SAC command that nearly led to disaster ... Poor tactics and a good dose of overconfidence combined to make the first few nights of Linebacker nightmarish for the B-52 crews." During the operation the USAF depended almost entirely on the Ryan Model 147 Buffalo Hunter AQM-34L/M unmanned aerial vehicles for bomb damage assessment due to bad weather.

=== Re-evaluation ===
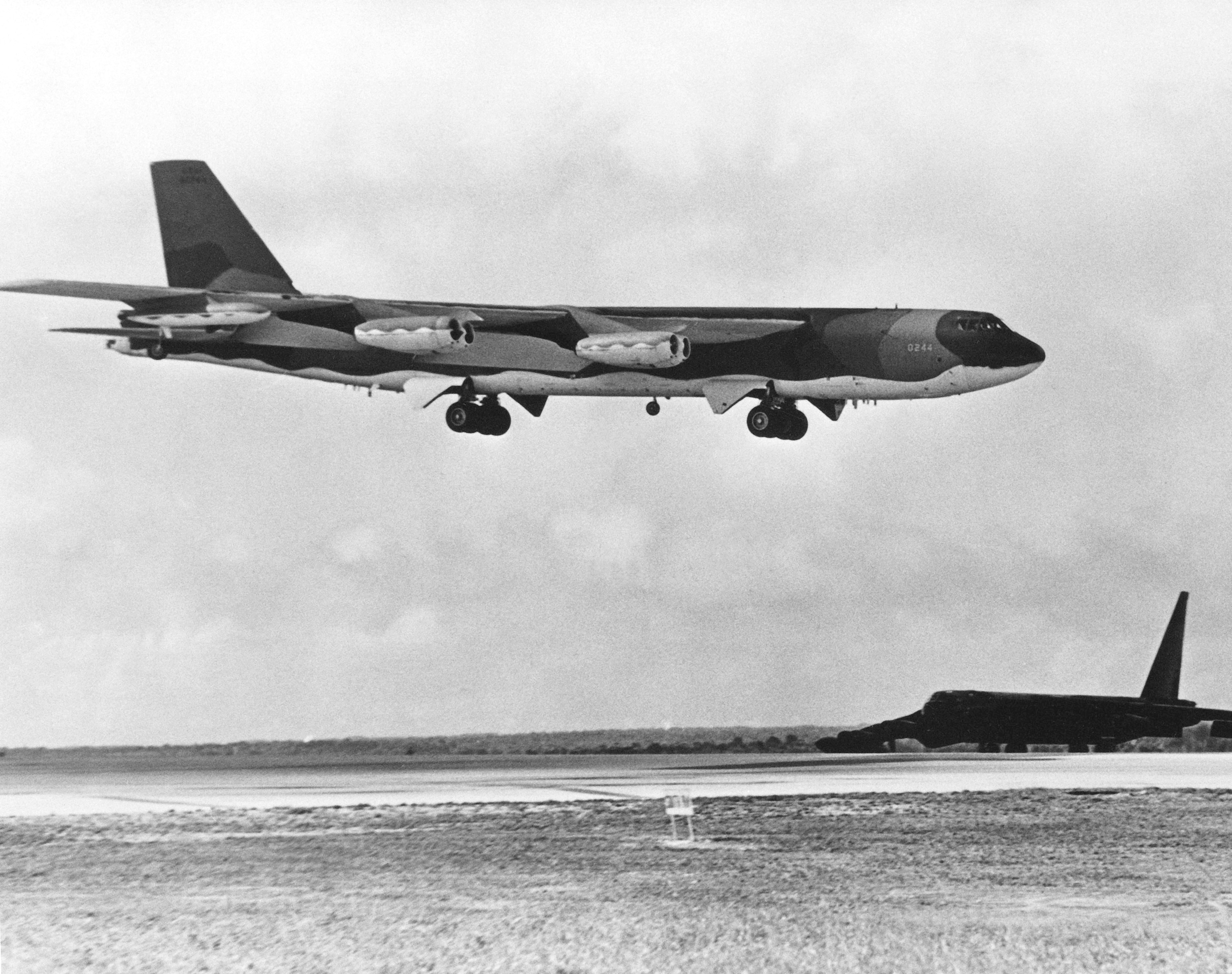
A B-52G lands at Andersen AFB after a mission on 15 December 1972.

It was at this point that President Nixon ordered that the effort be extended past its original three-day deadline. The first change that could be made by local Air Force commanders was divulged by a comparison of the differences between the radar jamming equipment of the B-52 models. The equipment aboard the G models was designed for use in the more sophisticated air defense environment of the Soviet Union, not against the more antiquated SA-2 and Fan Song radar systems used by the North Vietnamese. SAC headquarters stipulated that only the aircraft stationed at U-Tapao (equipped with more powerful and sophisticated ECM gear) be allowed over the North. On the fourth night (21 December) of the operation, 30 of the U-Tapao bombers struck the Hanoi storage area, the Văn Điển storage depot, and Quang Te Airfield. Two more of the D models were lost to Surface to Air Missiles (SAMs). On the following night, the target area shifted away from Hanoi to the port city of Haiphong and its petroleum storage areas. Once again, 30 aircraft participated in the strikes, but this time there were no losses among the bombers. An F-111 was shot down over the Kinh No Railroad complex.

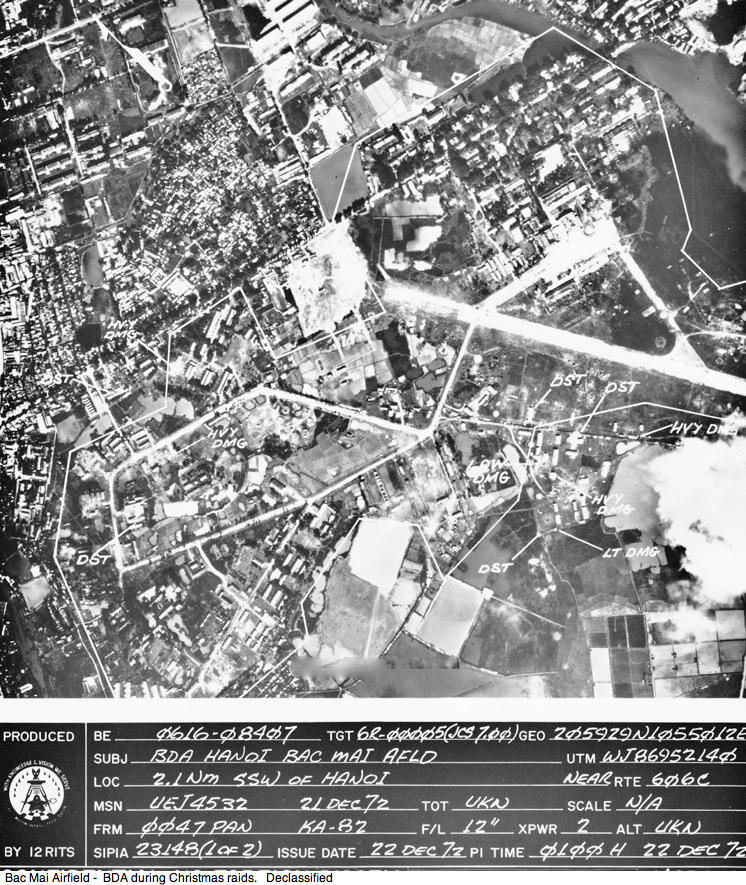
Bach Mai Airfield bomb damage assessment 21 December 1972

On the 22nd, over 100 bombs from a B-52 hit the Bach Mai Hospital in the southern suburbs of Hanoi, obliterating the building and killing 28 doctors, nurses and pharmacists and wounding 22, despite most taking refuge in the hospital's basement. Almost the entire hospital was destroyed, including the operating rooms and pharmacy stock. The US military claimed that the hospital "frequently housed anti-aircraft positions." According to the director of the hospital, Đỗ Doãn Đại, the US bombing served to break the morale of hospital staff and Hanoians.

The civilian deaths were criticized by the North Vietnamese and U.S. peace activists. The hospital sat 1 kilometer from the runway of Bach Mai Airfield and a major fuel storage facility was only 180 metres (200 yd) away. Two days before Christmas, SAC added SAM sites and airfields to the target list. Air Force F-111s were sent in before the bombers to strike the airfields and reduce the threat of enemy fighters. The F-111s proved so successful in these operations that their mission for the rest of the campaign was shifted to SAM site suppression.

The bomber missions of the sixth night (23 December) again avoided Hanoi and hit SAM sites northeast of the city and the Lang Dang Railroad yards. There were no losses. On the following night, the run of American good luck (and avoidance of Hanoi) continued. Thirty bombers, supported by 69 tactical aircraft, struck the railyards at Thái Nguyên and Kép and no American aircraft were lost during the mission. Although the B-52s got most of the publicity during the campaign, the tactical aircraft were also hard at work. While the B-52s and F-111s attacked by night, an average of 69 tactical aircraft of the Air Force, Navy and Marines attacked by day (averaging nearly 100 sorties per day). Losses for these aircraft were extremely light, with fewer than a dozen lost during the entire campaign. It was not difficult for their crews to deduce why. The North Vietnamese air defense forces "simply waited for nightfall and the arrival of more lucrative targets."

=== Final phase ===
The strikes of 24 December were followed by a 36-hour Christmas stand-down, during which Air Force planners went to work to revise their plans for the next phase of operations. Due to aircraft losses during the initial phase, they intended to launch an all-out attack on North Vietnam's air defenses when the operation resumed. This course was also necessary since, by Christmas, most of the strategic targets within North Vietnam were in shambles. SAC also belatedly turned over tactical mission planning to its subordinate Eighth Air Force headquarters on Guam, which promptly revised the tactics. Instead of using waves, all of the bombers would be in and out of the target area within 20 minutes and they would approach from different directions and at different altitudes. They would exit by varying routes and the steep PTTs were eliminated. Ten targets, in the Hanoi and Haiphong areas were to be struck by bombers approaching in seven streams, four of which were to come in off the Gulf of Tonkin.

On 26 December 120 bombers lifted off to strike Thái Nguyên, the Kinh No complex, the Duc Noi, Hanoi, and Haiphong Railroads and a vehicle storage area at Văn Điển. 78 of the bombers took off from Andersen AFB in one time block, the largest single combat launch in SAC history, while 42 others came in from Thailand. The bombers were supported by 113 tactical aircraft which provided chaff corridors, escort fighters, Wild Weasel SAM suppression and electronic countermeasures support. The North Vietnamese air defense system was overwhelmed by the number of aircraft it had to track in such a short time and by a dense blanket of chaff laid down by the fighter-bombers. 250 SAMs had been fired from 18 until 24 December and the strain on the remaining North Vietnamese inventory showed, since only 68 were fired during the mission. (Note: The claim made by both general and Air Force historians was that the North Vietnamese SAM inventory was eventually depleted during the campaign. The historian Herman Gilster disagreed with this assessment. "The number of SAMs sighted per B-52 sortie increased from 1.2 during the first phase of the campaign to 1.9 during the last phase. A more reasonable answer to the decline in attrition would be the change in U.S. tactics after the third night.") One B-52 was shot down near Hanoi and another damaged aircraft made it back to U-Tapao, where it crashed just short of the runway. Only two members of the crew survived.

On the following night, 60 bombers flew, with some attacking SAM sites while others struck Lang Dang, Duc Noi, the Trung Quang Railroad and Văn Điển. One B-52 was so heavily damaged that its crew ejected over Laos, where it was rescued. A second aircraft was not so lucky. It took a direct hit and went down while attacking the Trung Quang Railroad yards. During the evening's operations two F-4s and an HH-53 search and rescue helicopter were also shot down. Day ten (28 December) called for strikes by 60 B-52s–15 Gs and 15 Ds from Andersen and 30 Ds from U-Tapao, The aircraft formed six waves attacking five targets. Four of the waves struck targets in the Hanoi area (including SAM Support Facility #58), while the fifth hit the Lang Dang Railroad yards southwest of Lạng Sơn, a major choke-point on the supply route from the People's Republic of China. No aircraft were lost on the mission. By the eleventh day (29 December), there were few strategic targets worthy of mention left within North Vietnam. There were two SAM storage areas at Phúc Yên and the Lang Dang yards that could be profitably attacked. A total of 60 aircraft again made the trip North but the mix was altered; U-Tapao again provided 30 D models but the Andersen force was varied, putting 12 G models and 18 Ds over the North. Total bombing was rounded out by sending 30 G models on Arc Light missions in the southern panhandle of North Vietnam and in South Vietnam.

== Aftermath ==
=== Negotiating ===
On 22 December, Washington asked Hanoi to return to the talks with the terms offered in October. On 26 December, Hanoi notified Washington that it was willing to "impress upon Nixon that the bombing was not the reason for this decision, the CPV Politburo told Nixon that halting the bombing was not a precondition for further talks". Nixon replied that he wanted the technical discussions to resume on 2 January and that he would halt the bombing if Hanoi agreed. They did so and Nixon suspended aerial operations north of the 20th parallel on 30 December. He then informed Kissinger to agree to the terms offered in October, if that was what it took to get the agreement signed. Senator Henry Jackson (D, Wash.), tried to persuade Nixon to make a televised address to explain to the American people that "we bombed them in order to get them back to the table." It would have been extremely difficult to get informed observers in the U.S. to believe that he "had bombed Hanoi in order to force North Vietnamese acceptance of terms they had already agreed to".

Now the only stumbling block on the road to an agreement was President Thieu. Nixon tried to placate him by writing on 5 January that "you have my assurance of continued assistance in the post-settlement period and that we will respond with full force should the settlement be violated by North Vietnam." By this time, due to congressional opposition, Nixon was in no position to make such a promise, since the possibility of obtaining the requisite congressional appropriations was nil. The South Vietnamese president still refused to agree. On 14 January, Nixon made his most serious threat: "I have therefore irrevocably decided to proceed to initial the agreement on 23 January 1973 ... I will do so, if necessary, alone".

On 9 January, Kissinger and Le Duc Tho returned to Paris. The agreement struck between the U.S. and North Vietnam was basically the same one that had been reached in October. The additional demands that had been made by the U.S. in December were generally discarded or went against the U.S. John Negroponte, one of Kissinger's aides during the negotiations, was more caustic: "[w]e bombed the North Vietnamese into accepting our concessions." The DMZ was defined as provided for in the Geneva Accords of 1954, and would in no way be recognized as an international boundary. The demanded withdrawal of North Vietnamese troops from South Vietnam was not mentioned at all in the text of the agreement. Kissinger did obtain a "verbal agreement" from Tho for a token withdrawal of 30,000 North Vietnamese troops.

The demand for an inclusive, Indochina-wide cease-fire was simply discarded in the written agreement. Once again, Kissinger had to be satisfied with a "verbal understanding" that a cease-fire would be instituted in Laos simultaneous with or shortly following that in South Vietnam. An agreement on Cambodia (where the North Vietnamese had no influence over the Khmer Rouge) was out of the question. The size of the ICCS was finally decided by splitting the difference in the number demanded by both parties at 1,160 personnel. The Paris Peace Accords were signed at the Majestic Hotel in Paris on 27 January 1973.

=== Outcome and assessments ===
==== Military ====
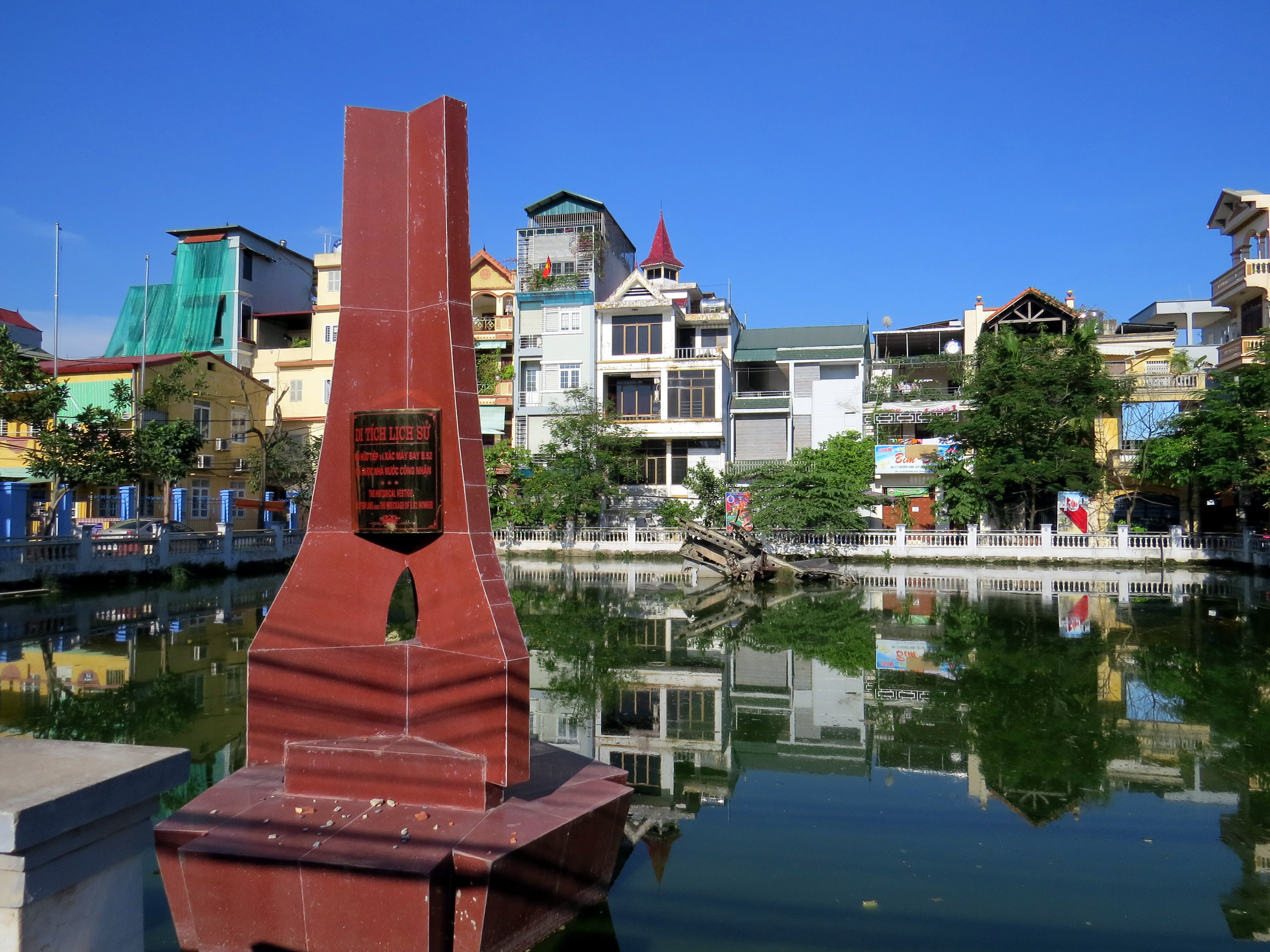
B-52 wreckage left as a historical attraction in Hanoi as of 2022

During Operation Linebacker II, 741 B-52 sorties were dispatched to bomb North Vietnam; 729 completed their missions. B-52s dropped 15,237 tons of ordnance on 18 industrial and 14 military targets (including eight SAM sites) while fighter-bombers added another 5,000 tons of bombs to the tally. Another 212 B-52 missions were flown within South Vietnam in support of ground operations during the campaign. Ten B-52s were shot down over the North and five others were damaged and crashed in Laos or Thailand. Thirty-three B-52 crew members were killed or missing in action, another 33 became prisoners of war, and 26 more were rescued.

Over 11 days, North Vietnamese air defenses fired 266 SA-2 missiles downing—according to North Vietnam—34 B-52s and four F-111s. While warding off the massive strike by U.S strategic, tactical and carrier aviation, the North Vietnamese missile air defense forces conducted over 180 engagements, two-thirds of which were against B-52s. North Vietnamese claims of aircraft destroyed or shot down differ greatly from US official records. In Marshall Michel's 2002 book The 11 Days of Christmas: America's Last Vietnam Battle, the author uses mission records to confirm that "15 B-52s were shot down ... 10 crashed 'on the spot' in North Vietnam and 5 were able to move out of the Hanoi area and into Laos or Thailand before they crashed". North Vietnam claimed 36 aircraft destroyed (31 B-52s and 5 tactical aircraft) with the expenditure of 244 missiles against the B-52s and 22 missiles against tactical aircraft, or 7.9 missiles for every B-52 aircraft shot down, or 4.4 missiles for every tactical aircraft shot down. During the offensive, they initially overcame various types of interference and obstacles employed by the U.S aircraft to interrupt missile engagement. In the latter stages of the bombing campaign, due to a change in tactics, B-52 losses decreased significantly. By the last night of the campaign, no losses were reported. During the 11 days of Operation Linebacker, the B-52s flew 795 sorties with a loss rate of 2.63 percent (15 were shot down and five others were heavily damaged)

The Air Force flew 769 sorties and 505 were flown by the Navy and Marine Corps in support of the bombers. Twelve of these aircraft were lost on the missions (two F-111s, three F-4s, two A-7s, two A-6s, an EB-66, an HH-53 rescue helicopter and an RA-5C reconnaissance aircraft). During these operations, ten American aviators were killed, eight captured and 11 rescued. US Air Force losses included fifteen B-52s, two F-4s, two F-111s, one EB-66 and one HH-53 search-and-rescue helicopter. Navy losses included two A-7s, two A-6s, one RA-5 and one F-4. Seventeen of these losses were attributed to SA-2 missiles, three to daytime MiG attacks, three to antiaircraft artillery and four to unknown causes. U.S. forces claimed eight MiGs were shot down during the operation, including two by B-52 tail gunners. The two B-52 tail gunner kills were not confirmed by VPAF, and they admitted to the loss of only three MiGs.

According to Dana Drenkowski and Lester W. Grau, the number of aircraft lost by the USAF is unconfirmed since the USAF figures are also suspect. If a plane was badly damaged but managed to land, the USAF did not count as a loss, even if it was a write-off. During the operation, the USAF told the press that 17 B-52s were lost but later, the USAF told Congress that only 13 B-52s were lost. Nine B-52s that returned to U-Tapao airfield were too badly damaged to fly again. The number of B-52s that managed to return to Guam but were combat losses remains unknown. The overall B-52 loss is probably between 22 and 27.

During this operation, the VPAF launched 31 air sorties of which 27 were flown by MiG-21s and four were flown by MiG-17s. They conducted eight aerial engagements and claimed two B-52s, four F-4s and one RA-5C shot down. Their losses were three MiG-21s. Two B-52s were claimed by North Vietnamese MiG-21 fighter pilots; both incidents were attributed to SAMs by the U.S. The raids inflicted severe damage to North Vietnam's infrastructure. The Air Force estimated the bombs caused 500 rail interdictions, destroyed 372 pieces of rolling stock and 11,000 cubic meters (3 million U.S. gallons) of petroleum products and eliminated 80 percent of North Vietnam's electrical power production capability. Logistical imports into North Vietnam, assessed by U.S. intelligence at 160,000 tons per month when the operation began, had dropped by January 1973, to 30,000 tons per month. Lê Duẩn later admitted that the bombing "completely obliterated our economic foundation." Despite the damage, an enormous effort was made to keep transportation networks open. Some 500,000 workers were mobilized to repair bomb damage as needed, with an additional 100,000 constantly at work. The raids did not break the stalemate in the South, nor halt the flow of supplies down the Ho Chi Minh trail.

=== Casualties ===
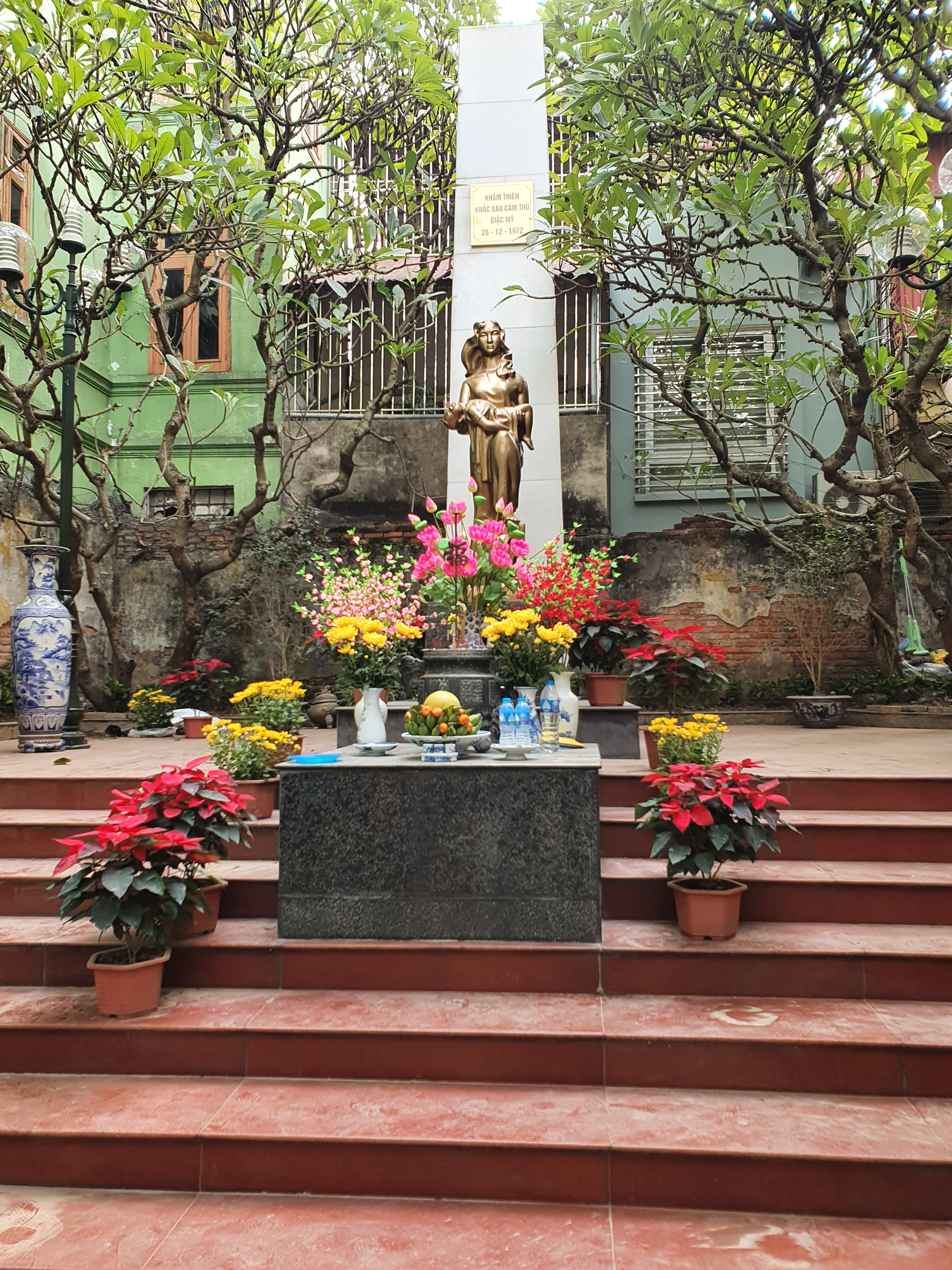
Khâm Thiên Memorial

According to official North Vietnamese sources the bombing campaign killed 1,624 civilians, including 306 in Haiphong and 1,328 in Hanoi. The book "Hanoi – The aerial Điện Biên Phủ" from the "People's Army Publishing House" gives a death toll of 2,368 civilians killed and 1,355 others injured. The book states that a number of neighborhoods and villages were destroyed, 5,480 houses and nearly 100 other buildings including factories, schools, hospitals, and stations were destroyed. By 20 December 1972, there were 215 dead and 325 injured in Hanoi. In Hai Phong alone on 18 December, 45 people were killed, 131 people were injured. Kham Thien Street, Hanoi was attacked on the night of 26 December 1972, killing 278 people, including 91 women, 40 old people, and 55 children. 178 children were orphaned in Kham Thien Street and 290 people were injured, 2,000 houses, schools, temples, theaters, and clinics collapsed, of which 534 houses were completely destroyed.

House 51 on Kham Thien Street was completely blown into a crater and the seven people living there were killed. This area has been converted into a memorial with a stele bearing the words "Khâm Thiên deeply holds the hatred of the American enemy" and a bronze statue of a woman holding a child who died from an American bomb was based on the owner of the destroyed house. On the anniversary of the bombing each year, people living on the street and other places come to the memorial to burn incense sticks to commemorate those who died from American airstrikes. In the courtyard of Bạch Mai Hospital, there is a stele bearing the word "Hatred" to remember the bombing of the hospital on 22 December, which killed 1 patient and 30 nurses and doctors. At the time of the bombing, most doctors and patients had already been evacuated. Each department had only a few people on duty and approximately 300 patients had taken cover in the basement.

==== Diplomatic ====
The North Vietnamese government reported that the U.S. had "carpet-bombed hospitals, schools, and residential areas, committing barbarous crimes against our people", citing the bombing of Bach Mai Hospital on 22 December and Kham Thien street on 26 December which they claimed had killed 278, wounded 290 and destroyed more than 2,000 homes.

Both the Soviet Union and China denounced the bombing, while some Western countries also criticized the US operation. In a famous speech, Olof Palme, the Prime Minister of Sweden, compared the bombing to a number of historical crimes including the bombing of Guernica, the massacres of Oradour-sur-glane, Babi Yar, Katyn, Lidice and Sharpeville and the extermination of Jews and other groups at Treblinka. He said that "now another name can be added to this list: Hanoi, Christmas 1972". In response to his protests, the U.S. withdrew their ambassador from Sweden, and told Stockholm not to send a new ambassador to Washington.

The new Prime Minister of Australia, Gough Whitlam, whose country had pushed America to expand the war, angered the Nixon administration by criticizing the bombing in a letter to the U.S. President, chilling United States–Australia relations until Whitlam's dismissal in 1975. In the U.S., Nixon was criticized as a "madman", and some of the people who supported Operation Linebacker I questioned the necessity and unusual intensity of Operation Linebacker II. Newspaper headlines included: "Genocide", "Stone-Age Barbarism" and "Savage and Senseless". The USAF Strategic Air Command (SAC) made some serious mistakes, suffered serious losses and their campaign came close to failure, yet after the war they launched a massive media and public relations blitz (and internal witch hunt) to prove that Linebacker II was an unqualified success that unfolded as planned. US officials claimed that the operation had succeeded in forcing North Vietnam's Politburo to return to negotiating, citing the Paris Peace Accords signed shortly after the operation. Much of the American public had the impression that North Vietnam had been "bombed into submission".

In Paris, the North Vietnamese refused to change the terms they had agreed to in the October 1972 agreement. When South Vietnam's President Nguyen Van Thieu objected to the terms, Nixon threatened to depose him like Ngo Dinh Diem. In January 1973, the U.S. signed the agreement as the Paris Peace Accords. The main effect of the accord was to usher the United States out of the war.

Journalist Bob Woodward later wrote that Richard Nixon thought, prior to Operation Linebacker II, that previous bombing campaigns against North Vietnam had achieved "zilch". Woodward wrote that in early 1972 Nixon wrote a note to National Security Adviser Henry Kissinger, which said there was "something wrong" with the way the strategy was being carried out. Other notes, written at the same time, show that Nixon was frustrated with the resistance of the North Vietnamese and wanted to punish them, in an effort to "go for broke".

Some historians believed that Hanoi was not in need of any settlement, and only agreed to do so to get the United States out of Vietnam. The historian Gareth Porter wrote that Hanoi's objective was an agreement on the October terms, and that "the bombing of Hanoi and Haiphong forced Nixon and Kissinger to accept the terms they had earlier rejected." However, according to Pierre Asselin, had the bombing been a failure, as Hanoi said it was, the North Vietnamese leadership would never have agreed to Nixon's request to talk. Hanoi agreed to resume talks only because the bombing had crippled their country. Additionally, the bombing paved the way for the finalization of an agreement, thus ending American intervention on terms acceptable to the Nixon administration. Nevertheless, the terms were also favorable to North Vietnam.

American historian A.J. Langguth wrote the Christmas bombing was "pointless" as the final peace agreement of 23 January 1973 was essentially the same as that of 8 October 1972, as Thọ refused to make any substantial concessions. John Negroponte, in the 2017 documentary The Vietnam War, was disdainful of the attack's value, stating "[w]e bombed them into accepting our concessions."

== U.S. aircraft lost ==
Date	Type	Service	Cause
18 Dec.	F-111A	USAF	unk.
18 Dec.	B-52G	USAF	SA-2
18 Dec.	B-52G	USAF	SA-2
18 Dec.	B-52D	USAF	SA-2
18 Dec.	A-7C	USN	SA-2
20 Dec.	B-52D	USAF	SA-2
20 Dec.	B-52G	USAF	SA-2
20 Dec.	B-52G	USAF	SA-2
20 Dec.	B-52D	USAF	SA-2
20 Dec.	B-52G	USAF	SA-2
20 Dec.	B-52G	USAF	SA-2
20 Dec.	A-6A	USN	SA-2
21 Dec.	B-52D	USAF	SA-2
21 Dec.	B-52D	USAF	SA-2
21 Dec.	A-6A	USN	SA-2
22 Dec.	F-111A	USAF	AAA
23 Dec.	EB-66E	USAF	engine out
23 Dec.	A-7E	USN	SA-2
23 Dec.	F-4J	USN	SA-2
26 Dec.	B-52D	USAF	SA-2
26 Dec.	B-52D	USAF	SA-2
27 Dec.	F-4E	USAF	MiG-21
27 Dec.	F-4E	USAF	MiG-21
27 Dec.	HH-53	USAF	small arms
27 Dec.	B-52D	USAF	SA-2
27 Dec.	B-52D	USAF	SA-2
28 Dec.	RA-5C	USN	MiG-21

== U.S. air order of battle ==
United States Air Force – Eighth Air Force (Strategic Air Command)
Wing	Station	Aircraft
43d Strategic Wing	Andersen AFB, Guam	B-52D
72d Strategic Wing (Provisional)	Andersen AFB, Guam	B-52G
307th Strategic Wing	U Tapao RTAFB, Thailand	B-52D

United States Air Force – Seventh Air Force (Pacific Command)
Wing	Station	Aircraft
8th Tactical Fighter Wing †	Ubon RTAFB, Thailand	F-4
354th Tactical Fighter Wing	Korat RTAFB, Thailand	A-7
388th Tactical Fighter Wing	Korat RTAFB, Thailand	F-4, F-105G
432d Tactical Reconnaissance Wing ‡	Udorn RTAFB, Thailand	F-4, RF-4
474th Tactical Fighter Wing	Takhli RTAFB, Thailand	F-111

† additionally, two squadrons from the 4th TFW at Seymour Johnson AFB, North Carolina, and one squadron from 33d TFW at Eglin AFB, Florida
‡ additionally, two squadrons from 366th TFW after its departure from Da Nang AB, RVN

United States Navy – Task Force 77 (Pacific Command)
Air Wing	Ship	Aircraft
Carrier Air Wing 8	USS America (CVA-66)	F-4, A-6, A-7
Carrier Air Wing 14	USS Enterprise (CVAN-65)	F-4, A-6, A-7
Carrier Air Wing 5	USS Midway (CVA-41)	F-4, A-6, A-7
Carrier Air Wing 19	USS Oriskany (CVA-34)	F-8, A-7
Carrier Air Wing 2	USS Ranger (CVA-61)	F-4, A-6, A-7
Carrier Air Wing 3	USS Saratoga (CVA-60)	F-4, A-6, A-7

== See also ==
- B-52 Victory Museum, Hanoi
- Vietnam People's Air Force Museum, Hanoi
- Girl from Hanoi (1974 film)

== Bibliography ==
=== Published government documents ===
- Gilster, Herman L. (1993). The Air War in Southeast Asia: Case Studies of Selected Campaigns. Maxwell Air Force Base, AL: Air University Press. ISBN 978-1-42946545-8.
- Head, William P. (2002). War from Above the Clouds: B-52 Operations During the Second Indochina War and the Effects of the Air War on Theory and Doctrine. Maxwell AFB, AL: Air University Press. OCLC 54838431.
- McCarthy, James R.; Allison, George B. (1979). Linebacker II: A View from the Rock. Maxwell Air Force Base, AL: Air University Press. OCLC 5776003.
- Nalty, Bernard C. (1995). Air War Over South Vietnam: 1969–1975. Washington DC: Center of Air Force History. ISBN 978-0-16050914-8.
- Schlight, John (1993). A War Too Long. Washington, DC: Center of Air Force History. OCLC 464220328.
- Smith, Philip E.; Herz, Peggy (1992). Journey into Darkness. New York: Pocket Books. ISBN 978-0-67172823-6.
- Thompson, Wayne (2002). To Hanoi and Back: The U.S. Air Force and North Vietnam, 1966–1973 (PDF). Washington, DC: Air Force History and Museums Program, United States Air Force. ISBN 978-1-56098877-9.
- Tilford, Earl H. (1991). Setup: What the Air Force Did in Vietnam and Why. Maxwell Air Force Base, AL: Air University Press. ISBN 978-1-42945827-6.

=== Secondary sources ===
- Asselin, Pierre (2002). A Bitter Peace: Washington, Hanoi and the Making of the Paris Agreement. Chapel Hill, NC: University of North Carolina Press. ISBN 978-0-80786123-3.
- Ambrose, Stephen E. (2005). "The Christmas Bombing". In Cowley, Robert (ed.). The Cold War: A Military History. New York: Random House. ISBN 978-0-37550910-0.
- Casey, Michael; Dougan, Clark; Lipsman, Samuel; Sweetman, Jack; Weiss, Stephen (1987). Flags into Battle. Boston, MA: Boston Publishing Co. ISBN 978-0-20111676-2.
- Clodfelter, Mark. The Limits of Air Power: The American Bombing of North Vietnam (2006)
- Dorr, Robert F; Peacock, Lindsay (2000) [1995]. Boeing's Cold War Warrior: B-52 Stratofortress. Oxford: Osprey. ISBN 978-1-84176097-1.
- Drendel, Lou (1984). Air War over Southeast Asia. Vol. 3, 1971–1975. Carrollton, TX: Squadron/Signal. ISBN 978-0-89747148-0.
- Drenkowski, Dana; Grau, Lester W. (December 2007). "Patterns and Predictability: The Soviet Evaluation of Operation Linebacker II" (PDF). Journal of Slavic Military Studies. 20 (4): 559–607. doi:10.1080/13518040701703096. S2CID 143833568. Archived from the original (PDF) on 14 March 2016.
- Hastings, Max (2018). "Chapter 25: Big Ugly Fat Fellers". Vietnam: An Epic Tragedy, 1945–1975. Harper.
- Herring, George C. (1979). America's Longest War: The United States and Vietnam, 1950–1975. New York: McGraw-Hill. ISBN 978-0-47101547-5.
- Hobson, Chris (2001). Vietnam Air Losses Usaf/navy/marine, Fixed-wing Aircraft Losses Southeast Asia 1961–1973. North Branch, MN: Specialty Press. ISBN 978-1-85780-115-6.
- Karnow, Stanley (1983). Vietnam: A History. New York: Viking Books. ISBN 978-0-670-74604-0.
- Lipsman, Samuel; Weiss, Stephen (1985). The False Peace: 1972–74. Boston, Massachusetts: Boston Publishing Co. ISBN 978-0-201-11272-6.
- Littauer, Raphael; Uphoff, Norman (1972). The Air War in Indochina. Boston, MA: Beacon Press. ISBN 978-0-80700249-0.
- McCarthy, Donald J. Jr. (2009). MiG Killers: A Chronology of US Air Victories in Vietnam 1965–1973. North Branch, MN: Speciality Press. ISBN 978-1-58007136-9.
- Michel III, Marshall L. (1997). Clashes, Air Combat Over North Vietnam 1965–1972. Annapolis, MD: Naval Institute Press. ISBN 978-1-59114519-6.
- Michel, Marshall L. (2002). The 11 Days of Christmas: America's Last Vietnam Battle. Encounter Books. ISBN 978-1-89355424-5.
- Morocco, John (1985). Rain of Fire: Air War, 1969–1973. Boston, MA: Boston Publishing Co. ISBN 978-0-93952614-7.
- Thompson, Wayne (2000). To Hanoi and Back: The United States Air Force and North Vietnam 1966–1973. Washington DC: Government Printing Office. ISBN 978-1-56098877-9.
- Toperczer, István (2001). MiG-21 Units of the Vietnam War. Combat Aircraft 29. Oxford: Osprey. ISBN 978-1-84176263-0.
- Van Thai, Hoang; Van Quang, Tran, eds. (2002) [1988]. Victory in Vietnam: The Official History of the People's Army of Vietnam, 1954–1975. Translated by Pribbenow, Merle L. Lawrence, KA: University Press of Kansas. ISBN 978-0-70061175-1.
- Zaloga, Steven J. (2007). Red SAM: The SA-2 Guideline Anti-Aircraft Missile. Oxford: Osprey. ISBN 978-1-84603062-8.
