= Bach Mai Airfield =

Former airport in Hanoi, Vietnam (1917)

Bach Mai Airfield Sân bay Bạch Mai
- Bach Mai Airfield in 1967
- IATA: none; ICAO: none

Summary
- Airport type: Military
- Location: Hanoi
- Elevation AMSL: 15.24 m / 50 ft
- Coordinates: 20°59′48″N 105°49′55″E
- Interactive map of Bach Mai Airfield

Runways
Direction	Length		Surface
Direction	m	ft	Surface
02	2,001	6,565	Asphalt

Bach Mai Airfield is a disused military airport in Thanh Xuân district, Hanoi, Vietnam, located along modern-day Le Trong Tan street. It was constructed by the French in 1917 and used by French forces until 1954; along with Gia Lam Airbase, it was one of the major logistics bases supporting French operations at Dien Bien Phu. After 1954, it was used by the Vietnamese People's Air Force and served as their air defense command and control center during the Second Indochina War, playing a part in the Cambodian–Vietnamese War as well. It is now the site of the Vietnam People's Air Force Museum, where a number of period military aircraft are on display.

== History ==
=== 1918-1940 ===
In 1918 the 1st Escadrille d'Indochine moved to Bach Mai.

In 1939 the unit was redesignated le Groupe Mixte Aérien 595 formed of L'escadrille d'observation 1/595 with the Potez 25 and an escadrille de chasse 2/595 with the Morane-Saulnier M.S.406.

=== Vichy French units at Bach Mai, 1940-1945 ===
Unit	Aircraft	Base
Escadrille d'observation 1/41	Potez 25 A2 model	Hanoi (Bach Mai)
Groupe aerien mixte 42	Potez 633	Hanoi (Bach Mai)

These units saw action in the Franco-Thai War of 1940–41.

Following the Japanese Invasion of French Indochina in September 1940 the remaining aircraft were formed into the Groupement Aérien Nord Indochine, but this was dissolved in March 1943 due to wear and tear and lack of spare parts. During the Japanese coup d'état in French Indochina all remaining French aircraft were destroyed.

=== First Indochina War, 1945-1954 ===
The following units were based at Bach Mai between 1945 and 1954:

==== Air Force ====
Unit	Aircraft	Base
Fighter Squadron 1/8	F8F Bearcat	Hanoi (Bach Mai)
Transport Squadron 2/62 'Franche-Comté'	Dakota DC-3	Hanoi (Bach Mai)
Transport Squadron 2/64 'Anjou'	Dakota DC-3	Hanoi (Bach Mai)
80th Overseas Reconnaissance Squadron (EROM 80)	RF8F Bearcat (reco); B-26 Invader C model (reco)	Hanoi (Bach Mai)

==== Naval Air Arm ====
Unit	Aircraft	Base
3rd Carrier Attack Squadron; Flottille 3F	SB2C-5 Helldiver	Carrier Arromanches (Tourane); Hanoi (Bach Mai)
14th Carrier Fighter Squadron; Flottille 14F	F4U-7 Corsair; AU-1 Corsair	Carrier Bois Belleau (Halong Bay); Hanoi (Bach Mai)

Bach Mai and Gia Lam Airbase were the major logistics bases supporting French operations at Dien Bien Phu.

=== Second Indochina War, 1964-1973 ===
Bach Mai Airfield was used as the air defense command and control center for the Vietnamese People's Air Force during the Second Indochina War. Due to its location in the restricted area of a radius of 30 nautical miles (reduced to 10 in 1967) from the center of Hanoi and its proximity to the Bach Mai Hospital 1 km away, Bach Mai Airfield was off limits to US bombers during the early years of Operation Rolling Thunder with the result that North Vietnamese command and control was generally unmolested. Presidential approval was required for an attack on the airfield and it was attacked for the first time by F-105 Thunderchiefs of the 388th Fighter Wing on 17 November 1967. Bombing restrictions were lifted during Operation Linebacker I and the airfield was attacked on 16 May 1972. On 21 December 1972 in Operation Linebacker II, 2 B-52D's were lost to SA-2 missiles while attacking the airfield. On 22 December 1972 a string of bombs missed Bach Mai Airfield and instead hit Bach Mai Hospital killing 28 hospital staff.

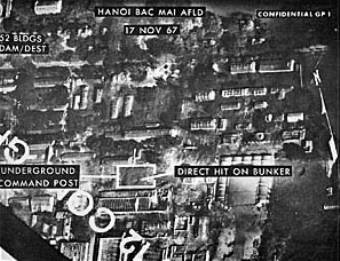
Bach Mai Airfield bomb damage assessment 17 November 1967

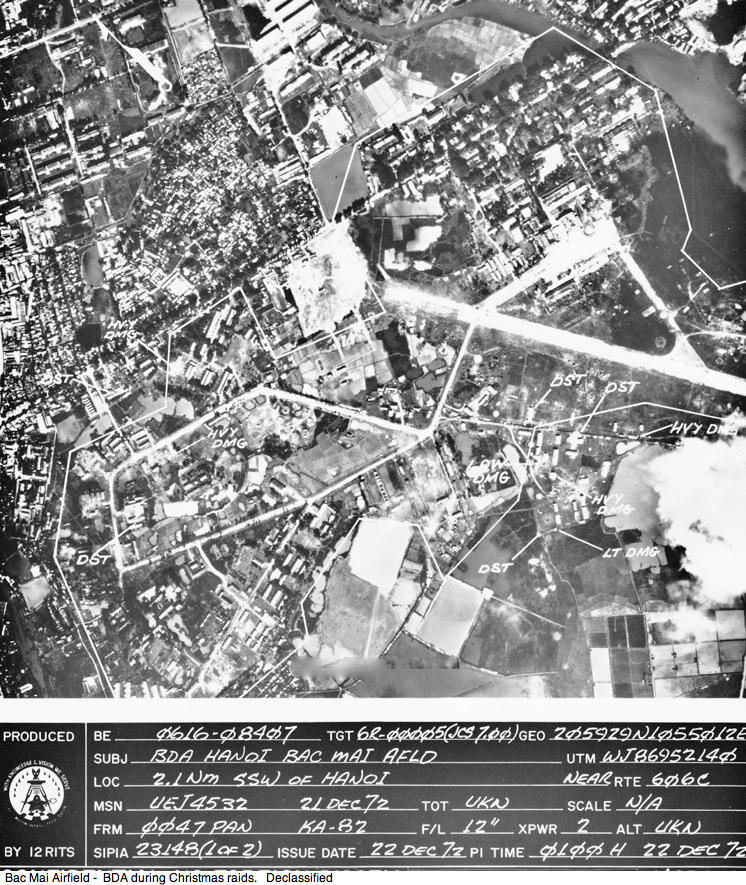
Bach Mai Airfield bomb damage assessment 21 December 1972

== See also ==
- Vietnamese People's Air Force Museum, Hanoi
