= Hòa Lạc Air Base =

- Part of Vietnam Air Defence - Air Force
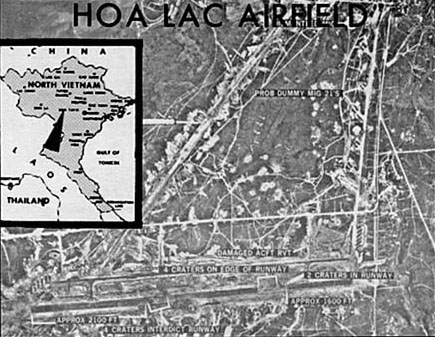
- Hòa Lạc Air Base, 1967

Site information
- Type: Air Force Base
- Controlled by: Vietnam Air Defence - Air Force

Location
- Coordinates: 21°02′16.8″N 105°29′24″E

Site history
- Built: 1967
- In use: 1967-Present
- Battles/wars: Vietnam War

Airfield information
- IATA: none; ICAO: VVYL

Summary
- Interactive map of Airfield information

Hòa Lạc Airfield is a Vietnam Air Defence - Air Force (VADAF) (Không quân Nhân dân Việt Nam) military heliport located approximately 24 km (15 miles) west of Hanoi.

== History ==
=== Vietnam War ===
The airfield started operation in February 1967. On 26 March 1967 Col Robert Scott flying an F-105 shot down a Hòa Lạc-based MiG-17. In May the base was first attacked by the USAF.

Hòa Lạc, Kép and Phúc Yên were targeted on the first night of Operation Linebacker II on 18 December 1972 to suppress fighters that might otherwise intercept US attack aircraft.

=== Current use ===
The VADAF 916th Helicopter Squadron is based at Hòa Lạc.

On 7 July 2014 a VADAF Mi-171 crashed while on a parachute training mission near Hòa Lạc killing 17 passengers and crew.
