= Phan Thiet Airport =

Airport in Vietnam

Phan Thiet Airport Sân bay Phan Thiết Cảng Hàng không Phan Thiết
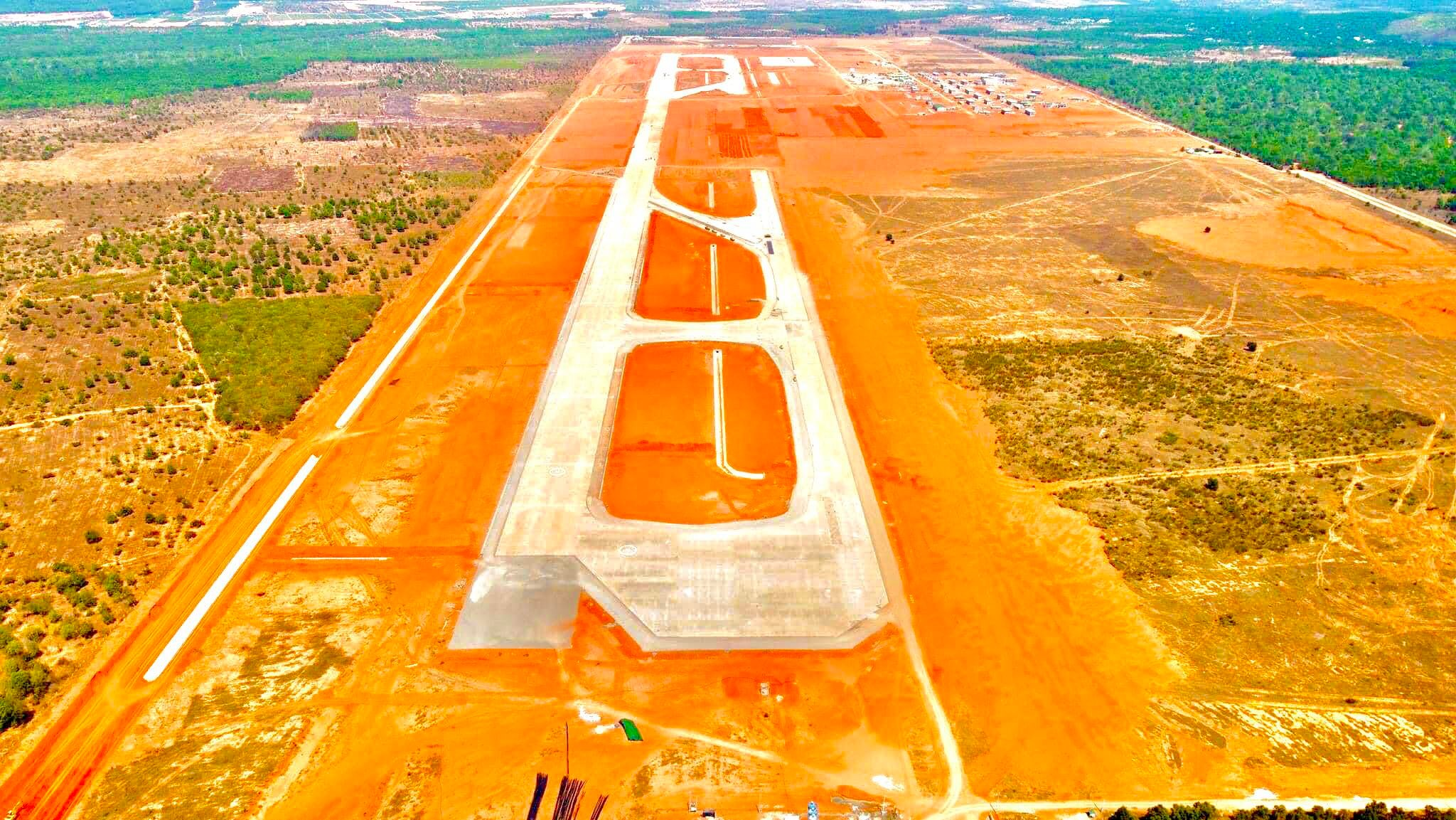
- During its construction in early 2023.
- IATA: none; ICAO: VVPT

Summary
- Airport type: Military/Public
- Owner: Vietnam Ministry of National Defence
- Operator: Sun Phan Thiet Airport LLC
- Serves: Phan Thiết
- Location: Phan Thiết, Lâm Đồng, Vietnam
- Occupants: Air Force Officer's College
- Coordinates: 10°59′45″N 108°13′31″E

Maps
- Location within Vietnam

Runways
| Direction | Length | | Surface |
| Direction | m | ft | Surface |
|---|---|---|---|
| 03/21 | 3,050 | 10,000 | Concrete |

Phan Thiet Airport (ICAO: VVPT) is an airport in Thiện Nghiệp, Phan Thiết, Lâm Đồng province, Vietnam. The mixed-use facility will cost around VND10 trillion (US$435.28 million) to build. The 543-hectare (1,340-acre) airport will be able to serve 500,000 passengers per year, according to the government website. It will consist of one 3,000-meter long runway and one 5,000-square-meter terminal.

In 2024, the military section of the airport has entered operations. It is currently serving as major garrisons for Vietnam Air Defence - Air Force's Regiments 920 (Yak-52, T-6C) and 915 (Mi-8), both are trainer units under the country's Air Force Officers College.

== History ==
By 2017, Binh Thuan People's Committee proposed to upgrade Phan Thiet 4C Airport to level 4E, runway from 2,400 m to 3,050 m in length to be able to exploit international flights in the future. One year later, the project approved by the Prime Minister is one of 15 domestic airports in the country with a 4E grade civilian airport combined with level 1 military airport.

On 5 April 2021, Phan Thiet airport project in Thien Nghiep commune resumed for construction by the Vietnam's Ministry of Defense, the project will be completed by the end of 2022. Phan Thiet Airport was approved by the Prime Minister in 2009, covering 543 hectares. It was started in early 2015 and expected to be completed in 2018, but then stopped.

On 29 July 2024, the Vietnam People's Air Force (VPAF) 920th Air Training Regiment of the Air Force Officer's College finished moving all of its Iak-52 trainer aircraft from its old base at Cam Ranh International Airport to the new base at airport. Before that, on 17 July, the 920th Regiment, together with the 918th Transport Regiment, conducted a series of calibration flights to test out equipment at the airport. The 920th Regiment will operate Yak-52s and T-6 Texan IIs at the airport.

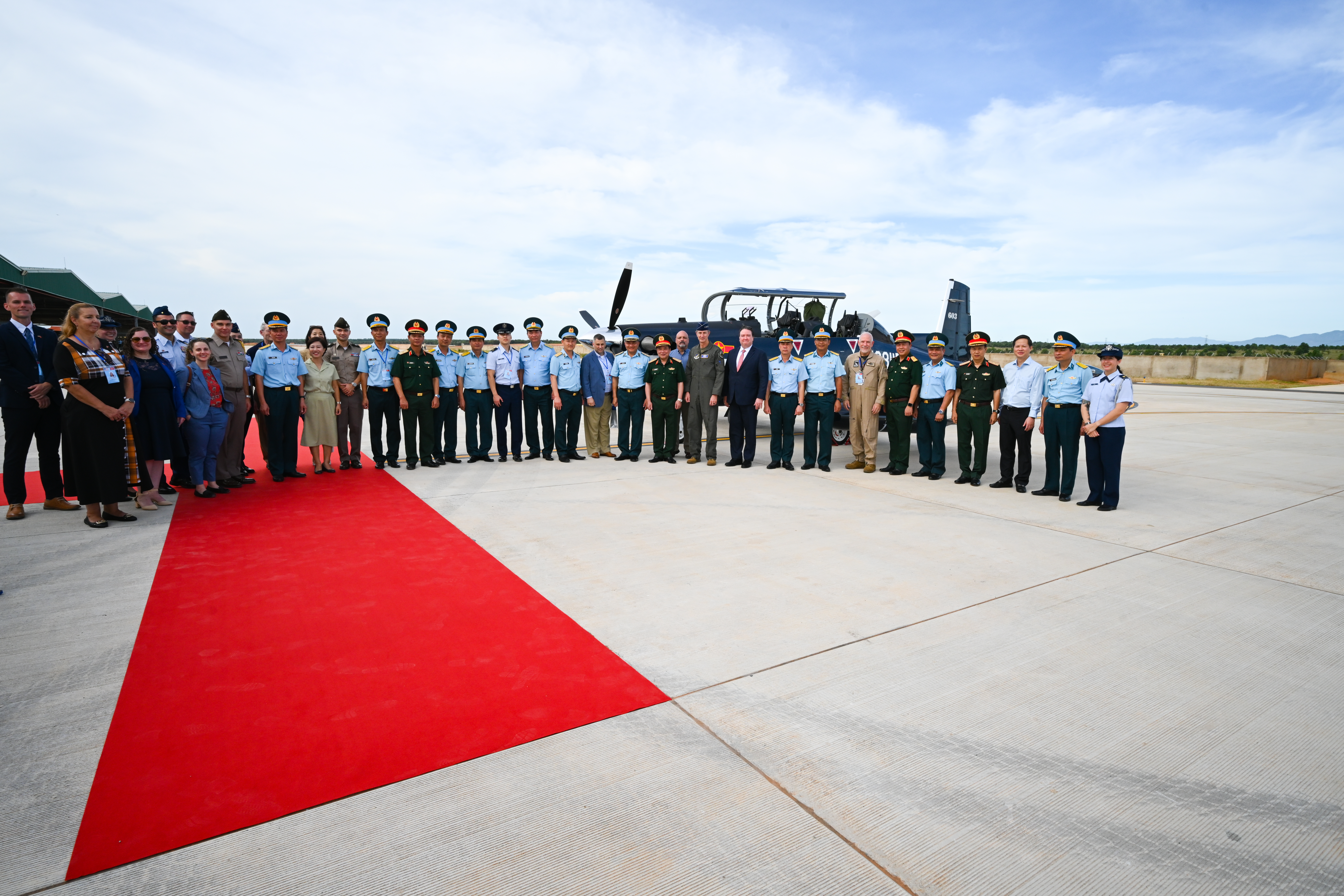
Beechcraft T-6 Texan II at Phan Thiết.

On 20 November 2024 the first three T-6Cs were delivered to the VPAF at the airport.
