= Kép Air Base =

- Part of Vietnam People's Air Force
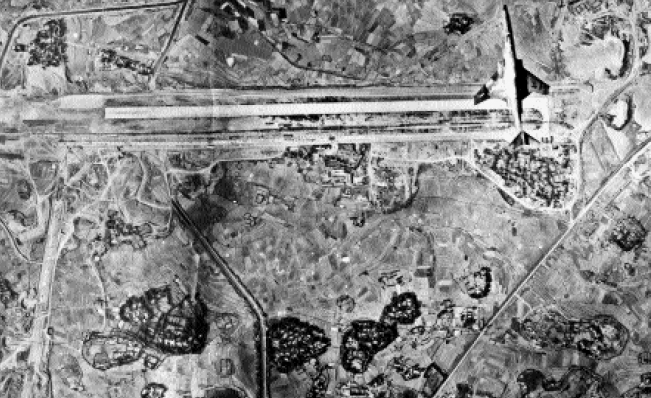
- A USAF RF-101C overflies Kep in 1966

Site information
- Type: Air Force Base
- Controlled by: Vietnam People's Air Force

Location
- Coordinates: 21°23′23″N 106°15′09″E

Site history
- Built: 1965
- In use: 1965-Present
- Battles/wars: Vietnam War

Airfield information
- IATA: none; ICAO: VVKP

Summary
- Interactive map of Airfield information

Runways
Direction	Length		Surface
Direction	ft	m	Surface
07L/25R	6,000	1,829	Concrete
07R/25L	6,000	1,829	Concrete

Kép Air Base is a Vietnam People's Air Force (VPAF) (Không quân Nhân dân Việt Nam) military airfield located near the ward of Kép, Bắc Ninh approximately 60 km (37 miles) northeast of Hanoi.

== History ==
=== Vietnam War ===
A September 1965 CIA intelligence briefing stated that Kép airfield had been extensively improved with the runway lengthened to 6000 ft allowing for jet fighter operations and photo-reconnaissance indicated that 8 aircraft, identified as MiG-15s or MiG-17s were at the airfield. In April 1966 the CIA concluded that a small number of MiG-21s had possibly deployed to Kép from Phúc Yên Air Base.

On 24 April 1967, jets from VA-112 and VA-144 attacked Kép in the first U.S. airstrike on a VPAF airfield of the Vietnam War.

On 1 May 1967 during a sortie against Kép a Douglas A-4 Skyhawk of VA-76, shot down a MiG-17 with Zuni rockets, this was the only MiG kill by an A-4 during the Vietnam War.

A Regiment-sized unit of Korean People's Air Force MiG pilots known as Đoàn Z (Group Z) flew from Kép from late 1967 through 1968.

On 15 June 1972 during Operation Linebacker U.S. fighter-bombers attacked the base cratering the runway. The base was attacked again on 18 June with further damage to the runway.

Kép, Phúc Yên and Hòa Lạc were targeted on the first night of Operation Linebacker II on 18 December 1972 to suppress fighters that might otherwise intercept US attack aircraft.

=== Current use ===
The VPAF 927th and 940th Fighter Regiment operating Su-30MK2s, Su-27SK/UBK and Yak-130 is based at Kép.
