= Vietnam People's Air Force Museum, Hanoi =

Museum in Hanoi, Vietnam

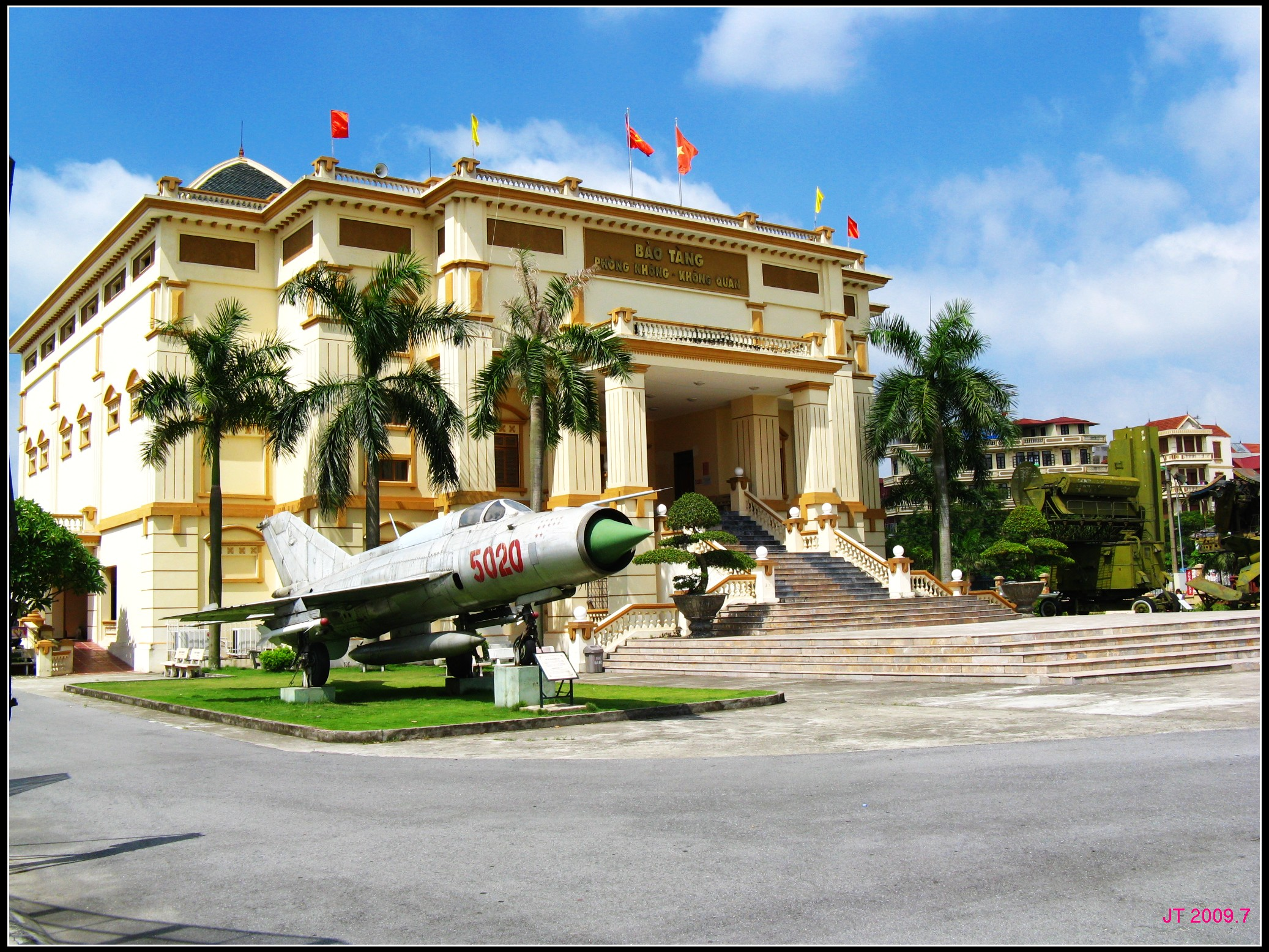
- Coordinates: 20°59′59″N 105°49′45″E

The Vietnam People's Air Force Museum, Hanoi or Bảo Tàng Phòng Không - Không Quân is located on Truong Chinh Street in the Bach Mai District of Hanoi. The museum is on the edge of the disused Bach Mai Airfield.

The museum tells the history of the Vietnam People's Air Force (VPAF) from its formation in 1954 through to the present day. There is a heavy emphasis on its role in the Second Indochina War and the Cambodian-Vietnamese War. The museum comprises one main building with displays on the history of the VPAF, biographies of VPAF aces, uniforms and flightsuits, aircraft weaponry and engines, items from downed US aircraft and the forward fuselage of a MiG-21. Outside is a static park with aircraft of the VPAF and the Republic of Vietnam Air Force.

The museum is open Mon.-Thurs. and Sat.-Sun. from 08:00 to 11:00 and 13:00 to 16:00. Entry fee is 20,000 VND

== Aircraft on display ==
Aircraft on outside display include:

- Aero L-29 Delfín
- Antonov An-2

Plaque states that this aircraft was used in the attack on a secret US radar site at Phou Pha Thi (Battle of Lima Site 85)

- Bell UH-1H Huey
- Cessna A-37 Dragonfly
- Cessna O-1 Bird Dog
- Douglas A-1H Skyraider
- Kamov Ka-25Bsh
- McDonnell Douglas F-4 Phantom II B model (wreckage)
- Mikoyan-Gurevich MiG-17F

Plaque states that on 19 April 1972 this aircraft, piloted by Nguyen Van Bay, in company with #2019, piloted by Le Xuan Di, bombed the USS Higbee and USS Oklahoma City in the Gulf of Tonkin

- Mikoyan-Gurevich MiG-21MF & PFM

The MiG-21PFM has 12 victory stars painted on its nose, plaque states that one of the victories was US Air Force F-4E 67-0296, shot down on 5 July 1972 by Nguyễn Tiến Sâm
The MiG-21MF has 8 victory stars painted on its nose, plaque states that one of the victories was a Boeing B-52D Stratofortress, shot down on 27 December 1972 by Pham Tuan. This aircraft is displayed carrying an AA-1 Alkali radar guided missile inboard of an AA-2 Atoll IR-homing missile

- Mil Mi-4

Plaque states that this was Ho Chi Minh's personal helicopter

- Mil Mi-6 Hook-A
- Mil Mi-24 Hind A
- Northrop F-5 Freedom Fighter
- Ryan Firebee (wreckage)
- Shenyang J-5

Plaque states that this aircraft scored 9 victories, one of which was US Air Force F-4C 63-7614, shot down on 12 May 1967 by Ngo Duc Mai

- Shenyang J-6
- TL-1

A Vietnamese designed and built training and liaison aircraft

- Zlín Z-26
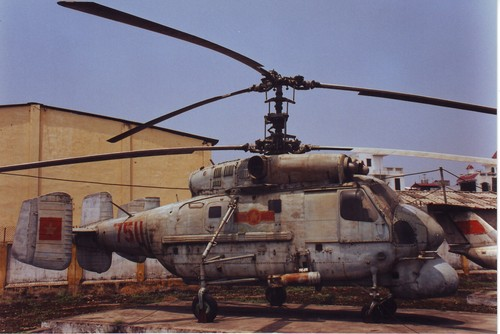
Kamov KA-25Bsh

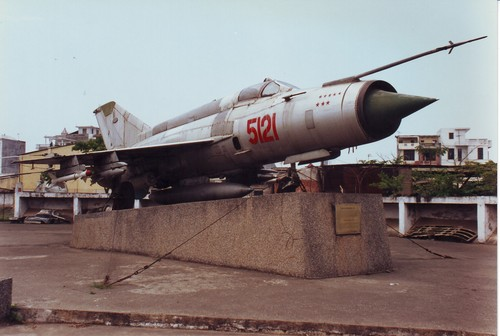
Mig 21MF

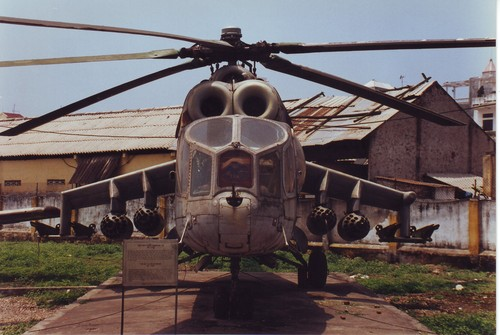
Mil Mi-24A

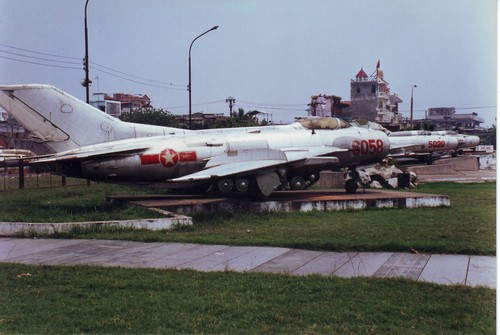
Shenyang J-6 and 2 Mig 21s

== Other display items ==
Also on display outside are:

- 57 mm AZP S-60
- SNR-75 Fan Song radar
- M1939 37mm AA gun
- M3 half-track

Plaque states that this was formerly used by Groupe Mobile 100 and captured in the Battle of Mang Yang Pass

- PT-76 light amphibious tank
- S-75 Dvina SA-2 Guideline SAM
- ZPU-4

== See also ==
- List of aerospace museums
- B-52 Victory Museum, Hanoi
- Bach Mai Airfield
