= Vietnam Air Defence - Air Force =

Aerial and space warfare branch of Vietnam's armed forces

Air Defence - Air Force Service
- Quân chủng Phòng không - Không quân
- Insignia of the Air Defence - Air Force
- Founded: 24 January 1955; 71 years ago Current formation: from 1999 (merger of Air Force Service and Air Defence Service)
- Country: Socialist Republic of Vietnam (since 1976) North Vietnam (1955-1976)
- Allegiance: Communist Party of Vietnam
- Type: Air force Space force
- Role: Aerial warfare; Anti-aircraft warfare; Space warfare
- Size: 35,000 personnel (2023) 547 active aircraft
- Part of: People's Army of Vietnam
- Headquarters: Hanoi
- Nicknames: Vietnam People's Air Force; Vietnam(ese) Air Force
- Colours: Azure, Dark Green
- March: Hành Khúc Không Quân Việt Nam (Air Force marches)
- Anniversaries: 3 March 1955; 71 years ago (Founded)
- Engagements: Vietnam War; Cambodian-Vietnamese War; Sino-Vietnamese War
- Decorations: Hero of the People's Armed Forces; Gold Star Order; Ho Chi Minh Order; Independence Order; Military Exploit Order; Fatherland Defense Order
- Battle honours: Operation Rolling Thunder; Operation Linebacker; Operation Linebacker II; The 1975 Spring Offensive
- Website: phongkhongkhongquan.vn (official Vietnamese newspaper)

Commanders
- Commander-in-Chief: President Tô Lâm
- Commander: Lieutenant General Vũ Hồng Sơn

- Political Commissar: Lieutenant General Trần Ngọc Quyến

Insignia
- Roundel

- Flag

- Badge

- Emblem (former)

- Pilot insignia

Aircraft flown
- Bomber: Su-22
- Fighter: Su-27, Su-30MK2
- Multirole helicopter: Mi-8, Mi-17/-171
- Trainer: Yak-52, L-39C, L-39 Skyfox, Yak-130, Su-22M3K, Su-27UBK
- Transport: NC212i, C-295M, Antonov An-2

The Vietnam Air Defence - Air Force (Vietnam ADAF or VN ADAF; Bộ đội Phòng không - Không quân Việt Nam), officially the Air Defence - Air Force Service (ADAF Service; Quân chủng Phòng không - Không quân (Quân chủng PK-KQ / QC PK-KQ / PKKQ)), also commonly known as the Vietnam People's Air Force (VPAF; Không quân nhân dân Việt Nam (KQNDVN)) or the Vietnam Air Force (Không quân Việt Nam (KQVN)), is the air, anti-air and space warfare service branch of Vietnam. It is the modern incarnation of the so-called North Vietnamese Air Force (NVAF) and absorbed the South Vietnamese Air Force (RVNAF/VNAF) following the reunification of Vietnam in 1975. It is one of three main branches of the People's Army of Vietnam, which is under the executive administration of the Ministry of National Defence. The main mission of the ADAF is the defence of Vietnamese aerospace and the provision of air and space cover for operations of the People's Army of Vietnam.

The modern ADAF consists of two principle components: the Air Defence (AD; Phòng không, mainly operating air-defence radars, anti-air artillery and missile systems) and the Air Force (AF; Không quân, mainly operating aerial vehicles and military aircraft for combat and transport) that are currently organised as separate divisions under the ADAF Headquarters. From 1977 to 1999, the components were split into two different service branches, before remerging as the existing unified ADAF Service in 1999, placing both components under a unified leadership to facilitate joint operations. The common name Vietnam People's Air Force (VPAF; Không quân nhân dân Việt Nam) was largely the name for the Air Force component only, especially during the days that the two AD and AF services were structured two separate service branches. VPAF later became a relatively-common "external" name for the unified service which implicitly includes the AD branch; however, this usage rarely appears in official context, especially when the AD component never refer itself as the "Air Force", while the VPAF designation is currently used in a limited manner among AF units. Hence, interchangeably calling the Vietnamese ADAF as "the VPAF" can be considered a misconception about the nature and formation of the service branch.

== History ==
=== Early years ===
The first aircraft in service for the Vietnamese Armed Forces were two trainers, a de Havilland Tiger Moth and a Morane-Saulnier, which were initially the private property of the emperor Bảo Đại. In 1945, Bảo Đại gave the aircraft to the Vietnamese government. Until 1950, even though the Vietnam People's Army (VPA) had acquired credible offensive capabilities on the ground, it was almost powerless against reconnaissance or attacking operations from the French Expeditionary Air Force. On 9 March 1949, General Võ Nguyên Giáp was authorised to establish the Air Force Research Committee (Ban Nghiên cứu Không quân) under the General Staff to study ways to deal with the air war. The first Vietnamese service aircraft flight was made by the Tiger Moth on 15 August 1949. A small-scale training was carried out in the following years.

Further development of aviation in North Vietnam began in 1956, when a number of trainees were sent to the USSR and China for pilot training. They were organised into two groups, pilots and mechanics, respectively; and among others, utilised the Czechoslovak Zlín Z-226 and Aero Ae-45. The first unit of the VPAF was the No. 919 Transport Regiment (Trung đoàn Không quân Vận tải 919), organised on 1 May 1959, with An-2, Li-2, Il-14 aircraft, followed by the No. 910 Training Regiment (Trung đoàn Không quân 910) with Yak-18 trainers. In 1963 the Air Force and Air Defence Force were merged into the Air and Air Defence Force (Quân chủng Phòng không – Không quân).

=== Vietnam War ===
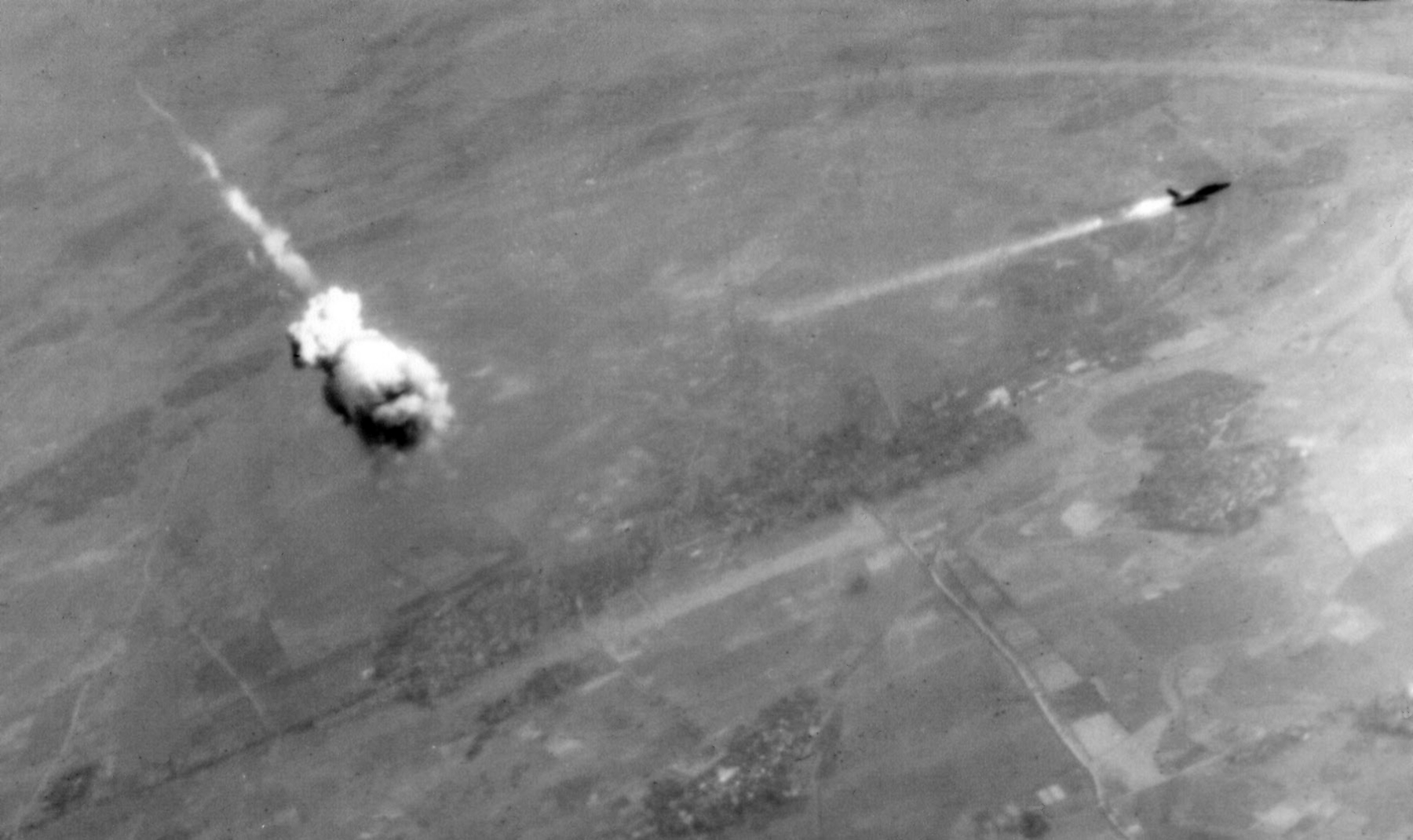
USAF F-105 Thunderchief bomber hit by a VPAF SA-2 missile

The first North Vietnamese combat plane was a T-28 Trojan trainer, whose pilot defected from the Royal Lao Air Force; it was utilised from early 1964 by the VPAF as a night fighter. The T-28 was the first North Vietnamese aircraft to shoot down a US aircraft, a Fairchild C-123 Provider transport, on 15 February 1964.

The VPAF received its first jet fighter aircraft, the MiG-17 in February 1964, but they were initially stationed at air bases on mainland China, while their pilots were being trained. On 3 February 1964, the first fighter regiment No. 921 (Trung đoàn Không quân Tiêm kích 921), aka "Red Star squadron", was formed, and on 6 August it arrived in North Vietnam with its MiG-17s. On 7 September, the No. 923 fighter regiment, aka "Yen The Squadron", led by Lt. Col. Nguyen Phuc Trach, was formed. In May 1965, No. 16 bomber company (Đại đội Không quân Ném bom 16) was formed with Ilyushin Il-28 twin engine bombers. Only one Il-28 sortie was flown in 1972 against Royal Laotian forces.

The VPAF's first jet air-to-air engagement with U.S. aircraft was on 3 April 1965. The VPAF claimed shooting down two United States Navy (USN) Vought F-8 Crusaders, which was not confirmed by U.S. sources, although they acknowledged having encountered MiGs. Consequently, 3 April became "North Vietnamese Air Force Day". On 4 April the VPAF scored the first confirmed victories to be acknowledged by both sides. The U.S. fighter community was shocked when relatively slow, MiG-17 fighters shot down advanced Republic F-105 Thunderchief fighter-bombers attacking the Thanh Hóa Bridge. The F-105s were carrying their normal heavy bomb load, and were not able to react to their attackers.

In 1965, the VPAF were supplied with supersonic MiG-21s by the USSR which were used for high-speed Ground-controlled interception (GCI) controlled hit and run intercepts against American air strike groups.

In 1965, the VPAF had only 36 MiG-17s and a similar number of qualified pilots, which increased to 180 MiGs and 72 pilots by 1968. The Americans had at least 200 USAF McDonnell Douglas F-4 Phantoms and 140 USAF F-105s, plus at least 100 USN aircraft (F-8s, Douglas A-4 Skyhawks and F-4s) which operated from the aircraft carriers in the Gulf of Tonkin, plus scores of other support aircraft. The Americans had a multiple numerical advantage.

The VPAF was a defensive air arm, with the primary mission of defending North Vietnam, and until the last stages of the war, did not conduct air operations into South Vietnam; nor did it conduct general offensive actions against enemy naval forces off the coast.

The VPAF did not engage all U.S. sorties. Most U.S. aircraft were destroyed by SA-2 surface-to-air missiles or anti-aircraft artillery (AAA), and in some cases, even small arms. Typically, VPAF MiGs would not engage unless it was to their advantage.

VPAF flew their interceptors with guidance from ground controllers, who positioned the MiGs in ambush stations. The MiGs made fast and devastating attacks against U.S. formations from several directions (usually the MiG-17s performed head-on attacks and the MiG-21s attacked from the rear). After shooting down a few American planes and forcing some of the bombers to drop their bombs prematurely, the MiGs did not wait for retaliation, but disengaged rapidly. This "guerrilla warfare in the air" proved very successful. In December 1966 the MiG-21 pilots of the 921st FR downed 14 F-105s without any losses.

The MiG-21 tactics became so effective that ultimately an operation was mounted to especially deal with the MiG-21 threat. Led by Colonel Robin Olds on 2 January 1967, Operation Bolo lured MiG-21s into the air, thinking they were intercepting an F-105 strike group, but instead found a sky full of missile-armed F-4 Phantom IIs set for aerial combat. The result was a loss of almost half the inventory of MiG-21 interceptors, for no U.S. losses. The VPAF swiftly stood down for additional training immediately following this setback.

The U.S. Air Force and the U.S. Navy continued to lay down great expectations on the F-4 Phantom, assuming that the massive arms, the perfect on-board radar, the highest speed and acceleration properties, coupled with the new tactics would provide F-4s an advantage over the MiGs. But in encounters with lighter VPAF's MiG-21, F-4 began to suffer defeat. From May to December 1966, the US lost 47 aircraft in air battles, destroying only 12 enemy fighters. From April 1965 to November 1968, in 268 air battles conducted over North Vietnam, VPAF claimed to have shot down 244 US or Republic of Vietnam Air Force (RVNAF) aircraft and they lost 85 MiGs.

The disappointing performances of USAF and USN crews, even though flying the contemporary advanced aircraft of those times, combined with a legacy of successes from World War II and the Korean War, resulted in a total revamping of aerial combat training for the USN in 1968 (Top Gun school; established 1969). The designs for an entire generation of aircraft, with engineering optimised for daylight air-to-air combat (dog fighting) against both older, as well as for emerging MiG fighters, were put on the drawing board. U.S. forces could not consistently track low flying MiGs on radar, and were hampered by restrictive rules of engagement (ROE) which required pilots to visually acquire their targets, nullifying much of the advantage of radar guided missiles, which often proved unreliable when used in combat.

On 24 March 1967, regiments Nos. 921, 923 and 919 were incorporated into the 371st Air Division "Thăng Long" (Sư đoàn Không quân 371). In 1969, No. 925 fighter regiment was formed, flying the Shenyang J-6 (the Chinese-built MiG-19). In 1972 the fourth fighter regiment, No. 927 "Lam Son", was formed.

On 12 January 1968, in one of the few offensive air attacks by the VPAF during the entire conflict, the Battle of Lima Site 85, a four aircraft formation of An-2 biplanes was reported flying towards a secret USAF TACAN and radar site in Laos guiding American bombers over North Vietnam. Two aircraft flew on to the strike, while the other two split off. As the two continuing An-2s flew over, their crews dropped 120 mm mortar shells as bombs through the aircraft's floor and also strafed their targets with 57 mm rockets from the wing pods. However, as the two aircraft flew back and forth attacking the facility, one aircraft was heavily damaged by ground fire from the facility and crashed. Meanwhile, crew at Lima Site 85 managed to call in a nearby Air America helicopter; a crew member aboard the helicopter armed with an assault rifle fired on the last biplane and caused it to crash. The site was eventually overrun by People's Army of Vietnam commando climbers.

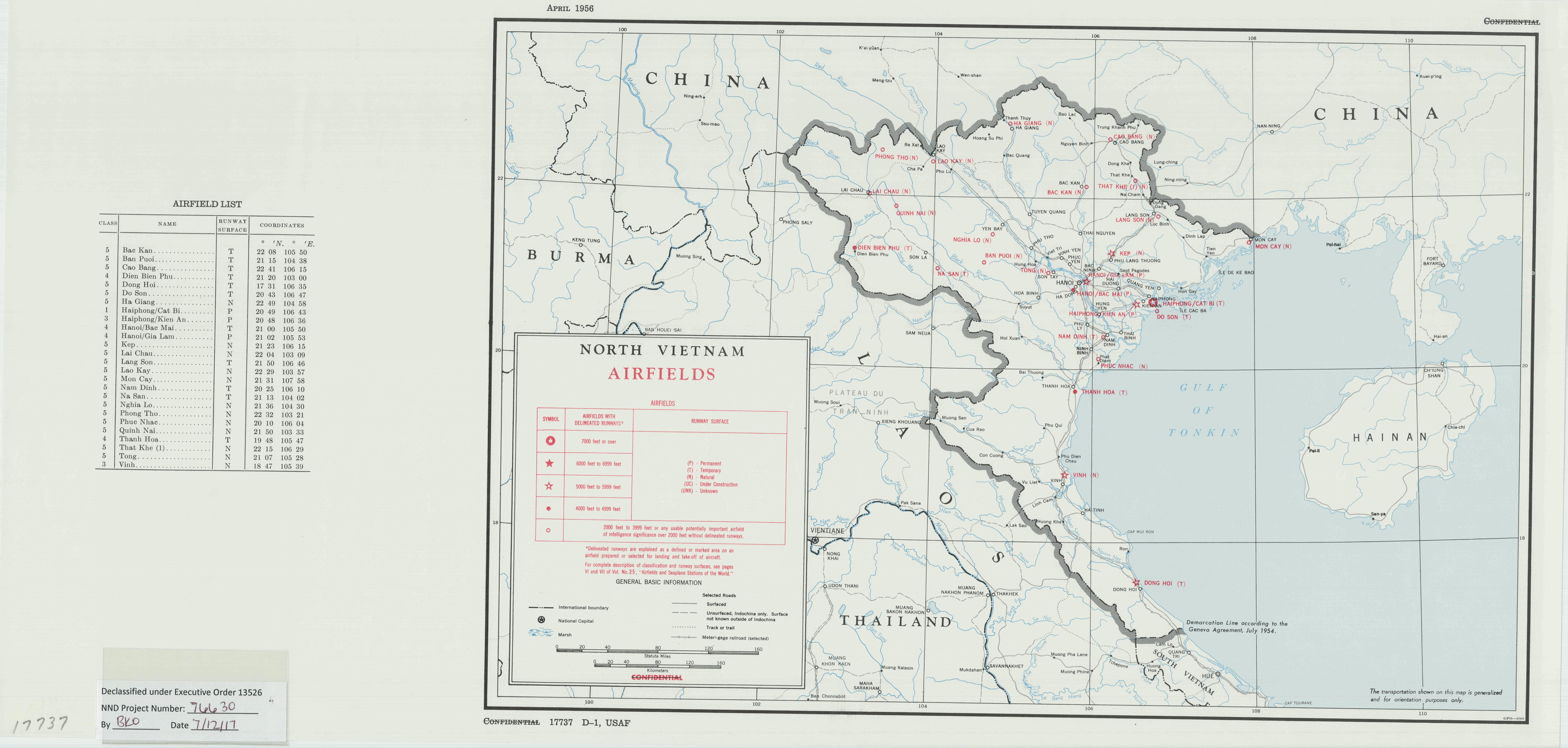
U.S. map of North Vietnamese airfields

In the spring and summer of 1972, 360 USAF fighters and 96 USN fighters, a great number of which were F-4s of recent modifications, opposed only 71 VPAF aircraft (including 31 MiG-21). The culmination of the struggle in the air was 10 May 1972, when the VPAF aircraft completed 64 sorties, engaging in 15 air battles. The VPAF claimed seven F-4s were shot down (the U.S. confirmed five F-4s were lost). However, U.S. jets managed to shoot down two MiG-21s, three MiG-17s and one MiG-19. On 11 May, two MiG-21s, which played the role of "bait", brought four F-4 to two MiG-21s circling at low altitude, the MiGs attacked the F-4s and three missiles shot down two F-4. On 18 May, VPAF aircraft made 26 sorties in eight air engagements, which cost the U.S. four F-4s; VPAF fighters on that day did not suffer losses. On 13 June, a MiG-21 unit intercepted a group of F-4s, the second pair of MiGs made a missile attack and was hit by two F-4s and did not suffer losses.

Over the course of the air war, between 3 April 1965 and 8 January 1973, each side would ultimately claim favourable kill ratios. A total of 201 air battles took place between American and Vietnamese planes in 1972 sorties. The VPAF lost 54 MiGs (including 36 MiG-21s and one MiG-21U) and they claimed 90 U.S. aircraft were shot down, including 74 F-4 fighters and two RF-4C (MiG-21s shot down 67 enemy aircraft, MiG-17s shot down 11 and MiG-19s shot down 12 enemy aircraft)

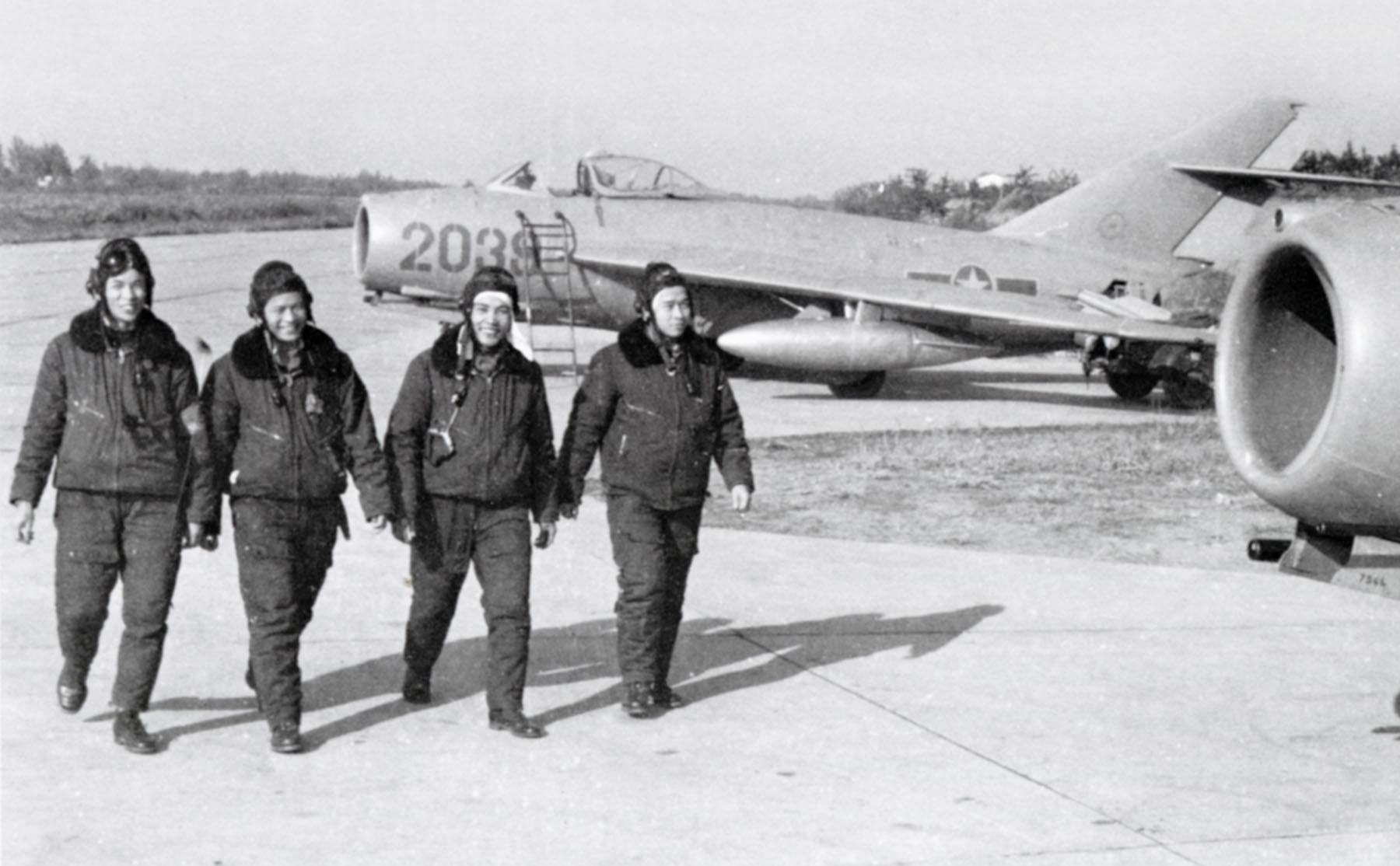
Acepilots of the 923. Fighter Aviation Regiments: Lê Huy Chao, Lê Hải, Mai Đức Toại and Hoàng Văn Kỳ. Each claiming 6 air victories.

US Navy ace Randy Cunningham believed that he shot down a Mig-17 piloted by the mythical "Nguyen Toon" or "Colonel Tomb" while flying his F-4. However, no research has been able to identify Col. Tomb's existence; Cunningham most likely downed a flight leader of the 923rd Regiment. Legend states Col. Toon had allegedly downed 13 US aircraft during his tenure. Many VPAF pilots were not only skilled but unorthodox, as Cunningham found out after making elementary tactical errors. The resulting dogfight became extended. Cunningham climbed steeply, and the MiG pilot surprised Cunningham by climbing as well. Cunningham finally forced the MiG out ahead of him and destroyed it. In fact, there wasn't any pilot in VPAF named Nguyễn Toon, he was a fictional character of the American pilots and they often made jokes with the dissertation. An invention of the American pilots, Colonel Toon was a combination of good pilots in Vietnam, like the "solo artist" lonely night bombing in World War II was called Washing Machine Charlie.

On 19 April 1972 in the Battle of Đồng Hới two MiG-17s attacked several USN warships causing minor damage to the USS Higbee. The USN claimed to have shot down one MiG with SAMs, while the VPAF claims both aircraft returned safely to base. On 22 April USN jets attacked Khe Gát Airfield, where the attack was launched from, destroying one MiG-17 on the ground and damaging a second.

There were several times during the war that the US bombing restrictions of VPAF airfields were lifted. Many VPAF aircraft were destroyed on the ground, and those that were not, were withdrawn to a sanctuary in the north west of the country or into China. In December 1972, during Operation Linebacker II the North Vietnamese air defences used their supply of SAMs trying to down the high-flying Boeing B-52 Stratofortress raids over the north. The North Vietnamese Air Defence Network was degraded by electronic countermeasures (ECM) and other suppression of Enemy Air Defences (SEAD) measures. Though the North Vietnamese forces claim over 81 U.S. aircraft shot down, (including 34 B-52s, two attributed to the VPAF),, U.S sources acknowledge only 27 aircraft lost (including 15 B-52s). During the 12 days of the Operation Linebacker II (18–29 December), during the eight air battles seven US aircraft (including four F-4s) and three VPAF MiG-21s were shot down.

After the signing of the Paris Peace Accords in early 1973 ended U.S. military involvement, the No. 919 transport air group (Lữ đoàn Không quân vận tải 919), was formed; and equipped with fixed-wing aircraft, as well as helicopters (rotor-wing) in November.

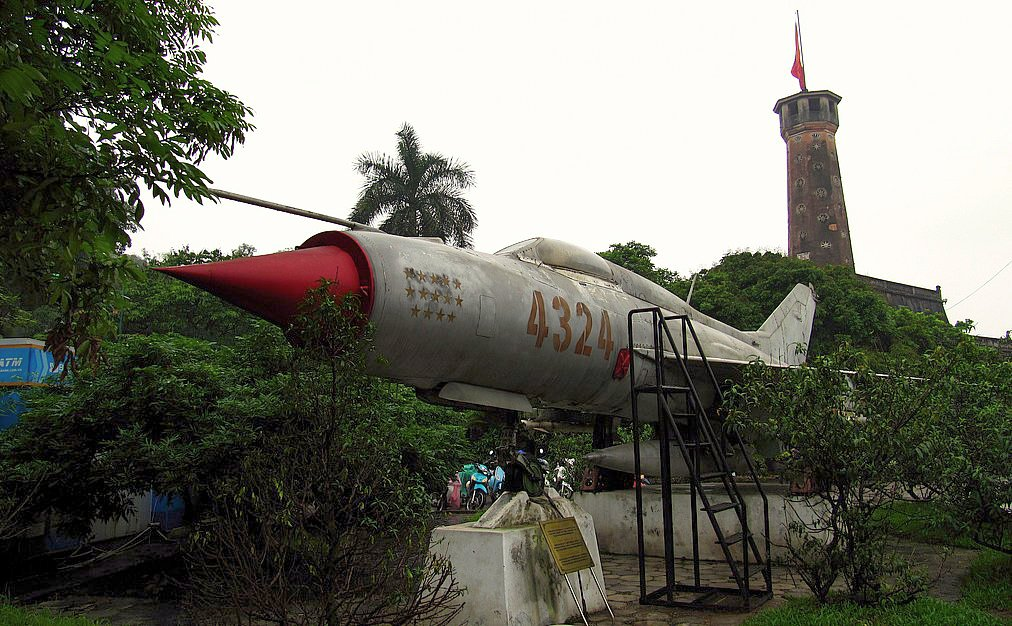
The MiG-21 N. 4324 of the Vietnam People's Air Force. This fighter aircraft, flown by various pilots, was credited for 14 kills during the Vietnam War

The VPAF did not play a major role during the Ho Chi Minh Campaign in 1975. SA-2s were transported into South Vietnam to counter possible US military air strikes, but the U.S. did not re-enter the conflict and the RVNAF did not have the capability to strike targets in the north and had a limited effect in defending against the invasion. The bombing of Tan Son Nhut Air Base, the only airstrike conducted by the VPAF, occurred on 28 April 1975, just two days before the Fall of Saigon. The operation was carried out by the VPAF's Quyet Thang Squadron, using captured Cessna A-37 Dragonfly light attack aircraft flown by VPAF pilots and RVNAF defectors led by Nguyen Thanh Trung who had bombed the Presidential Palace in Saigon, less than one month earlier before defecting to the north.

During the war, the VPAF used the MiG-17F, PF (J-5); MiG-19 (J-6), MiG-21F-13, PF, PFM and MF fighters. They claimed to have shot down 266 US aircraft and the U.S. claimed to have shot down or destroyed 204 MiG aircraft and at least six An-2s, of which 196 were confirmed with multiple witnesses/physical evidence (100 MiG-17s, 10 MiG-19s and 86 MiG-21s). However, VPAF admits only 154 MiGs were lost through all causes, including 131 in air combat (63 MiG-17s, 8 MiG-19s and 60 MiG-21s)). Using those figures, total kill ratio would be 1:1.3 to 1:2. With the number of losses to MiGs confirmed by US (121 aircraft shot down and 7 damaged), the kill ratio turns 1.6:1 against the MiGs, or 1.1:1 even accepting the VPAF's figure of only 131 in air combat. However, quite often air-to-air losses of US fighter jets were re-attributed to surface-to-air missiles, as it was considered "less embarrassing".

According to Dana Drenkowski and Lester W. Grau, the number of U.S. aircraft lost confirmed by themself is unconfirmed since the U.S. figures are also suspect. If a plane was badly damaged, but managed to land, the USAF did not count as a loss, even if it was too damaged to fly again.

=== Post-war developments ===
After the end of the Vietnam War in May 1975, more regiments were formed. No. 935 fighter regiment "Đồng Nai" and no. 937 fighter-bomber regiment "Hậu Giang" were followed by no. 918 transport regiment "Hong Ha" and no. 917 mixed transport regiment "Đồng Tháp" were created in July 1975. In September 1975, the four newly created regiments were formed into the 370th Air Division "Lê Lợi" and the 372nd Air Division "Hai Van" was formed, including among others the 925th fighter regiment.

On 31 May 1977, the VPAF (Không quân Nhân dân Việt Nam) was separated from the Air Defence Force (Quân chủng Phòng không). In 1999, the two services were re-merged, forming the current incarnation of the Vietnamese Air Force, officially named the Air Defense

When South Vietnam was overrun by PAVN forces on 30 April 1975, approximately 877 aircraft were captured. Of that number, 41 were F-5Es and 95 were A-37s. When Vietnam invaded Cambodia in 1979, former RVNAF A-37s flew most of the ground support missions. These aircraft were more suited to the role than the MiGs. Former VNAF F-5Es, C-123s, Lockheed C-130 Hercules and UH-1 helicopters were used by the VPAF for many years after the end of the war.

In the years between 1953 and 1991, approximately 700 warplanes, 120 helicopters and 158 missile complexes were supplied to North Vietnam/Vietnam by the USSR and China (primarily the MiG-19 (J-6 series). Even today, three-quarters of Vietnamese weaponry has been made in post-Cold War Russia.

The VPAF still operates late model Su-22s, aircraft of the Cold War era. However, it has recently been modernising its air force with models of the Su-27-SK air superiority fighter following closer military ties, and an array of arms deals with Russia. To date, Vietnam has ordered and received 12 of these aircraft. In 2004, it acquired four modified variants of the Su-30 MK2V, newer models of the Su-27. In May 2009, they signed a deal to procure additional 12 aircraft from the Russians to bolster their ageing fleet. The air force has also acquired new advanced air defence systems, including two S-300 PMU1 (NATO designation: SA-20) short-to-high altitude SAM batteries in a deal worth $300 million with Russia.

In June 2015, it was reported that the air force was interested in acquiring European or U.S. aircraft as part of its modernisation programme. Possible candidates included the Eurofighter Typhoon, Dassault Rafale, General Dynamics F-16 and Saab Gripen E/F.

With the lifting of the US embargo on lethal weapons exports to Vietnam, the first lethal Western arms procured were Israeli-sourced medium-range SAM-system SPYDER-MR. First deliveries began in 2016. In 2022, Vietnam reached an agreement with the United States for 12 Beechcraft T-6 Texan II trainer aircraft. In 2023, the United States opened up the possibility of F-16 sale to Vietnam following a Joe Biden visit.

In February 2022, Viettel was awarded to develop remote sensing satellites.

== Structure ==
The organisational levels of Vietnam People's Air Force, from highest to lowest are:

- Air Defence - Air Force Headquarters (Bộ Tư lệnh Phòng không - Không quân)
- Air Defence/Air Force Division (Sư đoàn Phòng không/Không quân)
- Missile/AAA/Radar/Air Force Regiment (Trung đoàn Tên lửa/Pháo phòng không/Radar/Không quân)
- Missile/AAA Battalion / Air Flight / Squadron (Tiểu đoàn Tên lửa/Pháo phòng không / Phi đội)
- Air Section/Flight (Biên đội)

=== Units ===
Air Division and Regimental Names of the VPAF Recent base information is from the Vietnamese Wikipedia VPAF article.
Division	Regiment	Name	Equipment	Base
371st Air Division (Thăng Long Division)	921st Fighter	Red Star Squadron	Su-22M4/UM3K	Yen Bai Airport
371st Air Division (Thăng Long Division)	923rd Fighter-Bomber	Yên Thế Squadron	Su-30MK2	Tho Xuan Airport
371st Air Division (Thăng Long Division)	927th Fighter	Lam Son Squadron	Su-30MK2	Kép Air Base
371st Air Division (Thăng Long Division)	916th Helicopter	Ba Vì Squadron	Mi-8, Mi-171	Hòa Lạc Air Base
371st Air Division (Thăng Long Division)	918th Air Transport	Hồng Hà Squadron	An-2, C-295M, C-212 Aviocar	Gia Lam Airport
372nd Air Division (Cửu Long Division)	929th Fighter-Bomber		Sukhoi Su-22M4	Chu Lai Airport
372nd Air Division (Cửu Long Division)	930th Helicopter		Mi-8, Mi-171	Da Nang International Airport
372nd Air Division (Cửu Long Division)	925th Fighter	Tây Sơn Squadron	Su-27SK/UBK	Phú Cat Airport
370th Air Division (Biên Hòa Division)	937th Fighter-Bomber	Hậu Giang Squadron	Su-22M4/UM3K	Thanh Son Air Base
370th Air Division (Biên Hòa Division)	935th Fighter	Đồng Nai Squadron	Su-30MK2	Biên Hòa Air Base
370th Air Division (Biên Hòa Division)	917th Mixed Air Transport	Đồng Tháp Squadron	Mi-8, Mi-171	Can Tho International Airport
361st Air Defence Division (Hà Nội Division)	218th SA Artillery	Hoa Lư Regiment	ZSU-23-4, S-75 Dvina, S-125 Neva/Pechora, 9K35 Strela-10, S-300 (missile), SPYDER	Hanoi
361st Air Defence Division (Hà Nội Division)	280th SA Artillery	Hồng Lĩnh Regiment	ZSU-23-4, S-75 Dvina, S-125 Neva/Pechora, 9K35 Strela-10, S-300 (missile), SPYDER	Hanoi
361st Air Defence Division (Hà Nội Division)	236th SA Missile	Sông Đà Regiment	ZSU-23-4, S-75 Dvina, S-125 Neva/Pechora, 9K35 Strela-10, S-300 (missile), SPYDER	Hanoi
361st Air Defence Division (Hà Nội Division)	250th SA Missile	Thăng Long Regiment	ZSU-23-4, S-75 Dvina, S-125 Neva/Pechora, 9K35 Strela-10, S-300 (missile), SPYDER	Hanoi
361st Air Defence Division (Hà Nội Division)	257th SA Missile	Red Flag Regiment	ZSU-23-4, S-75 Dvina, S-125 Neva/Pechora, 9K35 Strela-10, S-300 (missile), SPYDER	Hanoi
361st Air Defence Division (Hà Nội Division)	64th SA Missile	Sông Thương Regiment	ZSU-23-4, S-75 Dvina, S-125 Neva/Pechora, 9K35 Strela-10, S-300 (missile), SPYDER	Hanoi
361st Air Defence Division (Hà Nội Division)	293rd Radar	Phù Đổng Regiment		Hanoi
363rd Air Defence Division	240th AA Artillery		ZSU-23-4, S-75 Dvina, S-125 Neva/Pechora, 9K35 Strela-10	Hải Phòng
363rd Air Defence Division	213th SA Missile	Trần Phú Regiment	ZSU-23-4, S-75 Dvina, S-125 Neva/Pechora, 9K35 Strela-10	Hải Phòng
363rd Air Defence Division	238th SA Missile	Hạ Long Regiment	ZSU-23-4, S-75 Dvina, S-125 Neva/Pechora, 9K35 Strela-10	Hải Phòng
363rd Air Defence Division	285th SA Missile	Nam Triệu Regiment	ZSU-23-4, S-75 Dvina, S-125 Neva/Pechora, 9K35 Strela-10	Hải Phòng
363rd Air Defence Division	295th Radar		P-18M	Hải Phòng
365th Air Defence Division	228th SA Artillery	Hàm Rồng Regiment	ZSU-23-4, S-75 Dvina, S-125 Neva/Pechora, 9K35 Strela-10	Bắc Giang
365th Air Defence Division	267th SA Missile	Dien Bien Regiment	ZSU-23-4, S-75 Dvina, S-125 Neva/Pechora, 9K35 Strela-10	Bắc Giang
365th Air Defence Division	284th SA Missile	Song La Regiment	ZSU-23-4, S-75 Dvina, S-125 Neva/Pechora, 9K35 Strela-10	Bắc Giang
365th Air Defence Division	291st Radar			Bắc Giang
375th Air Defence Division	224th SA Artillery	Tô Vĩnh Diện Regiment	S-75 Dvina, S-125 Neva/Pechora	Da Nang
375th Air Defence Division	275th SA Missile	Sóc Sơn Regiment	S-75 Dvina, S-125 Neva/Pechora	Da Nang
375th Air Defence Division	282nd SA Missile	Tam Giang Regiment	S-75 Dvina, S-125 Neva/Pechora	Da Nang
375th Air Defence Division	290th Radar			Da Nang
377th Air Defence Division	591st AA Artillery	Truong Son Regiment	S-75 Dvina, S-125 Neva/Pechora, SPYDER	Cam Ranh
377th Air Defence Division	274th SA Missile	Hung Vuong Regiment	S-75 Dvina, S-125 Neva/Pechora, SPYDER	Cam Ranh
377th Air Defence Division	292nd Radar			Cam Ranh
367th Air Defence Division	93rd SA Missile		ZSU-23-4, S-75 Dvina, S-125 Neva/Pechora, S-300 (missile)	Ho Chi Minh City
367th Air Defence Division	230th SA Artillery	Thống Nhất Regiment	ZSU-23-4, S-75 Dvina, S-125 Neva/Pechora, S-300 (missile)	Ho Chi Minh City
367th Air Defence Division	261st SA Missile	Thanh Loa Regiment	ZSU-23-4, S-75 Dvina, S-125 Neva/Pechora, S-300 (missile)	Ho Chi Minh City
367th Air Defence Division	263rd SA Missile	Quang Trung Regiment	ZSU-23-4, S-75 Dvina, S-125 Neva/Pechora, S-300 (missile)	Ho Chi Minh City
367th Air Defence Division	276th SA Missile		ZSU-23-4, S-75 Dvina, S-125 Neva/Pechora, S-300 (missile)	Ho Chi Minh City
Air Force Officer's College	915th Air Training		Mi-8	Tuy Hoa Airport
Air Force Officer's College	910th Air Training		L-39C and L-39NG	Tuy Hoa Airport
Air Force Officer's College	920nd Air Training		Yak-52 and T-6C Texan II	Phan Thiet Airport
Air Force Officer's College	940th Air Training		Yak-130	Tuy Hoa Airport
26th Signals Brigade				Hanoi
28th Engineer Brigade				Hanoi
Air Electronic Warfare Battalion				Hanoi

Brigade 918 is a transport unit located at Gia Lam Airport near Hanoi.

=== Air bases ===
Vietnam Fighter Regiments

Some airbases in the south were built by the French, Japanese (World War II), United States Air Force or United States Navy for South Vietnam.

- Kép Air Base (VVKP)
- Biên Hòa Air Base (VVBH/VBH)
- Đồng Hới Airport (VVDH/VDH)
- Hòa Lạc Air Base (VVHL/VHL)
- Gia Lam Airbase (VVGL/VGL)
- Anh Son Airfield
- Thanh Son Airbase (VVPR/VPR)
- Tho Xuan Airport – (VVTX) training school for Vietnam fighter pilot.
- Truong Sa Airfield (VVSA)
- Tan Son Nhut Air Base (VVTS/SGN)
- Yên Bái Air Base – (VVYB) training school for Vietnam fighter pilot.
- Cam Ranh Airport (VVCR/CXR) – open for commercial flights in 2005
- Vũng Tàu Airfield (VVVT) operates for offshore helicopter services
- Cần Thơ Airfield – (VVCT/VCA) open and upgrade for logistic support air group.
- Phúc Yên Air Base – 921st Fighter Regiment
- Nha Trang Air Base (closed in 2009)
- Phan Thiet Airport (VVPT) - 920th Air Training Regiment

== Ranks ==
=== Commissioned officer ranks ===
The rank insignia of commissioned officers.

Rank group	General / flag officers			Senior officers				Junior officers
Vietnam People's Air Force
Vietnam People's Air Force	Thượng tướng	Trung tướng	Thiếu tướng	Đại tá	Thượng tá	Trung tá	Thiếu tá	Đại úy	Thượng úy	Trung úy	Thiếu úy

=== Other ranks ===
The rank insignia of non-commissioned officers and enlisted personnel.

Rank group	Senior NCOs		Junior NCOs	Enlisted
Vietnam People's Air Force
Vietnam People's Air Force	Thượng sĩ	Trung sĩ	Hạ sĩ	Binh nhất	Binh nhì

== See also ==
- Vietnam Naval Air Force
- Battle of Lima Site 85, (Northeastern Laos, 12 January 1968)
- Republic of Vietnam Air Force
- Vietnam People's Air Force Museum, Hanoi
- Vietnam People's Air Force Museum, Ho Chi Minh City
- Colonel Nguyen Toon
