= Korat Royal Thai Air Force Base =

Royal Thai Air Force base near Nakhon Ratchasima

Korat Royal Thai Air Force Base Camp Friendship
- Part of Royal Thai Air Force (RTAF)
- Near Nakhon Ratchasima, Thailand
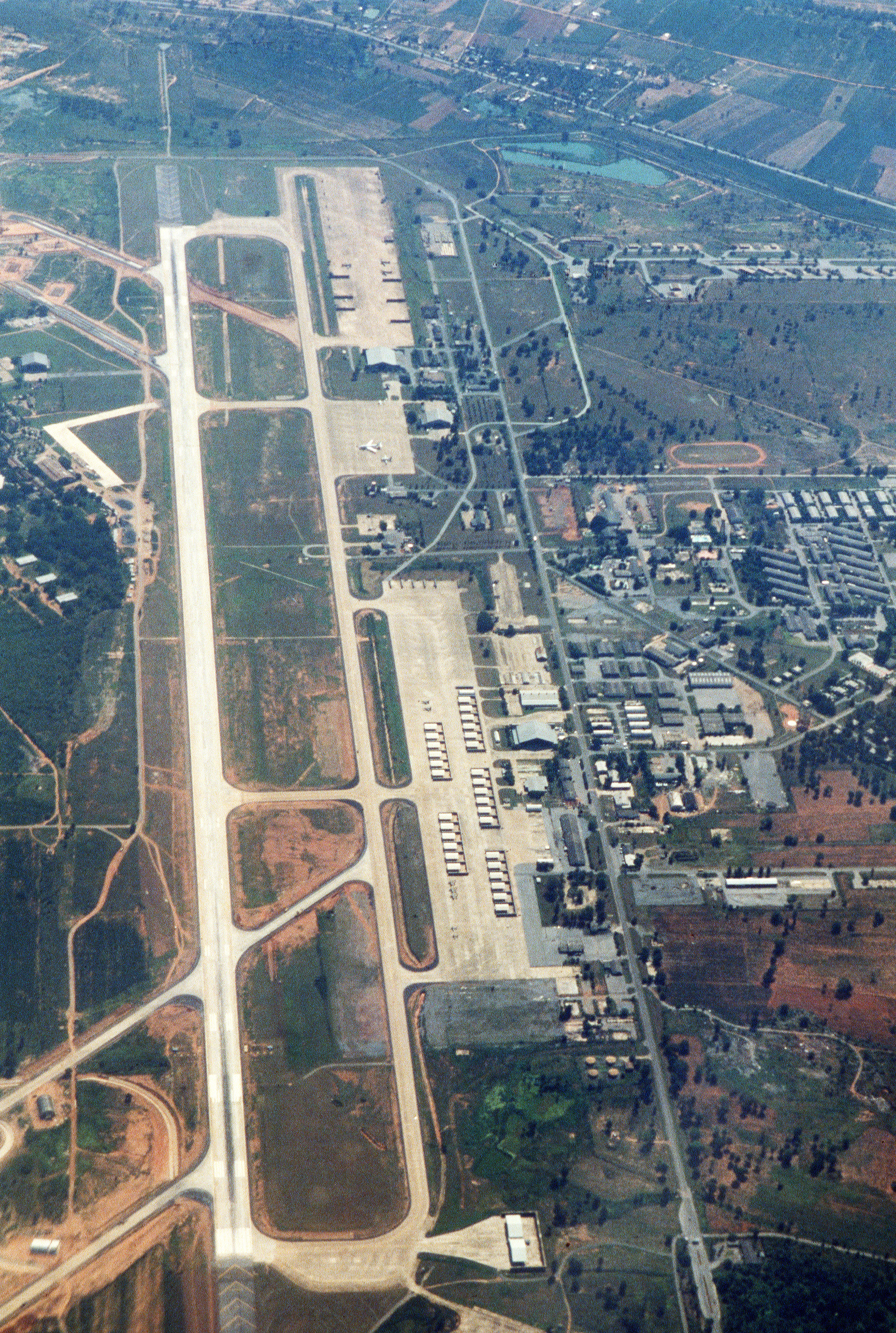
- Aerial photograph of Korat RTAFB, 23 July 1987

Site information
- Owner: Royal Thai Air Force
- Operator: Royal Thai Air Force; United States Air Force
- Controlled by: Pacific Air Forces (1964–1976); Royal Thai Air Force (1955–1964; 1976–present)

Location
- Location in Thailand
- Coordinates: 14°55′50″N 102°04′51″E

Site history
- Built: 1955
- In use: 1955–present
- Battles/wars: Vietnam War

Garrison information
- Garrison: Thirteenth Air Force (PACAF)
- Occupants: United States Advisory Forces (1964–1965); 6234th Tactical Fighter Wing (Provisional) (1965–1966); 388th Tactical Fighter Wing (1966–1976); 354th Tactical Fighter Wing (Deployed Tennant) (1972–1974); 347th Tactical Fighter Wing (Tennant) (1974–1975)

Airfield information
- Identifiers: IATA: None, ICAO: VTUN, LID: None
- Elevation: 222 metres (728 ft) AMSL
Runways
Direction	Length and surface
6/24	9,843 ft (3,000 m) Concrete

Korat Royal Thai Air Force Base or Nakhon Ratchasima Royal Thai Air Force Base is a base of the Royal Thai Air Force (RTAF) in northeast Thailand, approximately 200 km (125 mi) northeast of Bangkok and about 4 km (2.5 mi) south of the centre of the city of Nakhon Ratchasima in the Nakhon Ratchasima Province (also known as "Khorat" or "Korat"), the largest province in Thailand.

During the Vietnam War, from 1962 to 1975, Korat RTAFB was a front-line facility of the United States Air Force (USAF) in Thailand.

During the 1980s and early-1990s, the airfield was jointly operated as a civil airport for Nakhon Ratchasima. This ended with the opening of Nakhon Ratchasima Airport in the early-1990s.

== Units ==
Korat RTAFB is the home of the 1st RTAF Wing, consisting of three (101, 102, 103) squadrons. The airfield has a single 9,800 + foot runway with a single, full-length parallel taxiway.

102 Squadron flies 15 F-16A-15ADF and one F-16B-15ADF Fighting Falcon air defense airplanes acquired from the USAF and delivered to the RTAF in 2003 and 2004. These airplanes were acquired under the code name "Peace Naresuan IV".

103 Squadron flies eight F-16A and four F-16B acquired under the code name "Peace Naresuan I", five F-16A (of six delivered) under the code name "Peace Naresuan XI", and three F-16A and four F-16Bs acquired from the Republic of Singapore Air Force and delivered in late 2004. All F-16s are the block 15 version.

A detachment of 1 UH-1H Iroquois helicopters from 203 Squadron, Wing 2 is also based at Korat.

== Cope Tiger ==
Korat RTAFB is a major facility for the Cope Tiger exercises, an annual, multinational exercise conducted in two phases in the Asia-Pacific region.

Cope Tiger involves air forces from the United States, Thailand, and Singapore, as well as U.S. Marine Corps aircraft deployed from Japan. US naval aircraft have also been involved in Cope Tiger. The flying training portion of the exercise promotes closer relations and enables air force units in the region to sharpen air combat skills and practice interoperability with US forces. Pilots fly both air-to-air and air-to-ground combat training missions.

Participating American aircraft have included the A-10 Thunderbolt II, F-15C/D Eagles, F-15E Strike Eagles, F/A-18A/C Hornets, F/A-18E/F Super Hornets, F-16C/D Fighting Falcons, E-3B/C Sentry Airborne Warning and Control Systems (AWACS) aircraft, KC-135 Stratotanker aerial refueling aircraft, C-130H Hercules airlift aircraft and HH-60G Pave Hawk helicopters.

Thai Forces fly F-16A/B Fighting Falcons, F-5E Tigers and ground attack L-39's, and Alpha Jets of 231 Squadron. Singaporean forces fly F-5Es, F-16C/D Fighting Falcons, KC-130B Hercules, E-2C Hawkeye, CH-47SD Chinooks and AS-532UL Cougars.

More than 1,100 people participate, including approximately 500 US service members and 600 service members from Thailand and Singapore.

Over the last few years, Cope Tiger has widened to include CSAR (Combat Search and Rescue) assets and in 2007 for the first time RTAFB Udon Thani was also used as a base during this exercise. These included a C-130E Hercules from 36 Airlift Squadron, 374 Airlift Wing (based at Yokota AB, Japan) in 2006, and a G-222 and a C-130H from the RTAF in 2007.

Since the 1980s United States Marine Corps F/A-18C Hornet fighters have used Korat as a base during Cobra Gold exercises.

== History ==
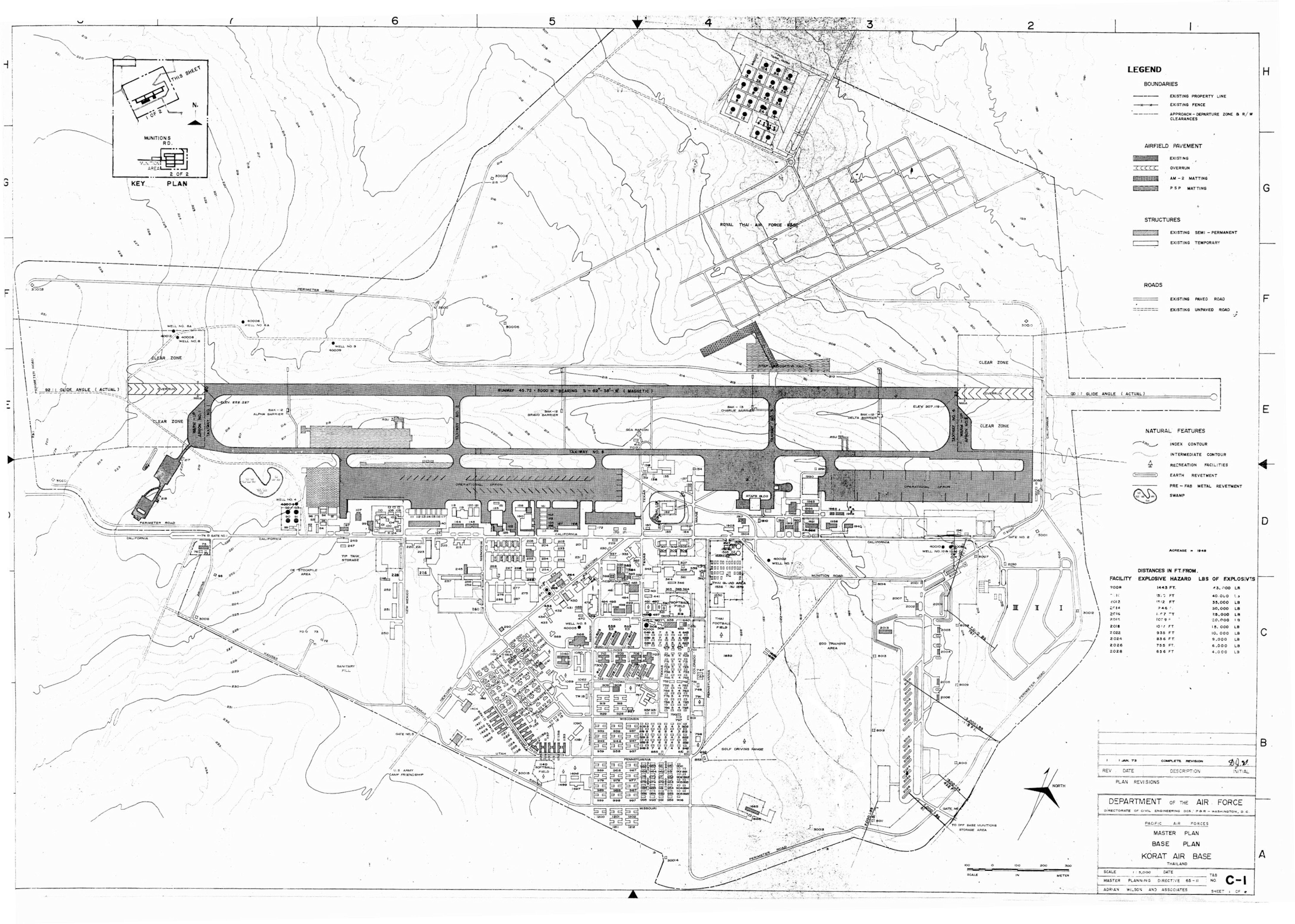
1973 map of Korat Royal Thai Air Force Base (click on map for high resolution)

The origins of Korat Air Base dates back to the Japanese Occupation of Thailand during World War II. The Japanese Army established facilities on the land later used to build Korat Air Base, and a small support airfield was established there for logistics support of the facility and for the Japanese occupation forces in the area. After the end of the war, the facilities were taken over by the Thai government as a military base. Various Japanese facilities were used by the RTAF (including the airfield control tower) until the 1960s.

In 1961, the Kennedy administration feared a communist invasion or insurgency inside Thailand would spread from the Laotian Civil War. Political considerations with regards to the communist threat led the Thai government to allow the United States to covertly use five Thai bases for the air defense of Thailand and to fly reconnaissance flights over Laos under a "gentleman's agreement" with the United States. An advisory force of Army personnel was sent to Thailand and their first reports indicated that significant infrastructure improvement in the country would be needed in order for US forces to land in the Gulf of Siam and move north to the expected invasion areas along the Mekong River between Laos and Thailand.

The United States Army Corps of Engineers were deployed and established a headquarters at the RTAF airfield that later became Korat RTAFB. The first facilities were built on the north side of the runway (14°56′22″N 102°04′59″E). They included a hospital, some barracks and some warehouses for equipment that was flown in using the existing runway. Under the agreement, United States forces using Thai air bases were commanded by Thai officers. Thai air police controlled access to the bases, along with USAF Security Police, who assisted them in base defense using sentry dogs, observation towers, and machine gun bunkers. The Geneva Accords of 1962 ended the immediate threat, but both Camp Friendship and Korat RTAFB were developed as part of the buildup of forces in Southeast Asia during the Vietnam War.

The USAF mission at Korat RTAFB began in April 1962, when one officer and 14 airmen were temporarily assigned to the existing base as the joint US Military Advisory Group (JUSMAG). The army was engaged in the construction of Camp Friendship. Once completed, army forces moved into Camp Friendship, turning the facilities north of the Korat RTAFB runway over to the Thai armed forces.

South of the existing runway, construction of a large air base was begun to support a full USAF combat wing. In July 1964, approximately 500 airmen and officers were deployed to begin construction, and the completion of essential base facilities was completed by October 1964, although due to its primitive nature, the air force living area was known for several years as "Camp Nasty" in counterpoint to the Army facility at Camp Friendship. The army retained a portion of the aircraft parking ramp for logistical support of Camp Friendship. The APO for Korat RTAFB was APO San Francisco, 96288

=== US advisory forces ===
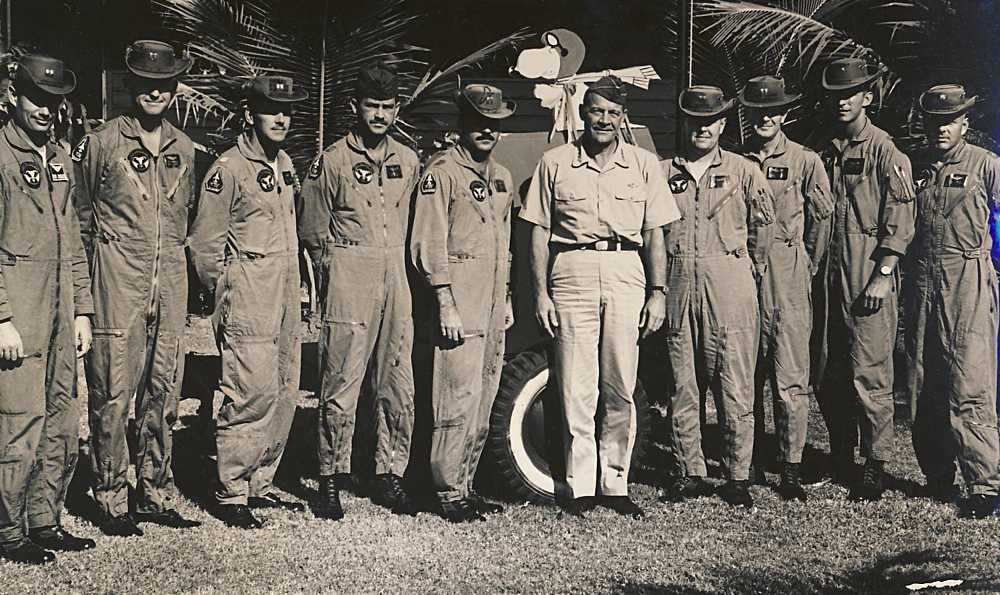
Commander-in-Chief of The Strategic Air Command General Joseph J. Nazzaro at Korat Air Force Base May 1968.

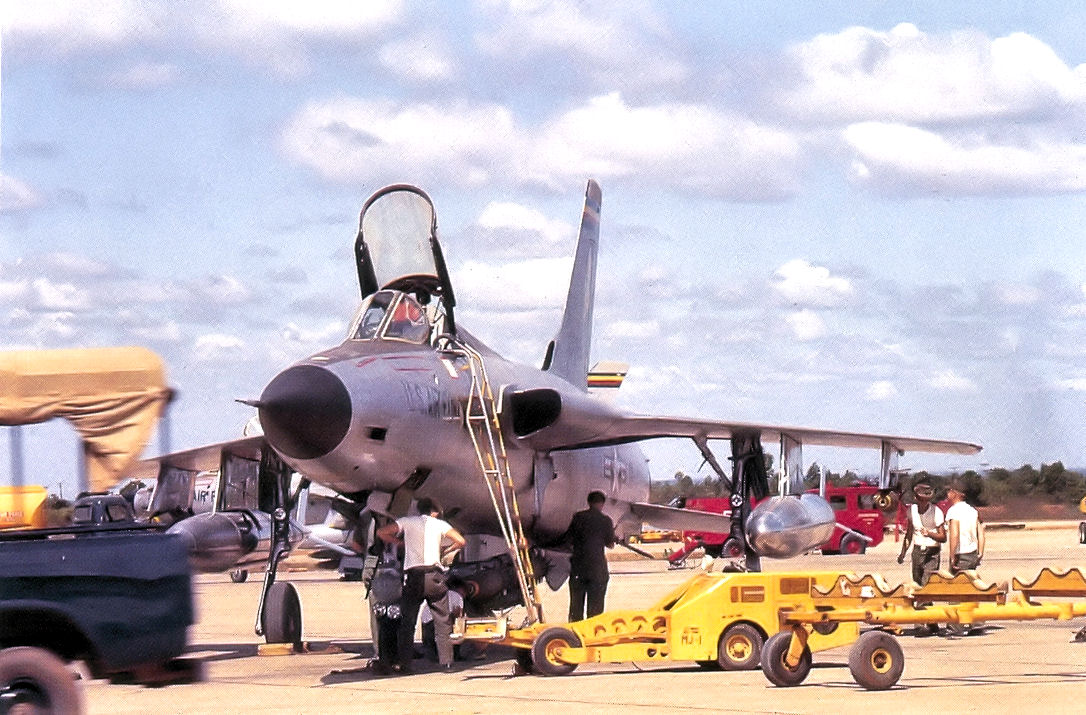
36th Tactical Fighter Squadron F-105D having MK-82 500 pound bombs being loaded prior to a mission, Korat, 1964

The first USAF units at Korat were under the command of the US Pacific Air Forces (PACAF). Korat was the location for TACAN station Channel 125 and was referenced by that identifier in voice communications during air missions. The mission of the USAF at Korat was to conduct operations in support of US commitments in Southeast Asia: North Vietnam, South Vietnam, Cambodia, and Laos. During the Vietnam War, pilots from Korat RTAFB primarily flew interdiction, direct air support, armed reconnaissance, and fighter escort missions.

In mid-June 1964 2 HU-16s of the 33d Air Rescue Squadron were deployed to Korat to act as airborne rescue control ships in support of Yankee Team bombing operations over Laos. They would remain at Korat until June 1965 when they were moved to Udorn RTAFB and then to Da Nang Air Base in South Vietnam and replaced at Korat by HC-54s.

In response to the Gulf of Tonkin Incident on 31 July 1964, the 6441st Tactical Fighter Wing at Yokota Air Base, Japan deployed 8 F-105D Thunderchiefs of the 36th Tactical Fighter Squadron to Korat on 9 August and commenced operations the following day. The 36th TFS remained at Korat until 29 October then returned to Japan. It was replaced by the 469th Tactical Fighter Squadron, also flying F-105Ds, which was deployed from the 388th Tactical Fighter Wing. From 30 October through 31 December 1964, F-105s from the 80th Tactical Fighter Squadron were deployed from the 41st Air Division, Yokota AB, Japan.

On 14 August 2 HH-43Bs were deployed to Korat to provide base search and rescue. In mid-1965 this unit was redesignated Detachment 4 38th Air Rescue Squadron.

In December 1964, the 44th Tactical Fighter Squadron deployed to Korat from Kadena AB, Okinawa. The 44th would rotate pilots and personnel to Korat on a Temporary duty assignment (TDY) basis from 18 December 1964 – 25 February 1965, 21 April–22 June 1965 and 10–29 October 1965.

The 44th TFS returned to Kadena AB, Okinawa and assignment to the 18th TFW, but on 31 December 1966, it became only a paper organization without aircraft. The high loss rate of the F-105s in the two combat wings at Korat and Takhli RTAFB required the squadron to send its aircraft to Thailand as replacement aircraft. The 44th remained a "paper organization" until 23 April 1967, when it returned to Korat, absorbing the personnel, equipment and resources of the 421st TFS.

=== 6234th Tactical Fighter Wing (Provisional) ===
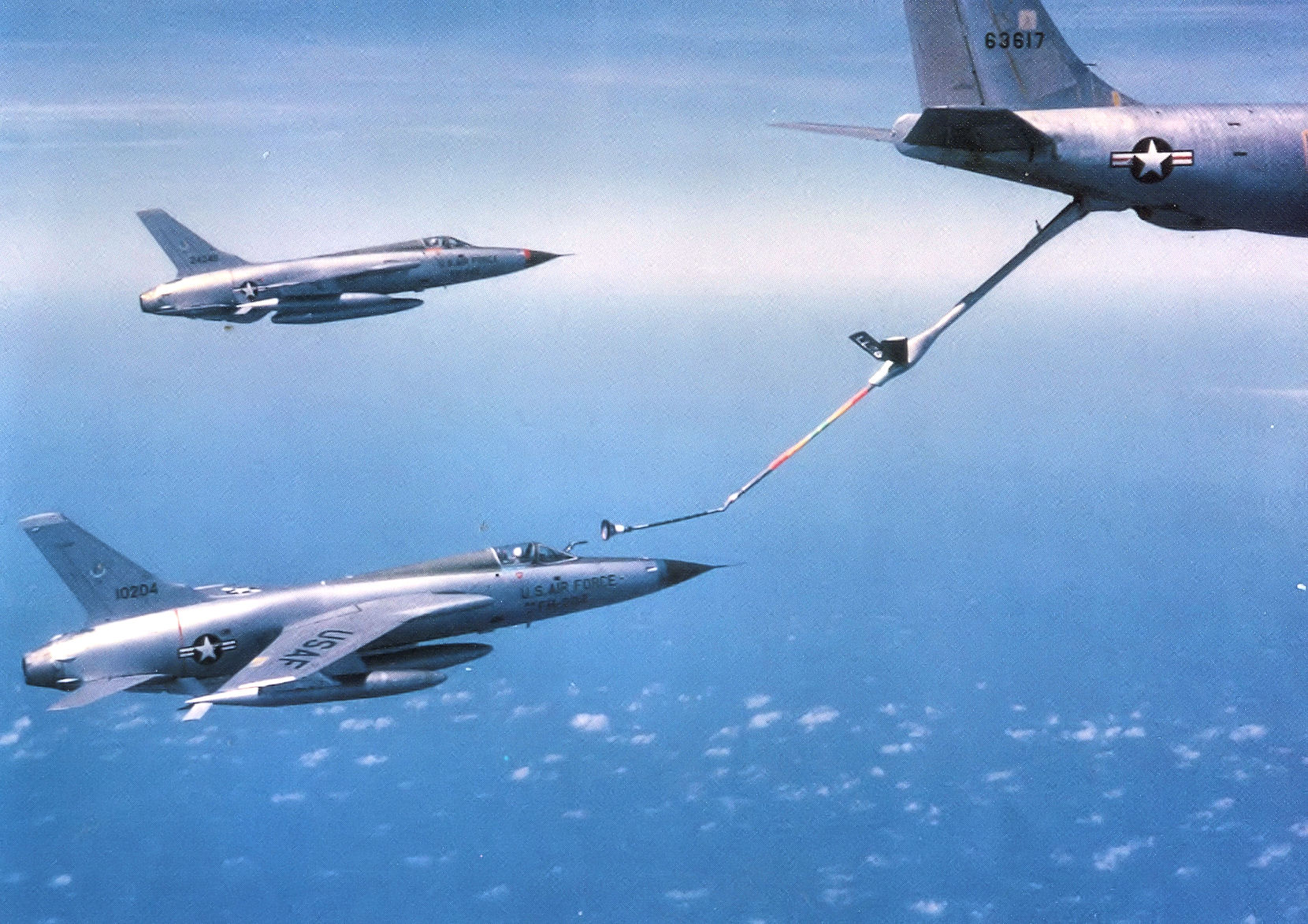
18th Tactical Fighter Wing F-105s deploying to Korat RTAFB, Thailand 1965

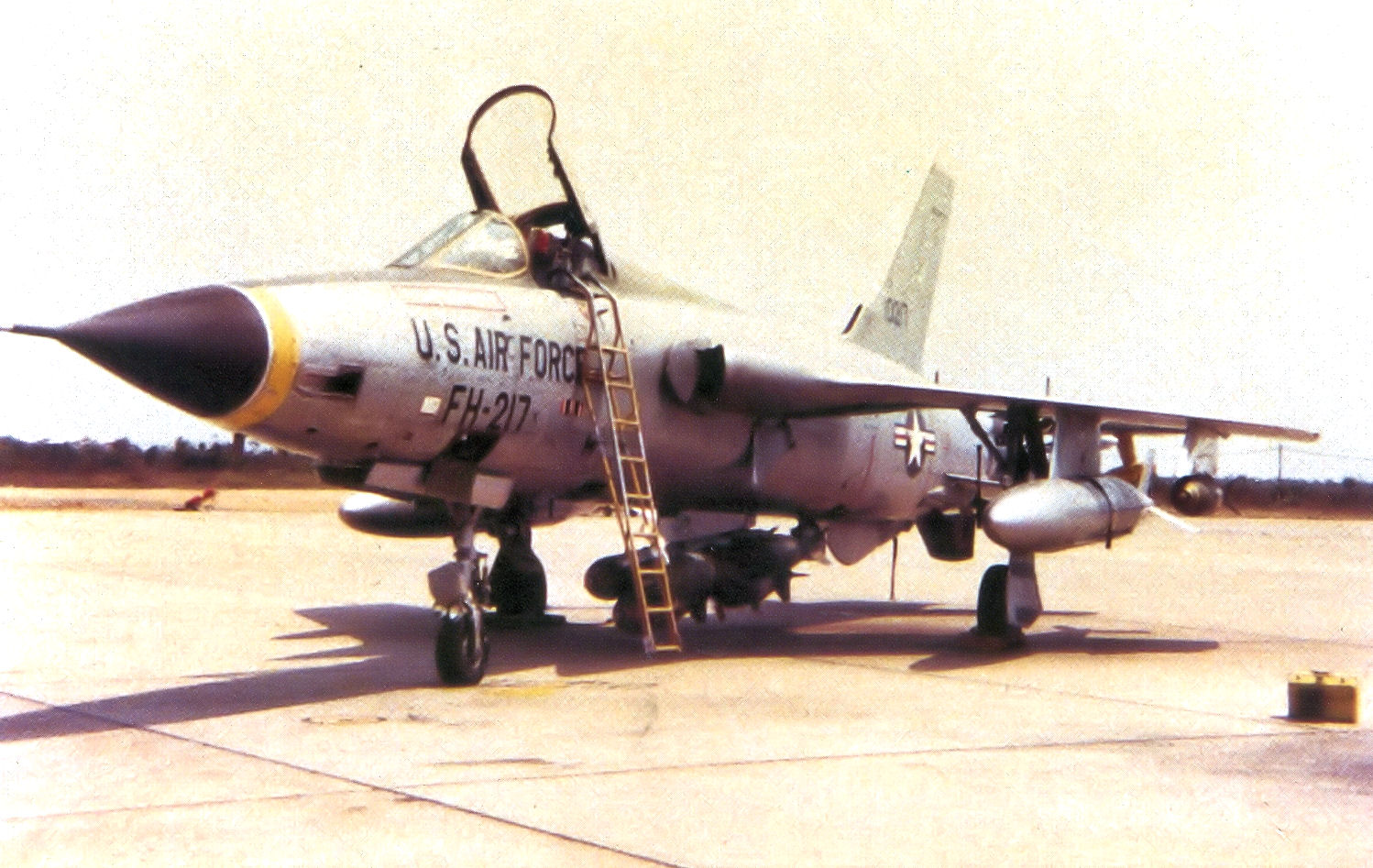
67th TFS Republic F-105D-25-RE Thunderchief 61-0217 flown by Lt Col James Robinson Risner was flying this aircraft from Korat when he was shot down by anti-aircraft artillery on 16 September 1965

In April 1965, the 6234th Air Base Squadron was organized at Korat as a permanent unit under the 2d Air Division to support the TDY fighter units and their operations. This squadron was in existence until the end of April when it was discontinued and the 6234th Combat Support Group, the 6234th Support Squadron, and the 6234th Material Squadron were designated and organized as a result of a 3 May 1965 Pacific Air Forces (PACAF) special order.

The 6234th Tactical Fighter Wing (Provisional) was activated in April 1965 as part of the 2d AD with Colonel William D. Ritchie, Jr. as commander. The wing had responsibility for all air force units in Thailand until permanent wings were established at other bases.

Known deployed squadrons to Korat attached to the 6234th TFW were:

- 67th Tactical Fighter Squadron (F-105D) February–December 1965
- 12th Tactical Fighter Squadron (F-105D) February–August 1965
- 357th Tactical Fighter Squadron (F-105D) 12 June-8 November 1965 when it was reassigned to Takhli RTAFB.
- 469th Tactical Fighter Squadron (F-105D) remained on TDY at Korat until 15 November 1965 when it was permanently assigned to the 6234th.
- 68th Tactical Fighter Squadron (F-4C Phantom II) 25 July - 6 December 1965. This was part of the first deployment of the Phantom II to Southeast Asia, with two other squadrons (47th and 431st TFS) deploying to Ubon RTAFB. The squadron specialized in NIGHT OWL (night strike and flare) tactics and this was their main mission at Korat.
- 421st Tactical Fighter Squadron (F-105D) 20 November 1965 on.
- Wild Weasel Detachment (former 531st Tactical Fighter Squadron) (F-100F Super Sabre) November 1965 – July 1966.

On 3 April 1965 the 67th TFS launched the first unsuccessful US airstrike against the Thanh Hóa Bridge.

In 1965, the 6234th TFW and its subordinate units operating F-100s, F-105s, and F-4Cs flew 10,797 sorties totalling 26,165 hours. The wing's efforts merited the Presidential Unit Citation in March 1968.

=== 388th Tactical Fighter Wing ===
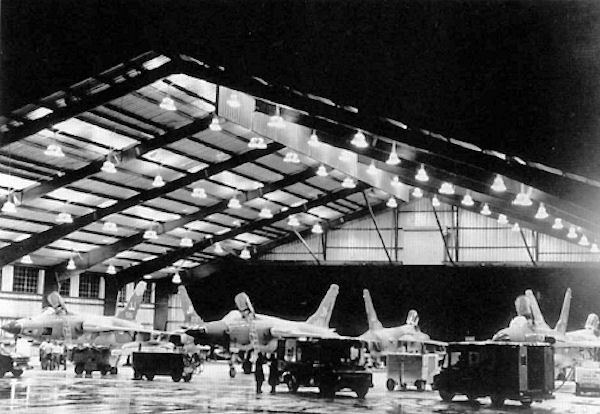
34th TFS F-105D Thunderchiefs of the 388th TFW undergo nighttime maintenance inside the big hangar at Korat in 1968. The large hangar sheltered the aircraft and its ground crews from intense tropical sunshine and heavy rains.

After a series of TDY deployments of F-105s to Korat, on 14 March 1966 the 388th Tactical Fighter Wing was activated and on 8 April was organised to replace the provisional PACAF 6234th TFW which was inactivated.

By 1967, Korat RTAFB was home to as many as 34 operating units and about 6,500 USAF airmen. Korat also housed components of the RTAF and a detachment of No. 41 Squadron RNZAF New Zealand Bristol Freighters. The annual cost for base operations and maintenance was about US$12,000,000. The monthly average expenditure for munitions was on the order of US$4,360,000.

==== F-105 Thunderchief operations ====
The 388th TFW initially consisted of two F-105 Thunderchief squadrons, the 421st Tactical Fighter Squadron and the 469th Tactical Fighter Squadron. On 15 May 1966 the 44th Tactical Fighter Squadron was permanently attached to the 388th. The 421st and 469th Tactical Fighter Squadrons flew single-seat F-105Ds, while the 44th flew the two-seat F-105F.

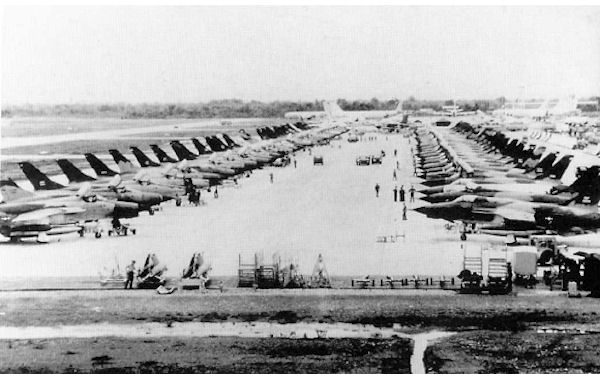
Approximately 50 F-105Ds on the flightline at Korat, 1 July 1968. KC-135s from U-Tapao are parked in the background

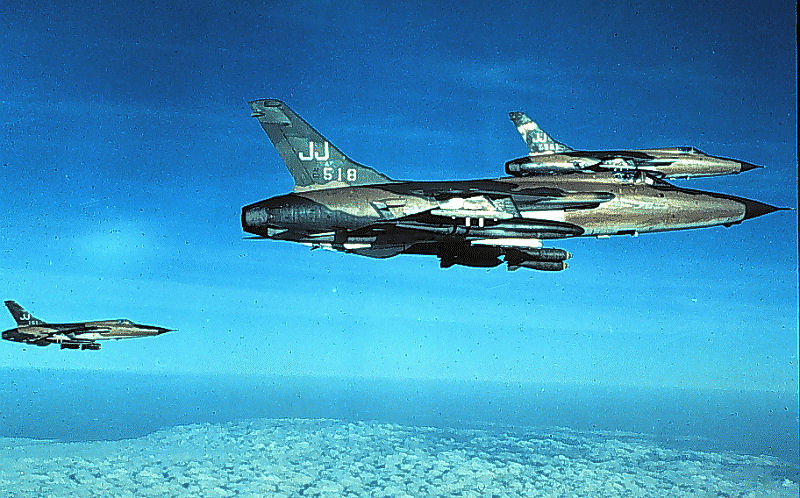
34th TFS F-105D 60-0518

Also on 15 May, an F-4C Phantom II squadron, the 34th Tactical Fighter Squadron and an F-105F squadron, the 13th Tactical Fighter Squadron were deployed and permanently attached to the 388th from the 347th TFW, Yokota AB, Japan and Kadena AB, Okinawa.

The 388th TFW lost 48 aircraft in combat during 1967. Seven others were lost due to non-combat reasons. Forty-three pilots and electronic warfare officers (EWO) were listed as killed (KIA) or missing in action (MIA). Fifteen were rescued.

In March 1967 F-105s from the 388th TFW carried out the first attacks on North Vietnam's Thái Nguyên ironworks, destroying its power plant on 16 March. On 11 August 1967 388th TFW F-105s participated in the first attack on the Paul Doumer Bridge in Hanoi which successfully destroyed one span of the bridge.

The high attrition rate of F-105Ds in Southeast Asian operations soon became a problem. The conversion of USAFE units to the F-4D Phantom enabled some of the European-based F-105Ds to be transferred to Southeast Asia, but this was not sufficient to offset the heavy attrition rate. On 23 April 1967, the 421st TFS was re-designated the 44th Tactical Fighter Squadron. In October 1967 the 44th TFS absorbed the mission and makeup of 13th TFS. The 13th was transferred to Udorn RTAFB to become an F-4D Phantom unit. Its aircraft and personnel were absorbed by the 44th TFS. With these re-organizations, the 44th TFS possessed both D and F model Thunderchiefs. The squadron's primary mission became one of flying escort to the wing's regular strike force to suppress anti-aircraft artillery (AAA) and surface-to-air missile (SAM).

On 22 December 1967 President Lyndon Johnson visited Korat RTAFB, spending the night at the base.

==== Wild Weasels ====
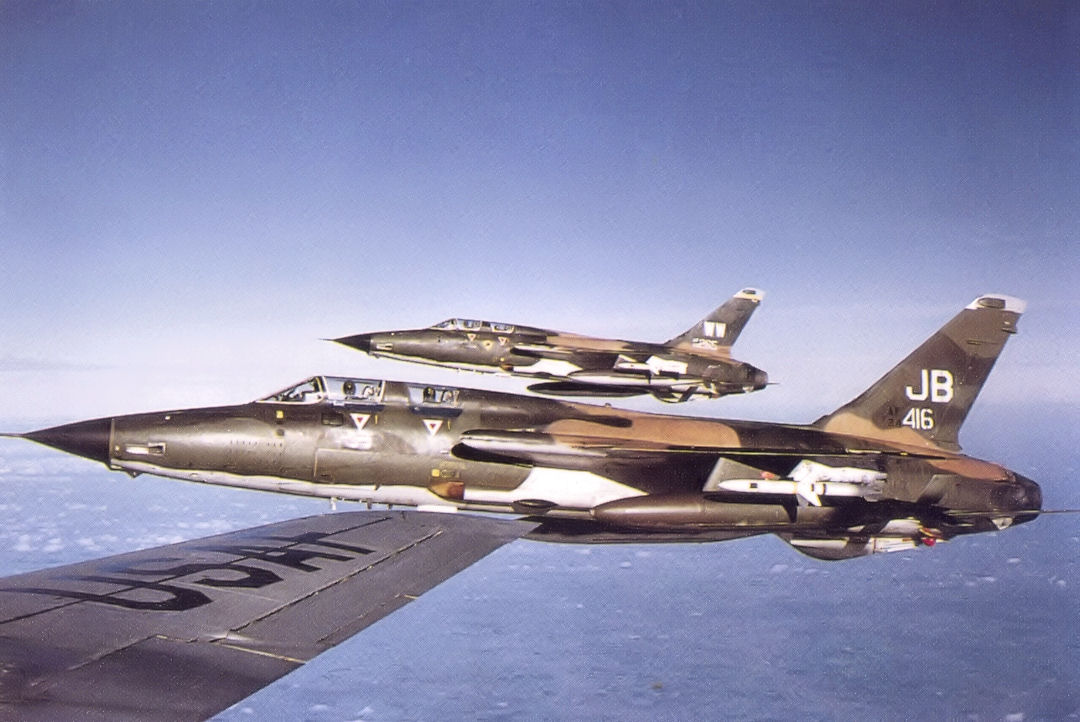
388th Tactical Fighter wing F-105F Wild Weasel aircraft, flying from Korat RTAFB, Thailand, 1972

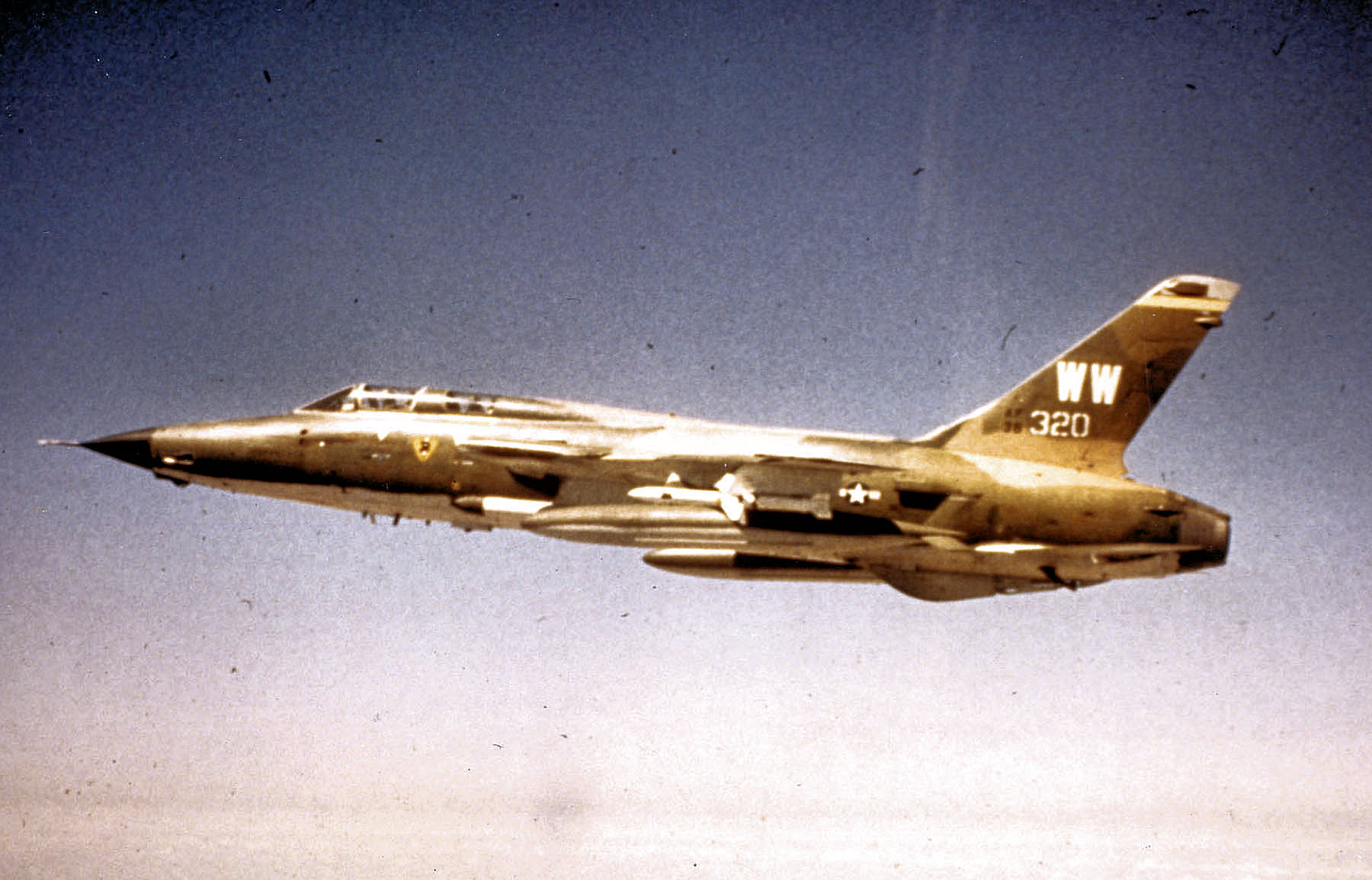
F-105G (S/N 63-8320) of the 561st Tactical Fighter Squadron, 388th Tactical Fighter Wing, over Southeast Asia in the summer of 1972. Aircraft scored three MiG kills in Vietnam

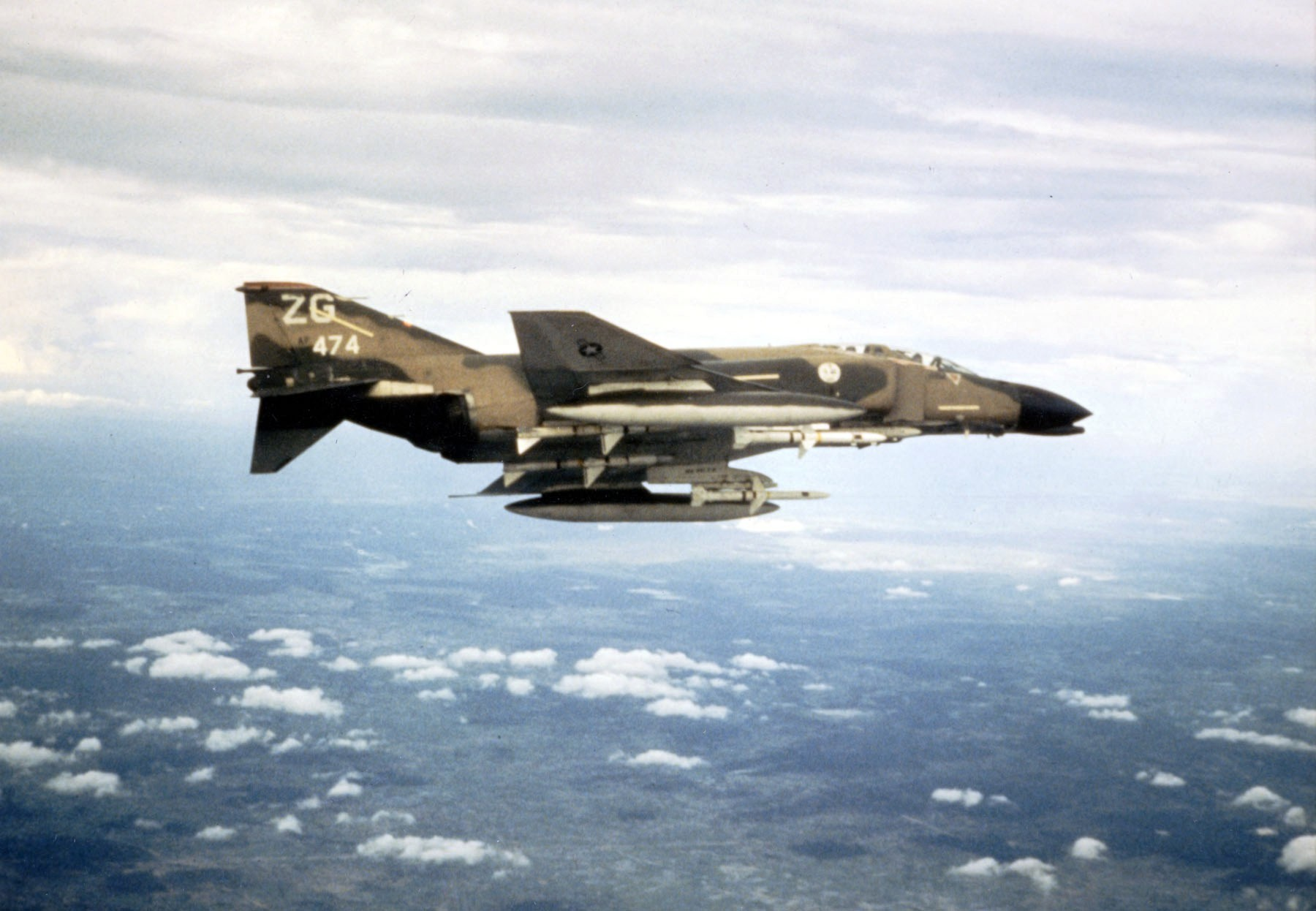
A 67th TFS EF-4C over North Vietnam, 1972

The Wild Weasel concept was originally proposed in 1965 as a method of countering the increasing North Vietnamese SAM threat, using volunteer crews. The mission of the Wild Weasels was to eliminate SAM sites in North Vietnam.

In early 1966, standard F-105Ds with no special electronic countermeasures (ECM) equipment accompanied F-100 Wild Weasel I aircraft equipped with basic ECM equipment. In general, the F-100 would identify the SAM site and the F-105Ds would fly the strike. The mission gradually evolved with the addition of new weapons and ECM equipment until the F-4 replaced the F-100 and the F-105D was replaced by the more capable and specialized two-place F-105F and G models.

F-105F/G Wild Weasel SAM Anti-Radar squadrons assigned to the 388th TFW were:

- 13th Tactical Fighter Squadron, 15 May 1966 (F-105F)

Activated at Korat, aircraft being deployed from the 41st Air Division in Japan
Inactivated October 1967, aircraft assigned to 44th TFS.
Designation reassigned to 8th TFW, Udorn RTAFB and reequipped with F-4Ds.

- Detachment 1, 12th Tactical Fighter Squadron

Formed with F-105Fs transferred from inactivating 333d, 354th and 357th TFS at Takhli RTAB 24 September 1970, aircraft at Korat in TDY status from 18th TFW, Kadena AB, Okinawa
Re-designated: 6010th Wild Weasel Squadron and PCS to 388th TFW: 1 November 1970
Re-designated: 17th Wild Weasel Squadron: 1 December 1971 – 15 November 1974
F-105G November 1970 – December 1974

- Detachment 1, 561st Tactical Fighter Squadron

TDY from George Air Force Base California, F-105G, 2 January – 5 September 1973

The tactics employed on the Iron Hand missions were primarily designed to suppress the SA-2 SAM and gun-laying radar defenses of North Vietnam during the ingress, attack, and egress of the main strike force. In the suppression role, AGM-45 Shrike missiles were employed to destroy, or at least harass, the SA-2 and/or fire control radar which guided the SA-2 missiles.

On 23 April 1967 the 44th TFS's primary mission became one of flying escort to the wing's regular strike force to suppress AAA and SAM fire as a Wild Weasel squadron.

The 12th TFS was equipped with the F-105G and was temporarily reassigned to Takhli in June 1967. The detachment returned to its main unit at Korat and the 44th TFS was returned to Korat in September 1970 from the 355th TFW to the 388th TFW when the decision was made to consolidate the units of the Wild Weasel mission. With their return, the 6010th Wild Weasel Squadron was formed. The squadron was redesignated the 17th Wild Weasel Squadron on 1 December 1971.

In February 1972, the 67th TFS returned on temporary duty to Korat from Kadena AB, this time being equipped with the EF-4C aircraft. The EF-4C was the initial Wild Weasel version of the Phantom. It was a modified version of the F-4C, designed in parallel with the F-105G Wild Weasel program. The EF-4Cs suffered from certain deficiencies which limited their combat effectiveness. For example, they were unable to carry the standard ARM. Consequently, the EF-4C was seen only as an interim Wild Weasel aircraft, pending the introduction of a more suitable type. In February 1973, after the end of combat operations in Vietnam, the 67th TFS with its EF-4C Wild Weasels were withdrawn and returned to Kadena.

==== F-4 Phantom II operations ====
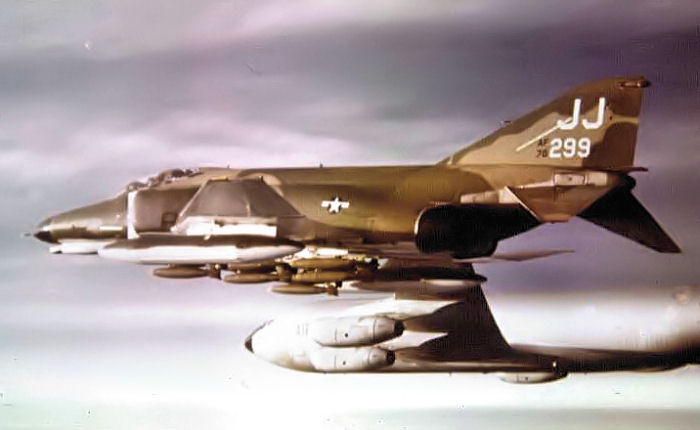
McDonnell F-4E-32-MC Phantom of the 34th Tactical Fighter Squadron

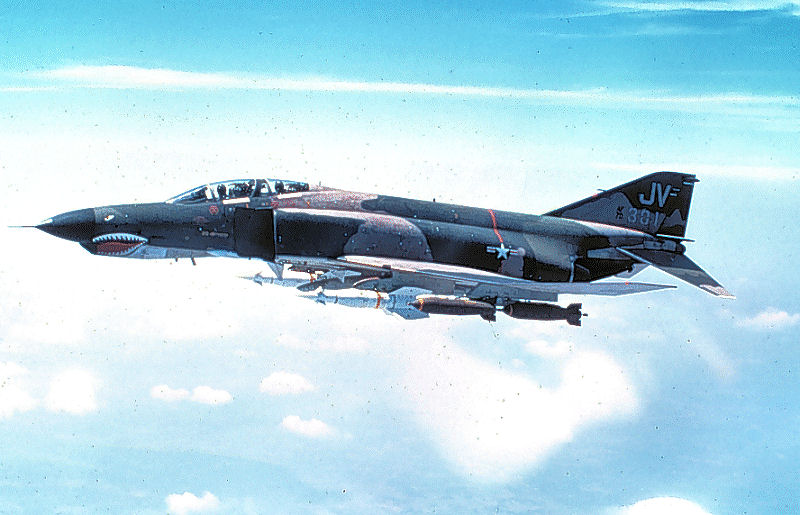
469th TFS McDonnell F-4E Phantom 66–301

In mid-1968 it was decided to make the 388th an F-4 wing, and also to equip the 388th with the new F-4E and the F-105s would be transferred to Takhli and all of the F-105s in the fighter-bomber mission would be consolidated there. The Wild Weasels would remain at Korat along with the F-4s in their specialized mission.

On 17 November 1968, an F-4E squadron from Eglin AFB, Florida, replaced the single-seat F-105D Thunderchiefs of the 469th TFS. The new Phantom squadron, the first E-models in Thailand, retained the designation 469th TFS.

On 10 May 1969, the 34th Tactical Fighter Squadron was transferred organizationally to the 347th TFW at Yokota AB, Japan, but it remained attached to the 388th TFW at Korat. It was re-equipped with F-4Es on 5 July.

On 15 October 1969, the F-105-equipped 44th Tactical Fighter Squadron was transferred and reassigned to the 355th TFW at Takhli RTAFB.

On 12 June 1972, the 35th Tactical Fighter Squadron flying F-4Ds was deployed from the 3rd TFW, Kunsan Air Base, South Korea, in a "Constant Guard" redeployment to support operations over North Vietnam during Operation Linebacker. They remained until 10 October 1972 when they returned to Korea.

==== College Eye Task Force ====
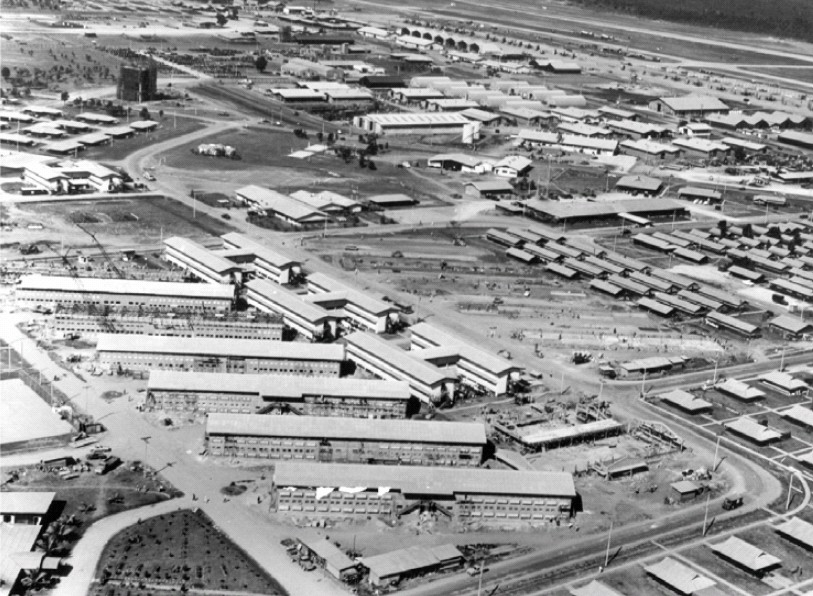
The College Eye facilities at Korat

An expansion of combat operations from Korat initiated with the arrival of EC-121 Warning Stars of the College Eye Task Force (later designated Det 1, 552d Airborne Early Warning and Control Wing) from Ubon RTAFB and EC-121R Batcats of the 553rd Reconnaissance Wing. The initial College Eye support team personnel arrived at Korat on 20 September 1967. Less than a month later, on 17 October the first seven EC-121D aircraft redeployed from Ubon, followed two days later by the arrival of the Batcat EC-121Rs.

The EC-121Ds provided airborne radar coverage and surveillance in support of aircraft flying combat operations. Combat reconnaissance missions of the 552d resumed on 25 November 1967. These missions normally required the aircraft to be on station for eight hours. Including transit time to and from station, an average flight was typically about 10 hours, and the force ranged between five and seven aircraft at any one time.

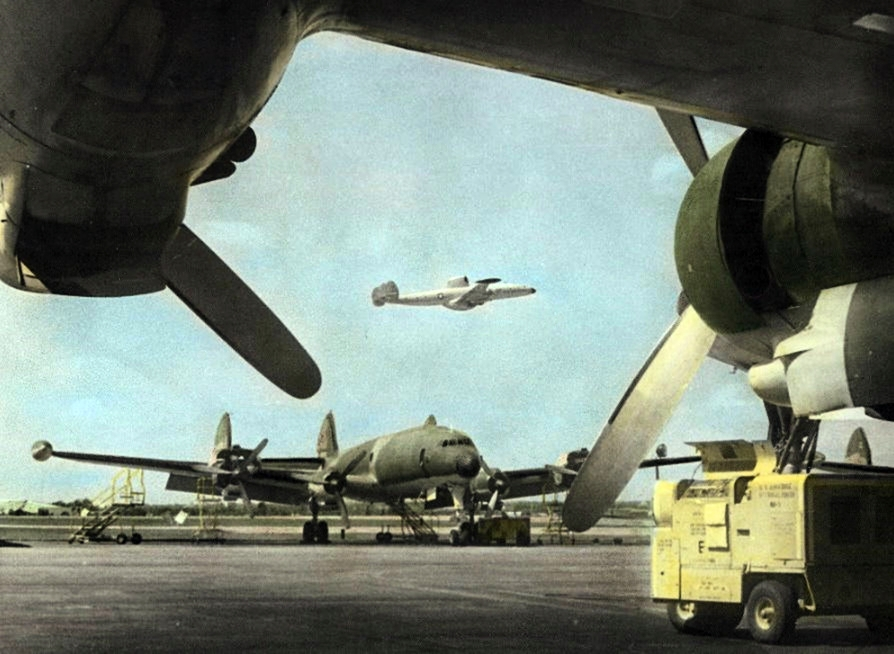
A College Eye EC-121D takes off from Korat with a Batcat EC-121R in the foreground

The mission of the 20 EC-121Rs was to detect and interdict the flow of supplies from North Vietnam down the Ho Chi Minh Trail to the People's Army of Vietnam and Viet Cong forces in South Vietnam. Their primary objective was to create an anti-vehicle barrier. If the vehicles could be stopped, then a major quantity of enemy supplies would be halted.

In November 1970, the 553d RW was inactivated. The 554th RS transferred to Nakhon Phanom RTAFB to operate QU-22 Baby Bats, while the 553rd RS remained at Korat with 11 Batcats until December 1971, when it returned to Otis AFB, Massachusetts.

Det. 1 remained at Korat until June 1970, when it left Thailand. It returned in November 1971, now known as Disco, after North Vietnamese MiGs threatened B-52s and other aircraft operating in southern Laos. It remained at Korat, supporting Operation Linebacker, Operation Linebacker II and other USAF operations, until 1 June 1974, when it returned to McClellan AFB, California.

==== B-66 Destroyer operations ====
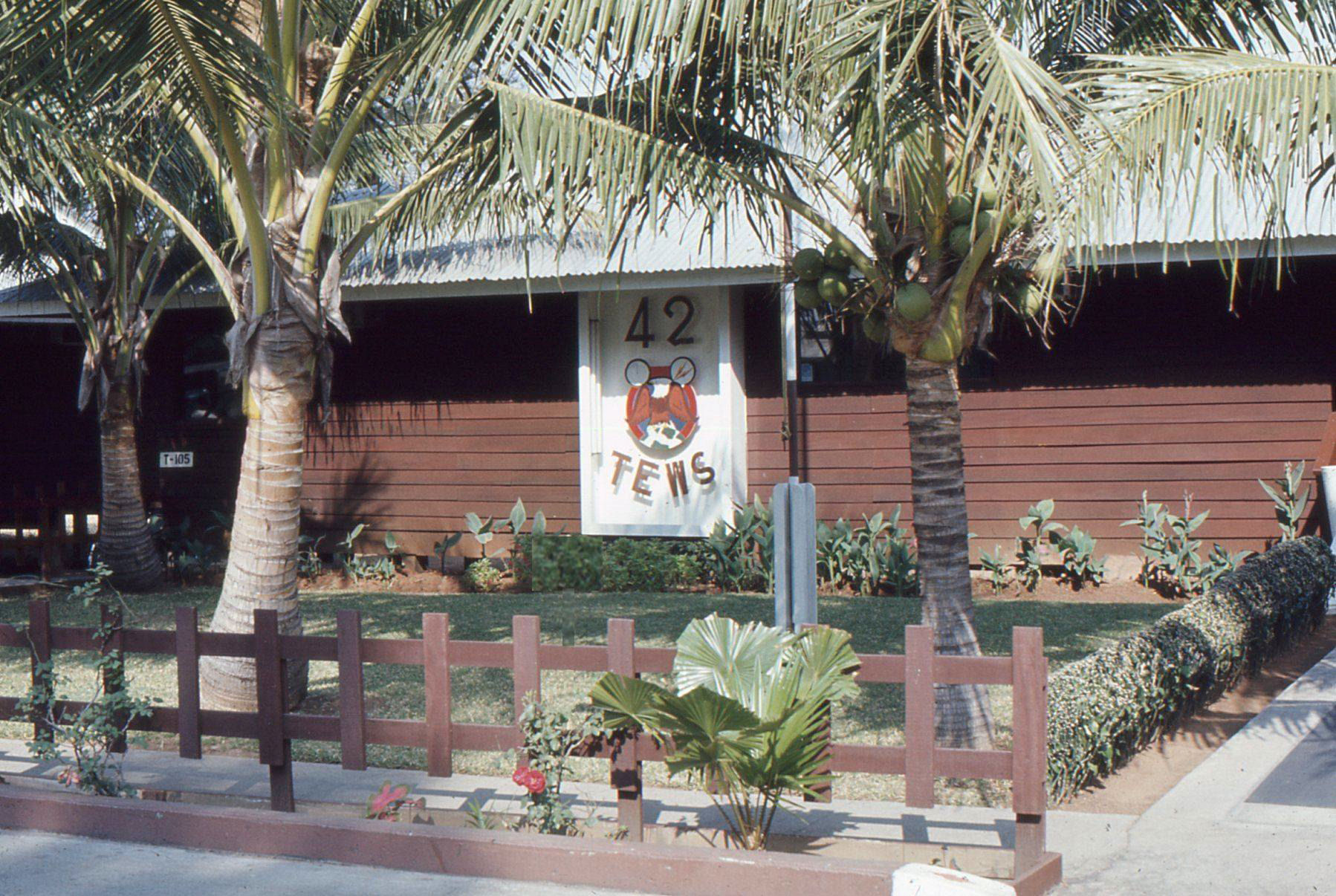
Headquarters of the 42d Tactical Electronic Warfare Squadron

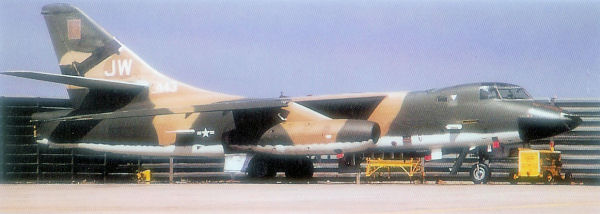
Douglas RB/EB-66B-DL Destroyer of 42d Tactical Electronic Warfare Squadron

EB-66s were transferred to Takhli RTAFB in late November 1965 and were used as electronic warfare aircraft, joining strike aircraft during their missions over North Vietnam to jam enemy radar installations. They were not Wild Weasel aircraft, since they did not have the means to attack radar installations directly.

In September 1970, the 42nd Tactical Electronic Warfare Squadron, which flew EB-66s, transferred to Korat from Takhli. The EB-66C/E flew radar and communications jamming missions to disrupt enemy defenses and early warning capabilities.

On 2 April 1972, an EB-66C Bat 21 was shot down over South Vietnam near the Vietnamese Demilitarized Zone during the Easter Offensive. Lt Col. Iceal Hambleton was the only crewmember able to eject, which set into motion an 11 1/2-day search and rescue operation.

==== Airborne command and control mission ====
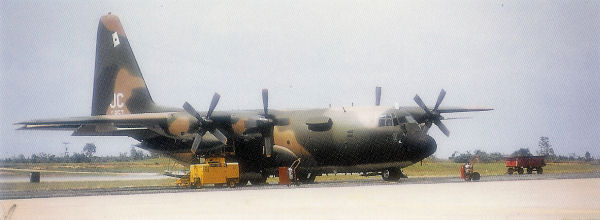
Lockheed C/EC-130E-LM Hercules Serial 62-1857 of the 7th ACCS at Korat, 10 May 1974

On 30 April 1972 the 7th Airborne Command and Control Squadron (ACCS) was assigned to the 388th TFW from Udon RTAFB and began flying missions in its EC-130E Hercules aircraft, which were equipped with command and control capsules.

The 7th ACCS played an important role in the conduct of air operations. The squadron had a minimum of two aircraft airborne 24 hours a day directing and coordinating the effective employment of tactical air resources throughout Southeast Asia. Its aircraft functioned as a direct extension of ground-based command and control authorities, the primary mission was providing flexibility in the overall control of tactical air resources. In addition, to maintain positive control of air operations, the 7th ACCS provided communications to higher headquarters. The battle staff was divided into four functional areas: command, operations, intelligence, and communications. Normally, it included 12 members working in nine different specialties. Radio call signs for these missions were Moonbeam, Alleycat, Hillsboro and Cricket.

==== A-7D Corsair II ====
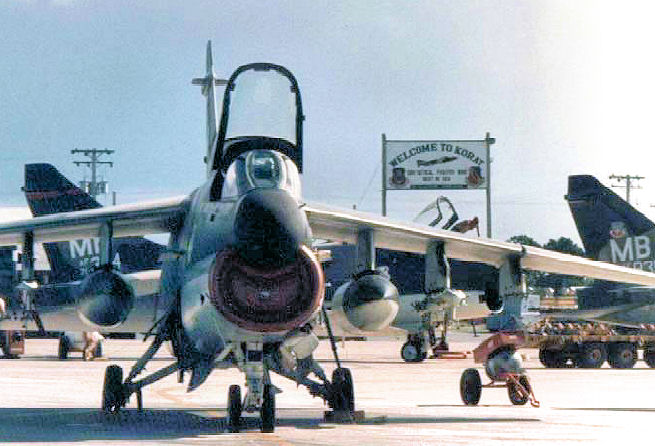
A-7Ds of the 354th Tactical Fighter Wing at Korat, 1972

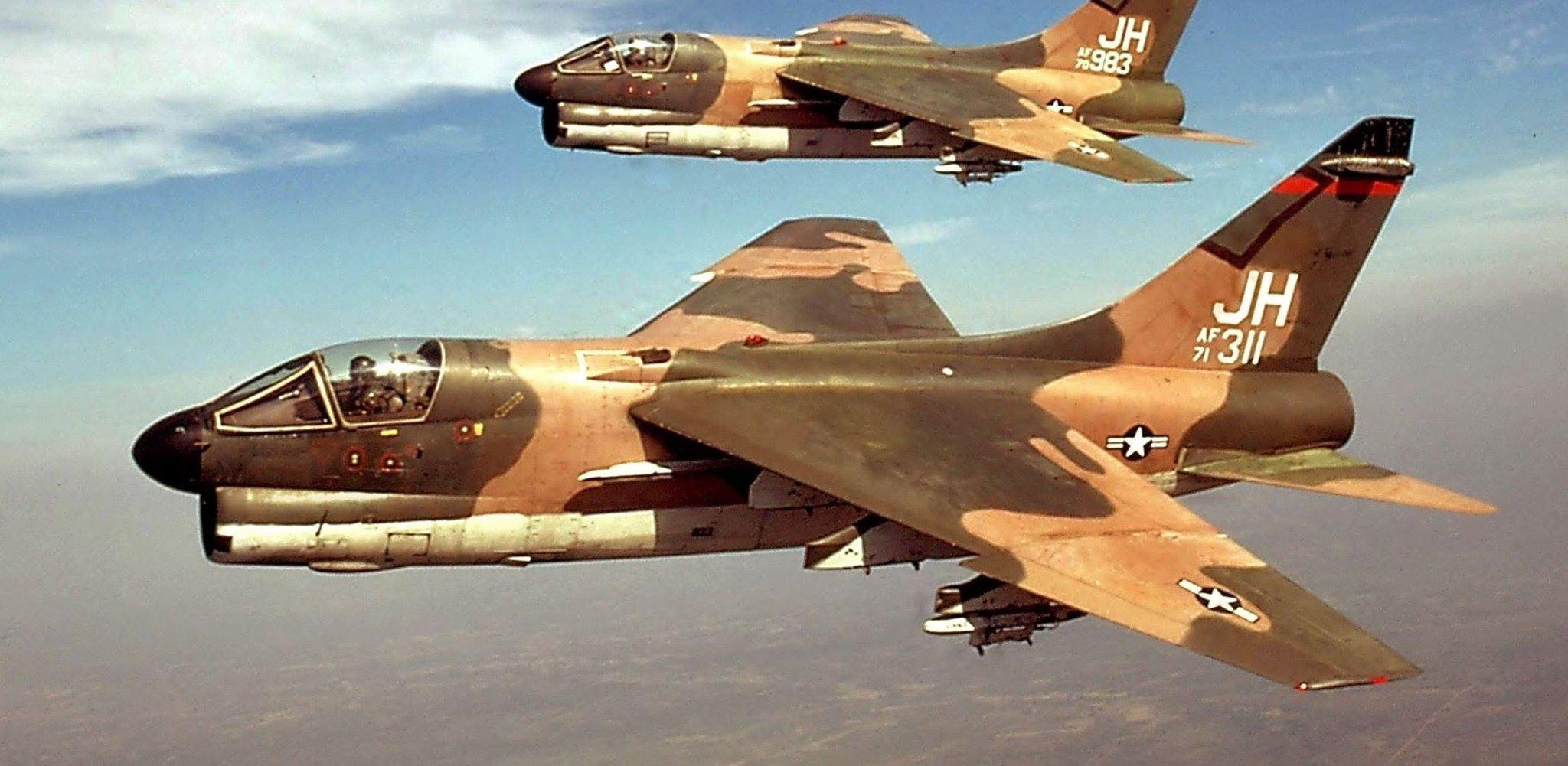
3d Tactical Fighter Squadron A-7D Corsair II 70-0983 and 71-0311 in flight

On 29 September 1972, the 354th Tactical Fighter Wing, based at Myrtle Beach AFB South Carolina, deployed 72 A-7D Corsair II of the 353rd, 354th, 355th and the 356th Tactical Fighter Squadrons to Korat for a 179-day TDY. By mid-October, 1,574 airmen from Myrtle Beach had arrived as part of "Constant Guard IV".

In addition to strike missions during Operations Linebacker and Linebacker II, A-7Ds of the 354th assumed the combat search and rescue "Sandy" role from the A-1 Skyraider in November 1972 when the remaining Skyraiders were transferred to the Republic of Vietnam Air Force.

In March 1973 A-7D aircraft were drawn from the deployed 354th TFW squadrons and assigned to the 388th TFW as the 3d Tactical Fighter Squadron. Some TDY personnel from the 354th TFW were assigned to the 388th and placed on permanent party status.

The 354th TFW Forward Echelon at Korat also became a composite wing. Along with the Myrtle Beach personnel, elements of the 355th Tactical Fighter Wing from Davis-Monthan AFB Arizona were deployed to support the A-7D aircraft, being replaced by A-7Ds from the 23d Tactical Fighter Wing from England AFB. These airmen rotated on 179-day assignments (the limit for TDY assignments) to Korat from these continental United States bases until early 1974.

In March 1972 the 39th Aerospace Rescue and Recovery Squadron moved to Korat from Cam Ranh Air Base. The unit was dissolved on 1 April being temporarily redesignated Detachment 4, 3rd Aerospace Rescue and Recovery Group before being redesignated as the 56th Aerospace Rescue and Recovery Squadron on 8 July and absorbing the HH-43 detachment at Korat.

==== 1973 operations in Laos and Cambodia ====
The Paris Peace Accords were signed on 27 January 1973 by the governments of North Vietnam, South Vietnam, and the United States with the intent to establish peace in Vietnam. The accords effectively ended United States military operations in North and South Vietnam. Laos and Cambodia, however, were not signatories to the Paris agreement and remained in states of war.

The US was helping the Royal Lao Government achieve whatever advantage possible before working out a settlement with the Pathet Lao and their allies. The USAF flew 386 combat sorties over Laos during January and 1,449 in February 1973. On 17 April, the USAF flew its last mission over Laos, attacking a handful of targets requested by the Laotian government.

In Cambodia the USAF carried out a massive bombing campaign to prevent the Khmer Rouge from taking over the country.

Congressional pressure in Washington grew against these bombings, and on 30 June 1973, the United States Congress passed Public law PL 93-50 and 93-52, which cut off all funds for combat in Cambodia and all of Indochina effective 15 August 1973. Air strikes by the USAF peaked just before the deadline, as the Khmer National Armed Forces engaged a force of about 10,000 Khmer Rouge encircling Phnom Penh.

At 11:00 15 August 1973, the Congressionally-mandated cutoff went into effect, bringing combat activities over the skies of Cambodia to an end. A-7 and F-4s from Korat flew strike missions sometimes less than 16 km (10 mi) from Phnom Penh that morning before the cutoff. The final day marked the conclusion of an intense 160-day campaign, during which the USAF expended 240,000 tons of bombs. At Korat, two A-7D pilots from the 354th TFW returned from flying the last USAF combat mission over Cambodia.

==== Consolidation and inactivation ====
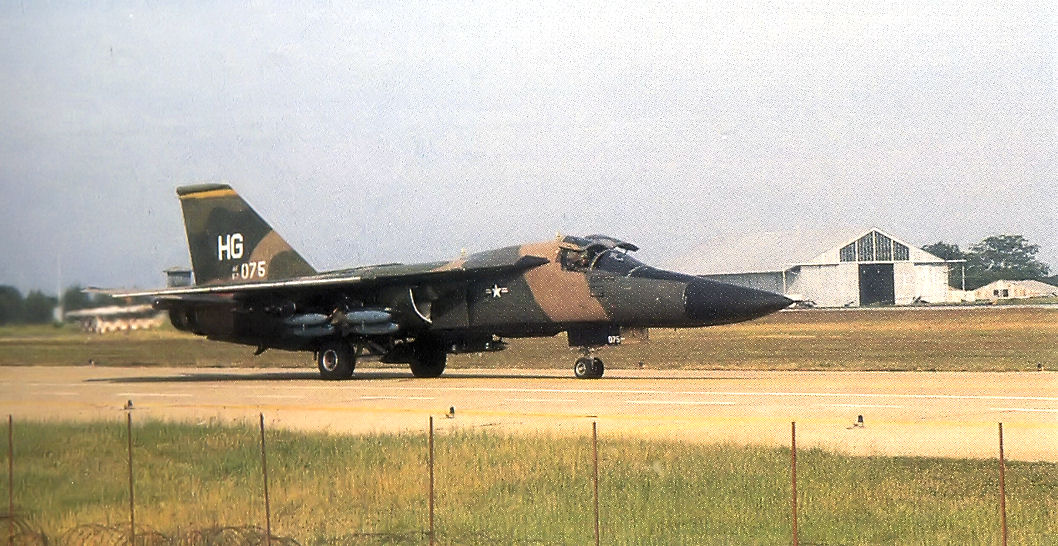
428th Tactical Fighter Squadron General Dynamics F-111A 67-0075 carrying practice bombs taxiing at Korat RTAFB, Thailand, September 1974

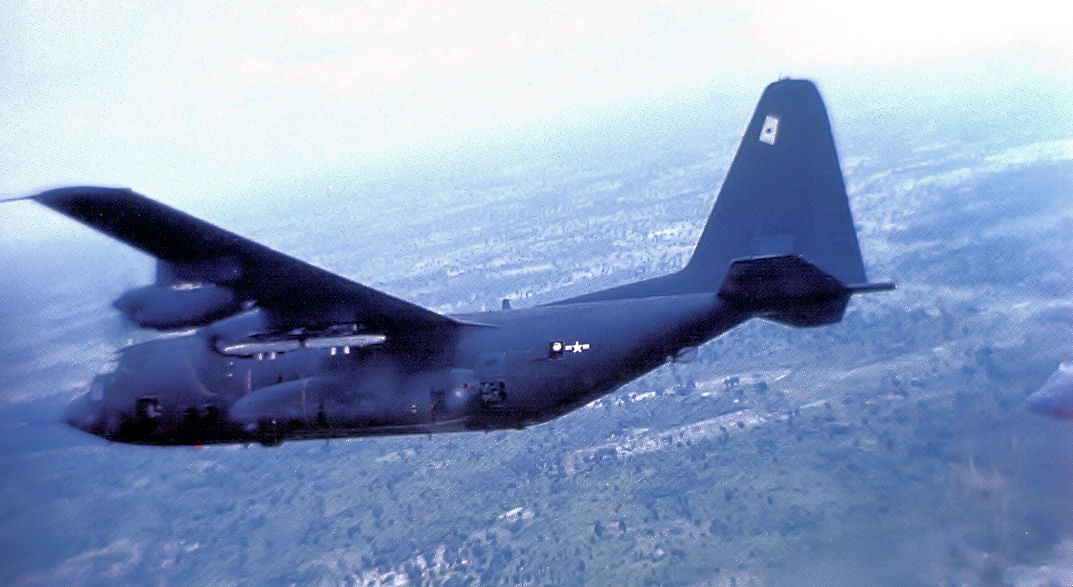
AC-130 Spectre gunship of the 16th Special Operations Squadron flying from Korat RTAFB, Thailand, July 1974

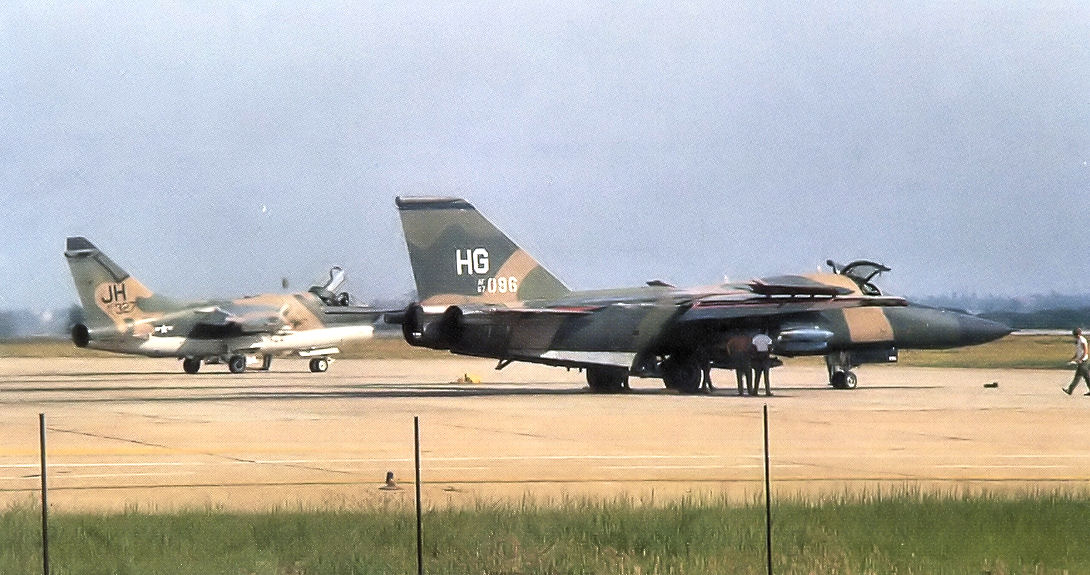
Korat RTAFB A-7D F-111 on Alert Ramp during SS Mayaguez Operation, May 1975

With the end of active combat in Indochina on 15 August 1973, the USAF began drawing down its Thailand-based units and closing its bases.

The 388th TFW entered into intensive training program to maintain combat readiness and continued to fly electronic surveillance and intelligence missions. The F-4 and A-7 aircraft practiced bombing and intercept missions in western Thailand. A large exercise was held on the first Monday of every month, involving all USAF units in Thailand. Commando Scrimmage covered skills such as dogfighting, aerial refuelling, airborne command posts and forward air controllers. The A-7D aircraft were pitted against the F-4 aircraft in dissimilar air combat exercises. These missions were flown as a deterrent to North Vietnam as a signal that if the Paris Peace Accords were broken, the United States would use its air power to enforce its provisions.

A drawdown of forces in Thailand was announced in mid-1974. With the closure of Takhli RTAFB the 347th Tactical Fighter Wing and 428th Tactical Fighter Squadron and the 429th Tactical Fighter Squadron each equipped with the F-111 were moved to Korat on 12 July 1974. Later that month, the 16th Special Operations Squadron equipped with AC-130 Spectre gunships was moved to Korat from Ubon RTAFB.

- On 15 March 1974, the EB-66s of the 42nd Tactical Electronic Warfare Squadron were sent to AMARC and the squadron was inactivated.
- The 354th Tactical Fighter Wing ended its rotating deployments to Korat on 23 May 1974 and returned its A-7D squadrons (353rd and 355th TFS) and aircraft to Myrtle Beach Air Force Base.
- The EC-130s and personnel of 7th ACCS were transferred to the 374th Tactical Airlift Wing at Clark Air Base, Philippines on 22 May 1974.
- The 552nd AEW&C returned to McClellan AFB California in June 1974, ending the College Eye mission.
- On 15 November 1974, the F-105F/G's of the 17th WWS were withdrawn and transferred to the 562d TFS/35 TFW at George Air Force Base, California.

The wars in Cambodia and Laos, however continued. With the political changes in the US during 1974, and the resignation of President Nixon, the air power of the United States at its Thailand bases did not respond to the collapse of the Lon Nol government to the Khmer Rouge in Cambodia during April 1975 nor to the takeover of Laos by the Pathet Lao. Ultimately, the North Vietnamese invasion of South Vietnam during March and April 1975 and the collapse of the Republic of Vietnam also was not opposed militarily by the US.

The only missions flown were aircraft of the 388th TFW providing air cover and escort during Operation Eagle Pull, the evacuation of Americans from Phnom Penh, Cambodia and Operation Frequent Wind the evacuation of Americans and at-risk Vietnamese from Saigon, South Vietnam.

On 14–15 May 1975, aircraft assigned to Korat provided air cover in what is considered the last battle of the Vietnam war, the recovery of the SS Mayaguez after it was hijacked by the Khmer Rouge.

With the fall of both Cambodia and South Vietnam in April 1975, the political climate between Washington and the government of PM Sanya Dharmasakti had soured. Immediately after the news broke of the use of Thai bases to support the Mayaguez rescue the Thai Government lodged a formal protest with the US and riots broke out outside the US Embassy in Bangkok. The Thai government wanted the US out of Thailand by the end of the year. The USAF implemented Palace Lightning, to withdraw its aircraft and personnel from Thailand.

On 30 June 1975, the 347th TFW F-111As and the 428th and 429th TFS were inactivated. The F-111s were sent to the 422d Fighter Weapons Squadron at Nellis Air Force Base, Nevada. The 347th became an F-4E wing at Moody Air Force Base, Georgia.

In late 1975, there were only three combat squadrons at Korat, consisting of 24 F-4Ds of the 34th TFS, 24 A-7Ds of the 3rd TFS, and six AC-130H "Spectre" aircraft of the 16th Special Operations Squadron. The 34th TFS shut down, and flew their aircraft to Hill AFB, Utah, in December of that year.

- The 16th Special Operations Squadron transferred to Hurlburt Field, Florida on 12 December 1975
- The 3rd Tactical Fighter Squadron was transferred to Clark AB, Philippines on 15 December

On 23 December 1975, the 388th TFW and its remaining squadron, the 34th TFS, transferred to Hill AFB, Utah.

After the departure of the 388th TFW, the USAF retained a small flight of security police at Korat to provide base security and to deter theft of equipment until the final return of the base to the Thai Government.

The USAF officially turned Korat over to the Thai Government on 26 February 1976.

=== Other major USAF units assigned ===
- Det. 17, 601st Photo Flight (MAC), (HQ - 600th Photo Squadron)
- 1974th Communications Squadron and Group (Tenant AFCS)
- 1998th Communications Squadron (Tenant AFCS)
- American Forces Thailand Network (Tenant AFRTS)
- Detachment 7, 6922 Security Wing

=== RTAF use after 1975 ===
After the US withdrawal in 1976, the RTAF consolidated the equipment left by the departing USAF units in accordance with government-to-government agreements, and assumed use of the base at Korat. The American withdrawal had quickly revealed to the Thai Government the inadequacy of its air force in the event of a conventional war in Southeast Asia. Accordingly, in the 1980s the government allotted large amounts of money for the purchase of modern aircraft and spare parts.

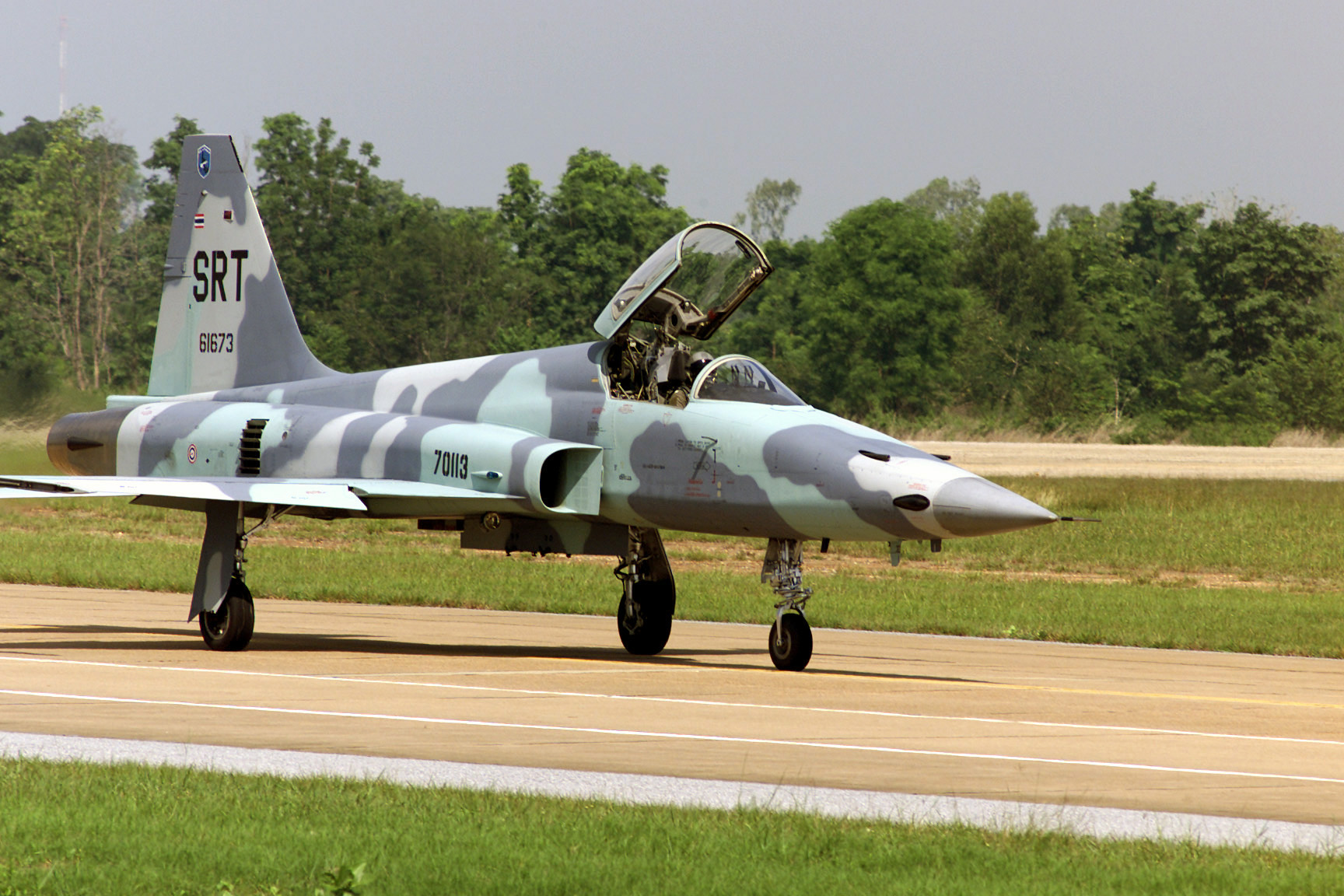
A Royal Thai Air Force Northrop F-5E Tiger II (USAF s/n 76-1673) taxies on the flight line at Korat

Thirty-eight F-5E and F-5F Tiger II fighter-bombers formed the nucleus of the RTAF's defense and tactical firepower. The F-5Es were accompanied by training teams of American civilian and military technicians, who worked with members of the RTAF.

In addition to the F-5E and F-5F fighter-bombers, OV-10C counter-insurgency aircraft, transports, and helicopters were added to the RTAF inventory. In 1985 the United States Congress authorized the sale of the F-16 fighter to Thailand.

By the late 1980s, Korat, Takhli, and Don Muang RTAFB outside Bangkok, which was shared with civil aviation, were the primary operational holdings of the RTAF. Maintenance of the facilities at other bases abandoned by the United States (Ubon, Udorn) proved too costly and exceeded Thai needs and were turned over to the Department of Civil Aviation for civil use. Nakhon Phanom and U-Tapao were placed under the control of the Royal Thai Navy. Nonetheless, all runways on the closed or transferred airfields were still available for military training and emergency use.

== Camp Friendship (United States Army) ==
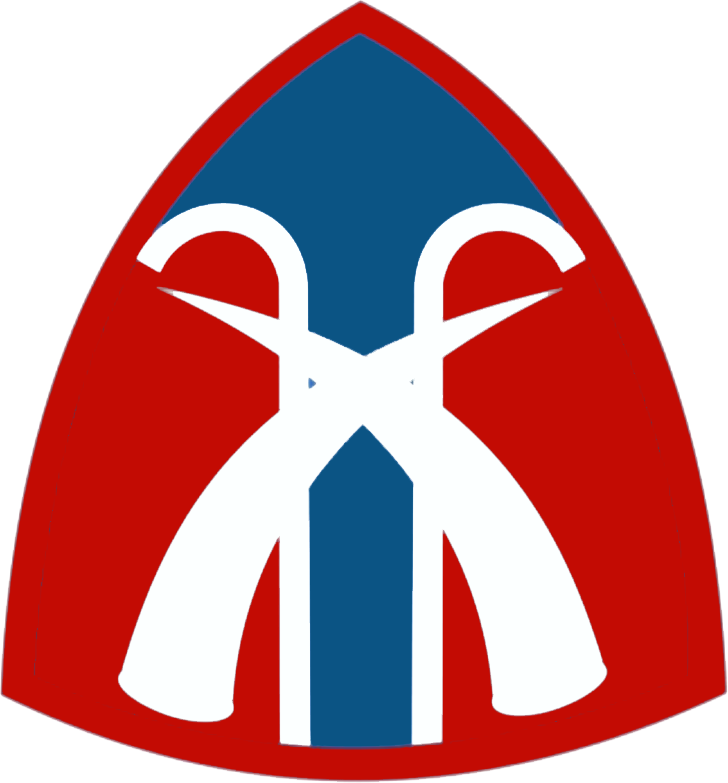
USARSUPTHAI SSI

Adjacent to Korat RTAFB to the south was United States Army Camp Friendship. It was a separate facility which pre-dated Korat RTAFB.

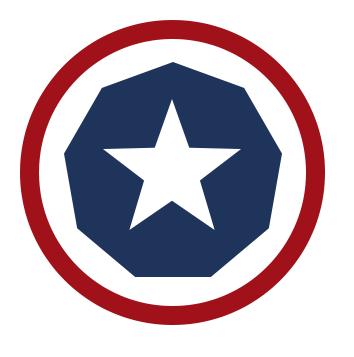
9th LOGISTICAL COMMAND SSI - parent unit of the 44th ENGINEER GROUP

Camp Friendship was the home of Headquarters, United States Army Support, Thailand (USARSUPTHAI), part of the Army Military Assistance Command Thailand (MACTHAI). The facility was initially set up as a forward operating base for equipment storage of the 25th Infantry Division, which would have deployed to Thailand in the event of invasion. The USAF would be able to airlift the division into Korat where they could pick up their equipment and move into battle.

The host unit was the 44th Engineer Group (Construction), part of the 9th Logistics Command. It was a large facility (larger than Korat RTAFB) complete with support offices, barracks for about 4,000 personnel, enlisted, NCO, and officer clubs, a motor pool, a large hospital, athletic fields, and other facilities. It was assigned APO San Francisco 96233.

Its mission was to build roads and a support (logistics) network in support of US Army and USAF operations in Thailand by executing the troop construction portion of the military construction program, performing engineer reconnaissance, and accomplishing civil action projects as resources permitted. The group constructed the Bangkok By-Pass Road, a 95 km asphalt highway between Chachoengsao and Kabin Buri, which was opened in February 1966. For their performance in the construction of this road (now Route 304), the 809th Engineer Battalion (Construction) and the 561st Engineer Company (Construction) were awarded Meritorious Unit Commendations.

As soon as the Bangkok bypass road paving was completed, Company B moved to Sattahip to begin construction of Camp Vayama, a 1,000-man troop cantonment area which would eventually become part of a vast port and logistical complex. Joined by Company C in the later part of May, construction continued. In August, the main portion of Company C was moved to Sakon Nakon where it built a troop cantonment area, a special forces camp, and a POL tank farm at Nakom Phanom (NKP) in support of the air force.

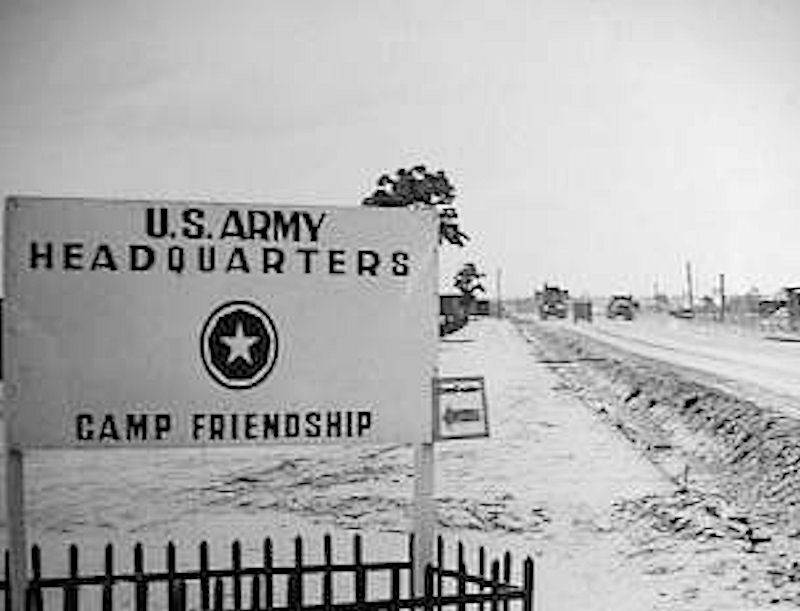
Camp Friendship – Headquarters 1968

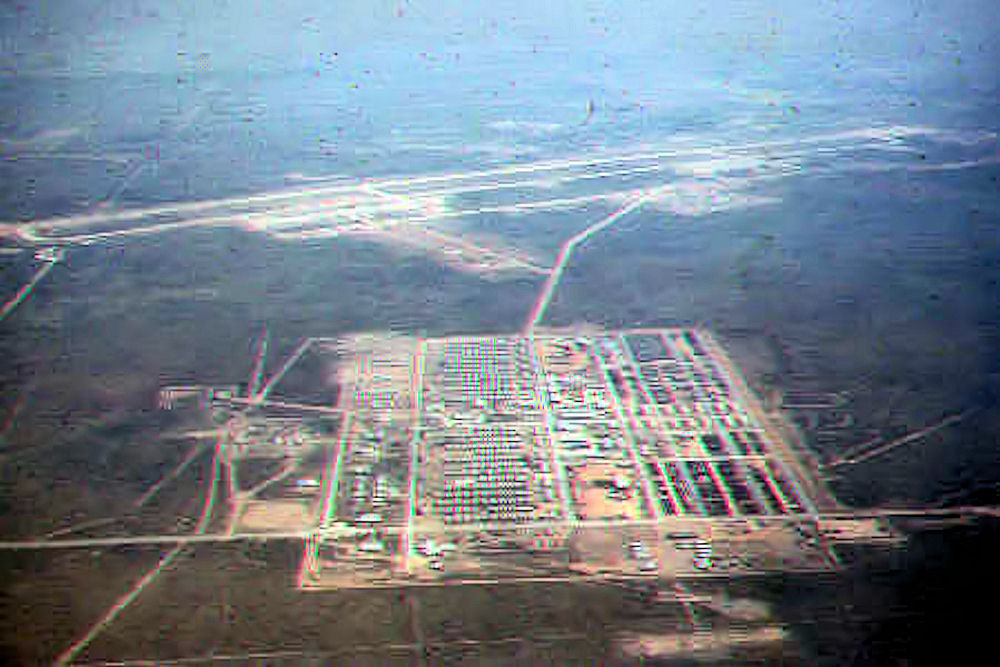
Camp Friendship viewed from the air in 1964 with Korat Air Base at the top of the photo, however much of the support base is not yet constructed

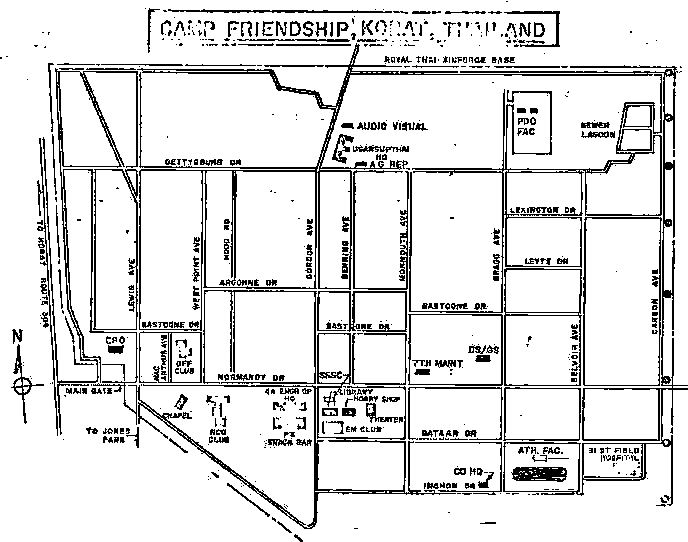
General map of Camp Friendship (14°54′44″N 102°04′42″E)

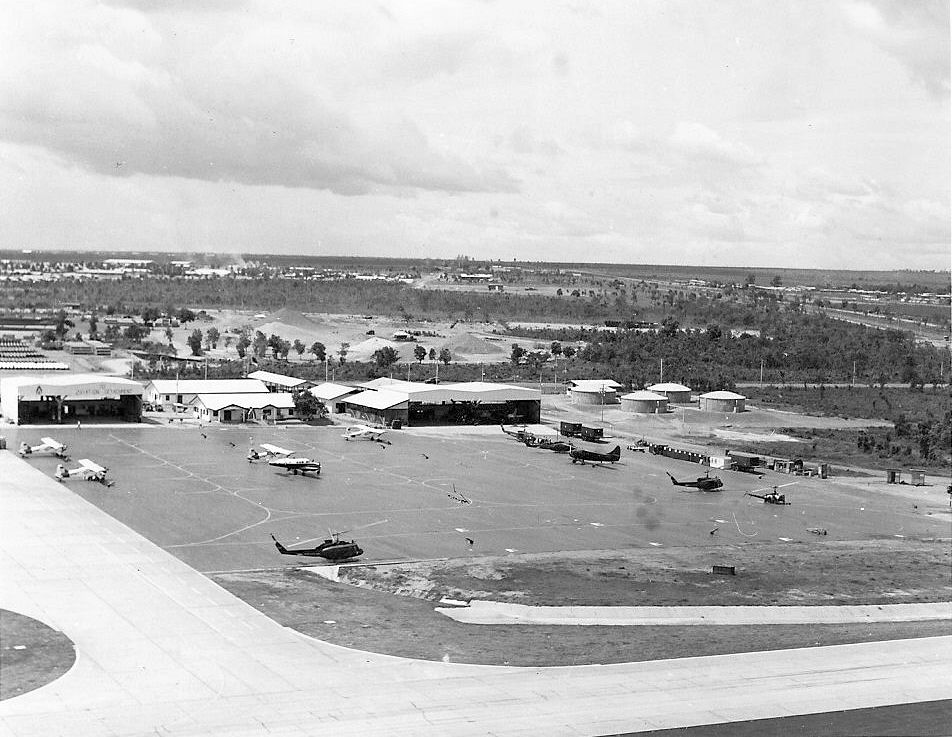
70th Aviation Detachment (Army) Parking Ramp at Korat RTAFB

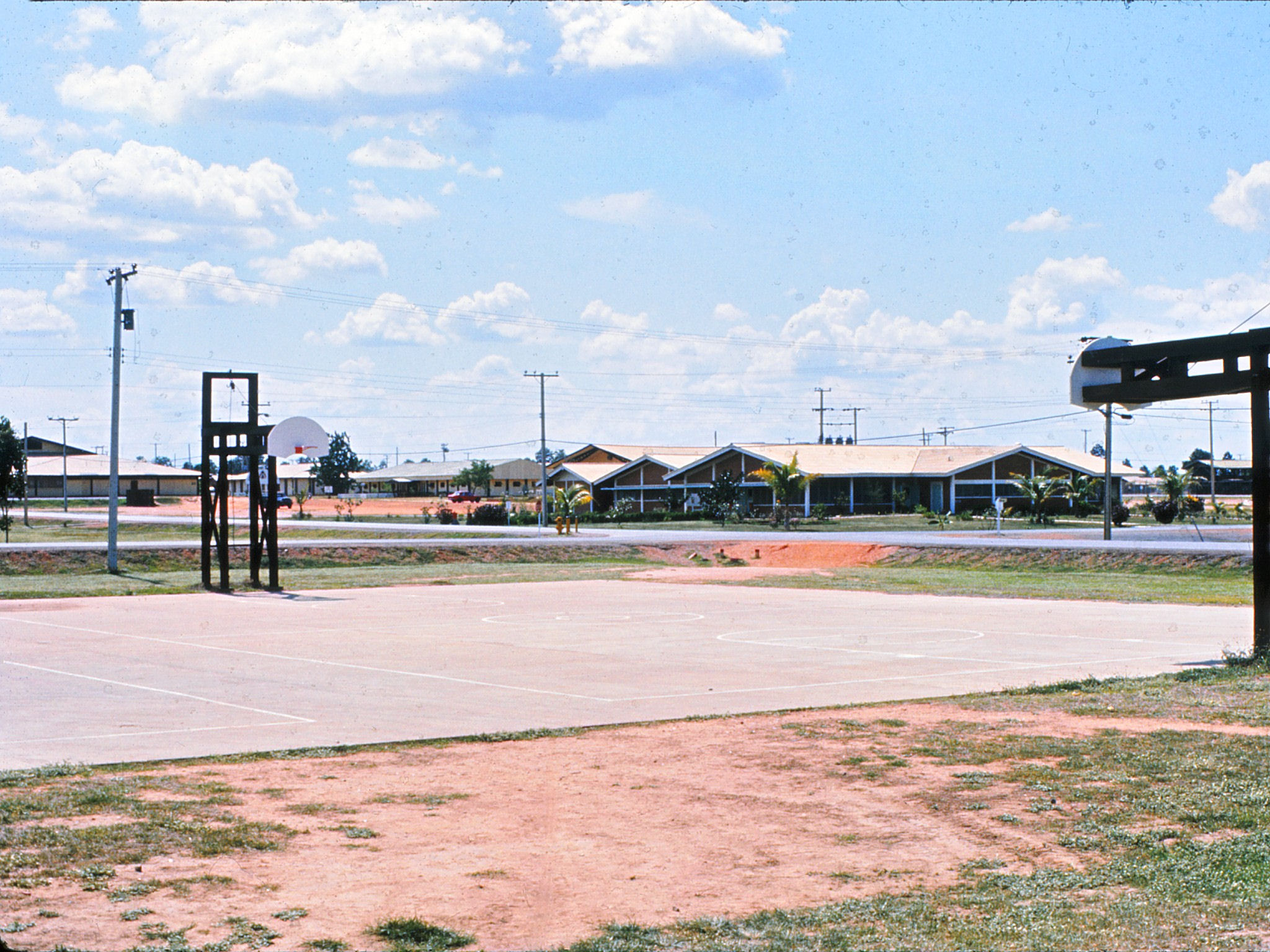
Basketball court and a mess hall, looking northeast at Benning Ave and Bataan Drive, 1970

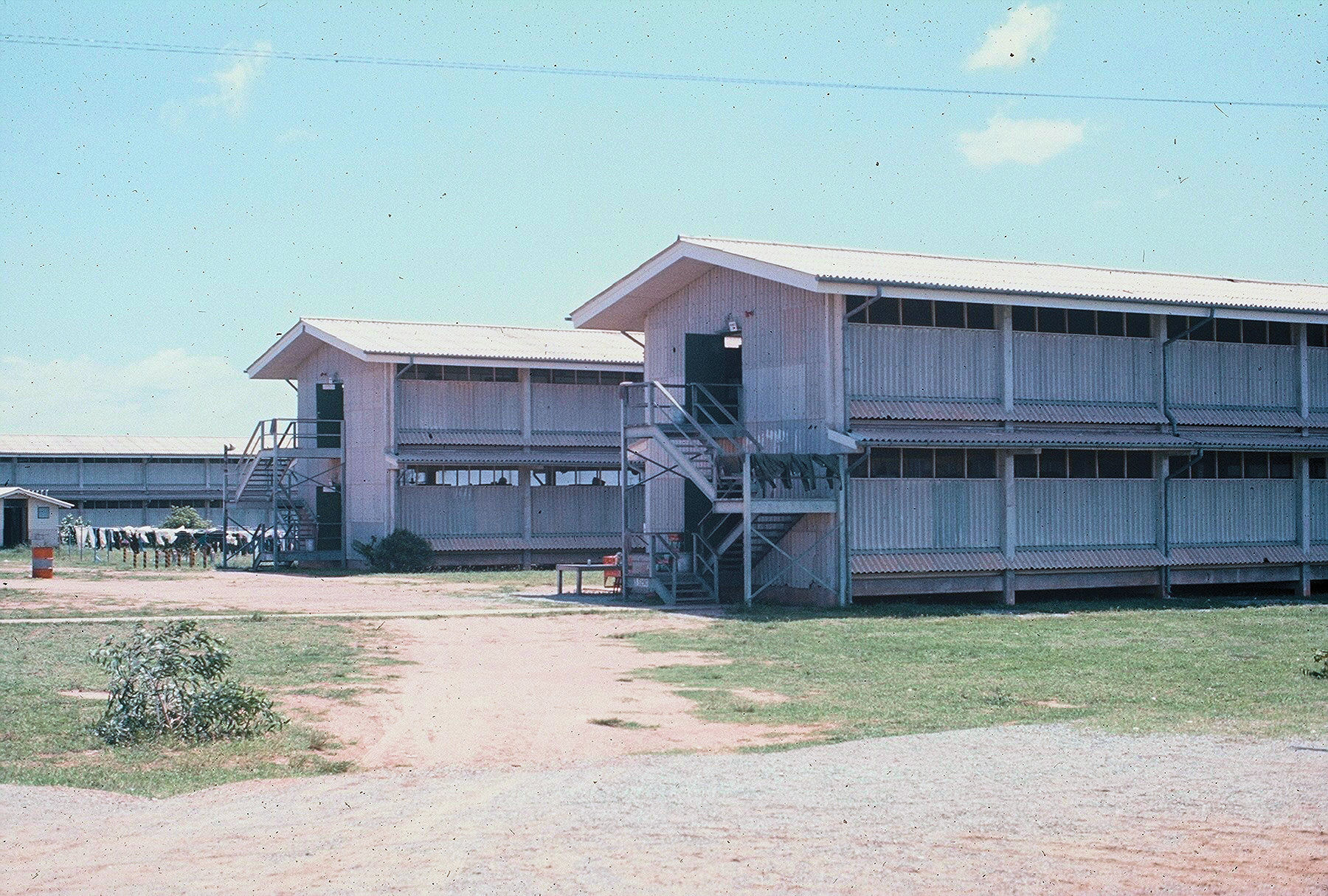
Barracks at Camp Friendship, part of a group of five "H-type" open bay design south of Bataan Drive used by the air force in 1973

On 3 January 1967, Company C returned to Phanom Sarakam to begin work on the "inland road", a 122-kilometer, all-weather highway which would connect the Port of Sattahip with the Bangkok bypass road (now route 331). Upon its completion, the inland road became a vital contribution to the economic development of Thailand and served as an important link in the supply and communication lines between the Gulf of Siam and northeast Thailand.

In 1970, the 44th Engineer Group was inactivated in Thailand as part of the draw down of United States forces in Southeast Asia. Camp Friendship closed as a separate facility in 1971 and much of the facility was turned over to the Royal Thai Army. After its closure, the USAF retained some barracks and personnel support facilities. The 388th Tactical Fighter Wing used those parts of Camp Friendship for overflow of personnel assigned or deployed to it until the USAF turned Korat Air Base over to the RTAF in early 1976.

Today, Camp Friendship is a Royal Thai Army artillery base. Some of the old US facilities are still in use, and some new construction has also been erected.

=== USARSUPTHAI Commanders ===
- Brigadier General David E. Ott Dec. 1968 - Jan. 1970
- Brigadier General John W. Vessey, Jr. Jan. 1970 - Jan. 1971
- Brigadier General John L. Osteen Jan. 1971 - July 1974

=== Camp Friendship Subordinate Units ===
- HHC 9th Logistics
- HHC USARSUPTHAI
- HQ 809th Engineer Battalion
- HQ USARSUPTHAI Liaison
- US Embassy Attache Office
- USARSUPTHAI
- USASTRATCOM SIG Battalion
- USASCCCCA
- 7th Airlift Platoon
- 7th MAINT Battalion, Direct Support 1965–71
- 9th Logistical Command HHD Logistics Support 1963–70
- 9th Logistics Pad 55/56
- 13th MP Company, Separate 1969–73
- 21st MED Depot Medical 1967–70
- 28th Signal Company
- 31st MED Field Hospital 1962–70
- 33rd Transportation TC
- 35th Finance Sec Disb
- 40th MP Battalion, Military Police Support 1967–70
- 41st ORD Company, Direct Ammunition Support 3/1966-9/1966
- 44th Engineer Group, HHC/HHD Construction 1962–70
- 46th Special Forces (SF)
- 55th Signal Company
- 57th MAINT Company, Direct Support 1963–71
- 57th Ordinance Company DS
- 70th Aviation Detachment
- 93rd Psyops Co
- 128th Medical Battalion
- 133rd MED Group, HHD Medical Support 1968–70
- 172nd Transportation Detachment
- 219th MP Company, Physical Security 1966–71
- 256th AG Company Personnel 1967–71
- 258th Transportation Detachment
- 260th Transportation Company TC
- 270th Transportation Detachment
- 270th Ordnance Detachment
- 281st MP Company
- 291st Transportation Company TC
- 313th Transportation Company TC
- 331st Sup Co (SUP-DEP) *1964–66*
- 331st Supply Depot
- 379th Signal Battalion
- 428th MED Battalion, HHD Medical Support 1966–68
- 442nd Signal Battalion 1967–71
- 501st Field Depot
- 513th MP Det
- 519th Transportation Battalion
- 528th Engineer Detachment (Utilities) *change (28 August 2011)
- 538th Engineer Battalion, Construction 1965–70
- 558th Supply Company
- 561st Engineer Company (Construction)
- 590th Supply & Service (DS)
- 590th QM Company (DS) 1964–65
- 593rd EN Company, Construction 6/1963-8/1963
- 597th MAINT Company, Direct Support 1966–69
- 697th EN Company, Pipeline Construction Support 1965–69
- 720th Military Police Battalion
- 738th Engineer Support Company, Supply Point *1963–65*
- 809th Engineer Battalion
- 999th Engineer Battalion

== See also ==
- Wing 1 Nakhon Ratchasima
- United States Air Force in Thailand
- United States Pacific Air Forces
- Seventh Air Force
- Thirteenth Air Force

== Bibliography ==
- Endicott, Judy G. Active Air Force wings as of 1 October 1995; USAF active flying, space, and missile squadrons as of 1 October 1995. Maxwell AFB, Alabama: Office of Air Force History, 1999. CD-ROM.
- Glasser, Jeffrey D. The Secret Vietnam War: The United States Air Force in Thailand, 1961–1975. McFarland & Company, 1998. ISBN 0-7864-0084-6.
- Martin, Patrick. Tail Code: The Complete History of USAF Tactical Aircraft Tail Code Markings. Schiffer Military Aviation History, 1994. ISBN 0-88740-513-4.
- Logan, Don. The 388th Tactical Fighter Wing: At Korat Royal Thai Air Force Base, 1972. Atglen, Pennsylvania: Schiffer Publishing, 1997. ISBN 0-88740-798-6.
- USAAS-USAAC-USAAF-USAF Aircraft Serial Numbers—1908 to present
- The Royal Thai Air Force (English Pages)
- Royal Thai Air Force – Overview
