= United States Air Force in Thailand =

Bases of the United States Air Force in Thailand (1961–1975)

- Part of the Vietnam War Map Of Major USAF bases in Thailand
Date	1961–1975
Location	Thailand
Result	US withdrawal in accordance with basing agreement with Thai government.

Belligerents
United States; Thailand; Kingdom of Laos; Philippines; Supported By; South Vietnam; Japan	Pathet Lao; North Vietnam; Communist Party of Thailand; Supported By; Viet Cong; Soviet Union; China

The United States Air Force (USAF) deployed combat aircraft to Thailand from 1960 to 1975 during the Vietnam War. Today, US military units train with other Asian militaries in Thailand. Royal Thai Air Force Bases are an important element in the Pentagon's "forward positioning" strategy.

== Vietnam War ==
During the Vietnam War, about 80% of all USAF air strikes over North Vietnam originated from air bases in Thailand. At its peak in 1969 more airmen were serving in Thailand than were serving in South Vietnam.

Under Thailand's "gentleman's agreement" with the U.S., the bases were considered Royal Thai Air Force bases and were commanded by Thai officers. Thai air police helped control access to the bases; U.S. air police did carry weapons. Command of the American units, however, remained with U.S. wing commanders and their Seventh Air Force/Thirteenth Air Force headquarters.

At Udorn, just from Hanoi supersonic, unarmed RF-101 and RF-4C photo-reconnaissance jets launched and flew missions over target areas immediately before and after a raid to photograph the damage so assessments of attacks could be made. Udorn also hosted three squadrons of F-4C/D & E Phantoms which flew escort, sweep, and Air Combat Patrol missions to protect other U.S. strike aircraft. From Korat, Takhli and Ubon came the Republic F-105 Thunderchiefs and F-4C and F-4D Phantoms that actually delivered the bombs and also General Dynamics F-111s with terrain-following radar from Takhli. (During the deployment of the F-111s three crashed soon after arriving at Takhli and the F-111 fleet was grounded to investigate the problem). From U-Tapao airfield on the Gulf of Siam, the largest airfield in Southeast Asia, came the Boeing B-52s and the four-engine Boeing KC-135 Stratotanker refuellers that took to the air and refueled the aircraft just before and after they hit North Vietnam. From Takhli flew EB-66 electronic-warfare jets with special equipment that can detect the "fingerprints" of enemy radar in the sky and then send out a signal that fouls up the screen below. Flying out of Takhli, F-105s armed with radar-guided Shrike missiles had the job of knocking out SAM sites.

From Nakhon Phanom came the air-rescue-and-recovery team. Flying HH43 and CH-3 helicopters, or "Jolly Green Giants," and protected by propeller-driven A-1 “Sandy” ground attack planes, R. &. R. pilots had gone into Hanoi's outskirts to rescue downed fliers.

These are the major bases the USAF operated from in Thailand:

- Don Muang Royal Thai Air Force Base, 1961–1970

Major USAF Unit: 631st Combat Support Group, 1962–1970

- Korat Royal Thai Air Force Base, 1962–1975

Major USAF Unit: 388th Tactical Fighter Wing, 1965–1975
Major USAF Unit: 553rd Reconnaissance Wing, 1967-1971

- Nakhon Phanom Royal Thai Navy Base, 1962–1976

Major USAF Unit: 56th Special Operations Wing, 1967–1975

- Takhli Royal Thai Air Force Base, 1961–1971; 1972–1974

Major USAF Unit: 355th Tactical Fighter Wing, 1965–1971; Rotational units, 1972–1974

- U-Tapao Royal Thai Navy Airfield, 1965–1976

Major USAF Units: 4258th Strategic Wing, 1966–1970; 307th Strategic Wing, 1970–1975

- Ubon Royal Thai Air Force Base, 1965–1974

Major USAF Unit: 8th Tactical Fighter Wing, 1965–1974

- Udorn Royal Thai Air Force Base, 1964–1976

Major USAF Unit: 432d Tactical Reconnaissance Wing, 1966–1975

In addition Marine Aircraft Group 15 operated from Royal Thai Air Base Nam Phong from June 1972 to September 1973.

The circumstances surrounding the creation of these bases and the American deployment is a long and complex tale. Its origins lie in the French withdrawal from Indochina as a result of the 1954 Geneva Agreement, nationalism and the Cold War.

=== Lao Civil War ===
Throughout the 1950s, Laos had been embroiled in civil war, and by the early 1960s, the conflict was threatening to spread to Thailand. Major fighting broke out in December 1960 and spread far enough to cause casualties among Thai civilians living along the Mekong River. The United States Embassy in Vientiane was burned to the ground and fighting raged in and around the city. Western governments recognized different leaders, with military aid being provided to the communist Pathet Lao forces by the Soviet Union. In December, the U.S. air attaché photographed a Soviet Il-14 cargo plane transporting supplies to communist forces near Van Vieng. On 23 December, communist forces fired on an American VC-47 passenger transport. The plane, which was carrying the air attaché, was struck by .50 caliber rounds but was able to land safely. It was the first American aircraft in Southeast Asia to be fired upon.

Thailand was a constitutional monarchy and traditionally maintained a pro-western stance in foreign affairs. The fighting in Laos was of great concern to the Thai government. The government feared that should Laos fall to the communists, the "Domino Theory" would place the entire region, including Thailand, in jeopardy. Northeast Thailand housed a community of Vietnamese mixed with Chinese. Some of the Vietnamese wanted to move to communist North Vietnam, but they were not necessarily communist sympathizers. Indeed, attempts by North Vietnamese communists to organize the Vietnamese in Thailand were dealt with strongly by the Thai government.

The Royal Thai Government began flying reconnaissance missions over Laos on 19 December 1960 with some RT-33 photo jets. United States Pacific Command (CINCPAC) ordered American technicians to assist the Royal Thai Air Force in processing and analyzing the film. On 19 January 1961, PACAF had identified 25 airfields, 49 communications routes, and 19 urban targets. A few weeks later, HQ USAF authorized the release of these photographs to the governments of Laos and Thailand.

On 23 March 1961 Pathet Lao anti-aircraft artillery opened fire on an American C-47 as it flew over the eastern portion of the Plaines des Jarres, shooting the plane down. It was one of the first USAF aircraft shot down over Indochina, and marked the beginning of combat action by the USAF from bases in Thailand.

=== Origins of U.S. military presence in Thailand ===
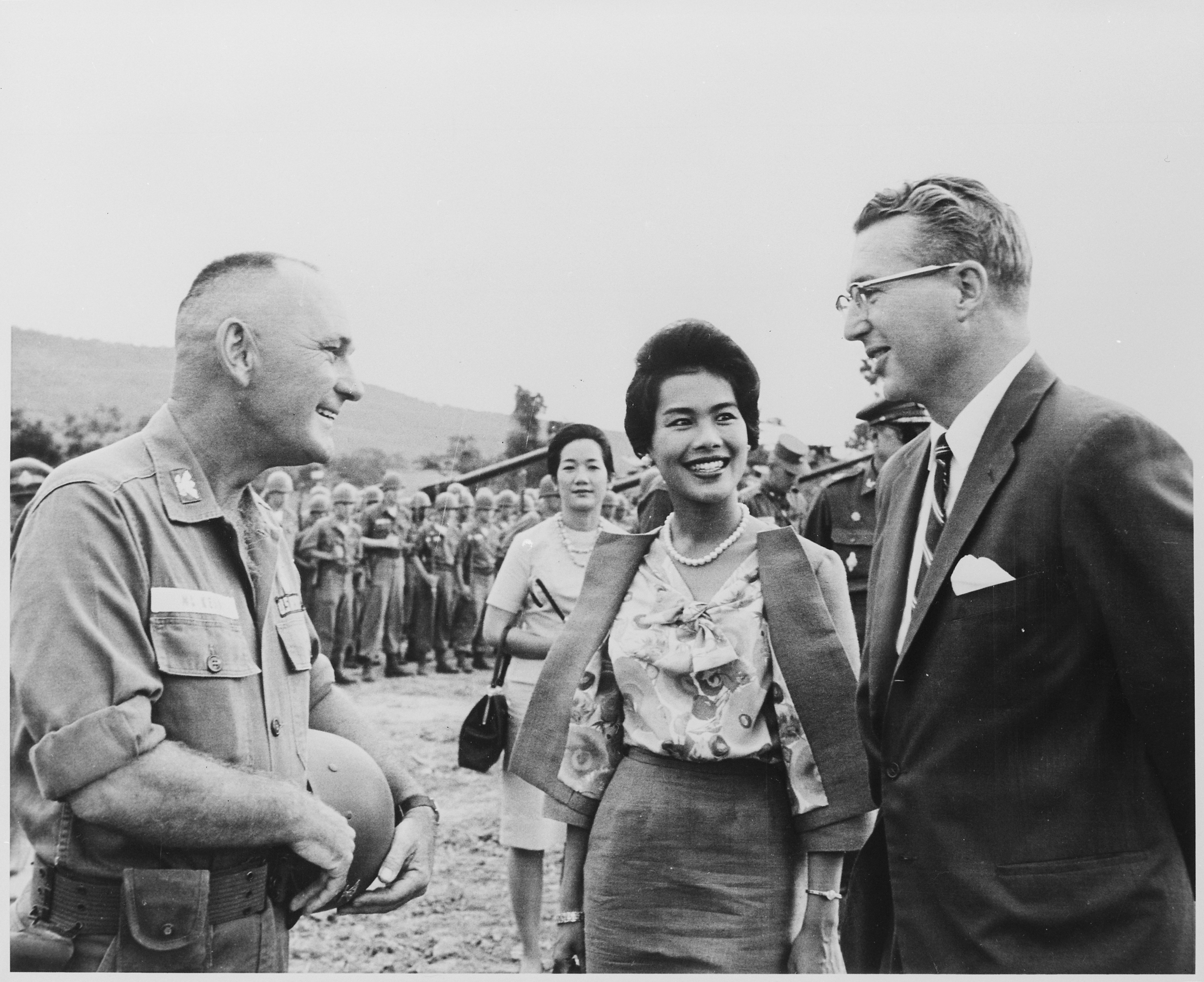
King Bhumibol and Queen Sirikit of Thailand visited the U.S. Army's 27th Infantry "Wolfhounds" near Korat, Thailand in 1962. Here, Queen Sirikit visited with Colonel William A. Mckean, Commander of the 27th, and U.S. Ambassador to Thailand, Kenneth T. Young, Jr. The U.S. forces in Thailand are used to assist as instructors and advisors.

The official American military presence in Thailand started in April 1961 when an advance party of the USAF 6010th Tactical (TAC) Group arrived at Don Muang at the request of the Royal Thai government to establish an aircraft warning system.

On April 20, 1961 a detachment of six F100 Super Sabres from the 510TFS/405TFW based at Clark AB, Philippines deployed to Don Muang Airport as part of Operation Bell Tone. Immediately upon arrival, two of these planes were loaded with a full load (800 rnds) of 20mm ammunition and 4 GAR-8 (AIM-9B) Sidewinder missiles and placed on 5 minute alert.

Also in March 1962, a small detachment of F-102 "Delta Daggers" from the 509th Fighter-Interceptor Squadron, based at Clark AB, Philippines were sent to Don Muang under "Operation Bell Tone". Their mission was to bolster the defense capabilities of the Royal Thai Air Force. For the next several years, a minimum of four F-102 interceptors were kept on alert at Don Muang.

Then in November 1961, four RF-101C reconnaissance aircraft of the 45th Tactical Reconnaissance Squadron stationed at Misawa AB, Japan and their photo lab arrived at Don Muang. The RF-101s were sent to assist Royal Thai AF RT-33 aircraft in performing aerial recon flights over Laos. The RF-101s stayed until May 1962, then returned for a second deployment during November and December 1962.

These small detachments received logistical support from their home bases outside of Southeast Asia. Circumstances in the region, however, were leading to drastic changes in the US position. On 29 April 1961, the Joint Chiefs of Staff instructed CINCPAC to move 5,000 troops and air elements to both Udon Air Base and Da Nang Air Base. It was believed these forces were going to take action in Laos. Also, in South Vietnam, the numbers of Communist insurgents continued to increase. More American military advisers were being dispatched to the country, but their reports indicted a need for stronger measures to be taken.

In addition, one of U.S. President John F. Kennedy's advisers indicated the need for deterring guerrilla action in northeast Thailand was more pressing than affairs in Vietnam, and Thailand should take precedence. Vice-President Lyndon B. Johnson recommended that Thailand be given US$50 million in military aid.

Two milestones occurred early in 1962. The "Military Assistance Group in South Vietnam" was renamed U.S. Military Assistance Command, Vietnam (MACV) on 6 February. The other being a joint communication from Secretary of State Dean Rusk and Thai Foreign Minister Thanat Koman on 6 March in which the United States "firm intention... to aid Thailand, its ally and historic friend in resisting communist aggression and subversion". As a result, the "Military Assistance Command, Thailand (MACT)" was set up on 15 May 1962 at Don Muang.

On 23 July 1962 fourteen nations signed the Geneva Accords of 1962 which contained the following provisions:

- Laos was to become politically neutral and not enter into any military alliance.
- Laos would not allow foreign military forces to use or occupy its territory.
- Laos would not recognize any military alliance or coalition, such as SEATO.
- Laos would not allow any foreign interference in its internal affairs.
- All foreign troops, paramilitary forces and foreign military personnel would be removed from Laos in the "shortest possible time".

The treaty was signed the Soviet Union, South Vietnam, China, North Vietnam and the United States, among others. But North Vietnam continued moving heavy weapons into Laos to support the communist rebel Pathet Lao. Of the 10,000 North Vietnamese troops in Laos at the time of the agreement, 6,000 remained in the country in violation of the accords.

In spite of the agreement, fighting continued in Laos, with North Vietnamese troops hidden in Pathet Lao-held areas. Near the end of August a USAF RF-101 reconnaissance aircraft was fired on by radar-guided Anti-aircraft warfare (AAA) batteries while flying above the cloud cover. Both sides violated the Geneva Accords.

=== Gulf of Tonkin Incident ===
On 2 August 1964, the Gulf of Tonkin Incident occurred. An alleged attack by North Vietnamese torpedo boats on American destroyer, USS Maddox DD-731]. The misinterpreted incident took place in the Gulf of Tonkin off the coast of North Vietnam. President Johnson used the flawed information about the incident to order additional forces to the area to support the government of South Vietnam.(https://www.usni.org/magazines/naval-history-magazine/2008/february/truth-about-tonkin) USAF forces were dispatched to Thailand. This marked the beginning of large scale United States military operations in Southeast Asia.

=== The "Secret War" in Laos ===
Thailand was a member of SEATO. While supposedly maintaining an air of neutrality, it was deeply concerned about the fighting in neighboring Indochina. Over the centuries, Thai governments had managed to avoid foreign domination with a policy of accommodation with the predominant power in Asia at the time. By 1965, the increasing number of American aircraft deployments to Thailand was jeopardizing policy.

The Royal Thai government's desire to avoid publicity led to the formation of a policy to downplay the United States' presence and not draw attention to its tactical air units in Thailand. This is why so little information about the USAF in Thailand was made public during the Vietnam War. Much of that information remains unavailable, being considered sensitive to the Thai government. The Thai government prohibited photographing of American personnel and military aircraft, with the exception of official archive photography taken for documentation and official release. American news agencies, such as United Press International and Associated Press, were prohibited from filing stories about American military activities. Attacks on US bases and personnel were suppressed and any personnel wounded during military action in Thailand did not receive recognition of or awards for their wounds. Military information officers were instructed that no mention was to be made of operations from Thai facilities, no names of bases were to be mentioned and no mention of operational activities were to be released. The report "Snakes in the Eagles Nest" gives a partial account of combat operations in Thailand during the Vietnam War.

USAF combat sorties from Thailand flown into both North Vietnam and South Vietnam grew as the Vietnam War expanded in the 1960s. In addition, combat missions were flown aiding friendly forces in Laos and, starting in 1970, Cambodia were also flown. The missions flown over Laos are today referred to as the Secret War.

Although the existence of the so-called "Secret War" was sometimes reported in the U.S., details were largely unavailable due to official government denials that the war even existed. The denials were seen as necessary considering that the US had signed agreements specifying the neutrality of Laos. US involvement in Laos was considered necessary because North Vietnam had effectively conquered a large part of the country and was equally lying in public about its role in Laos.

Despite these denials, however, the Secret War was actually the largest U.S. covert operation prior to the Afghan-Soviet War, with areas of Laos controlled by North Vietnam subjected to three million tons of bombing, representing the heaviest U.S.-led bombing campaign since World War II.

=== USAF withdrawal from Thailand ===
The United States ended its involvement in Southeast Asia by treaty and disengagement rather than by military victory. After the fall of Saigon on 30 April 1975, relations between Washington and Bangkok turned sour. In May 1975, the Royal Thai Government asked the United States to remove all of its combat forces (27,000 troops, 300 aircraft) by 1976.

The USAF bases were closed and the last USAF personnel left Thailand in June 1976.

The removal of U.S. military forces was accomplished by United States Marine Detachment BLT 1/9 out of Okinawa, Japan.

== After the Cold War ==
Beginning in 1982, Cobra Gold began as a multinational training event.

Starting in 1994, the USAF returned to Korat RTAFB for "Cope Tiger", an annual, multinational exercise conducted in two phases in the Asia-pacific region.

Cope Tiger involves air forces from the United States, Thailand, and Singapore, as well as U.S. Marines deployed from Japan. The flying portion of the exercise promotes closer relations and enables air force units in the region to sharpen air combat skills and practice interoperability with U.S. forces. Pilots fly both air-to-air and air-to-ground combat training missions.

American pilots fly F-15C/D Eagles, F/A-18C Hornets, F-16C Fighting Falcons, E-3B Sentry Sentry Airborne Warning and Control Systems (AWACS), and KC-135 Stratotankers.

Royal Thai Forces fly F-16 Fighting Falcons, F-5E Tigers, and ground attack L-39s

Singapore forces fly Northrop F-5s and F-16 Fighting Falcons. Other Republic of Singapore Air Force aircraft types used on Cope Tiger include AS-532 Cougar and CH-47 Chinook helicopters Grumman E-2 Hawkeye AEW aircraft, and Lockheed C-130 Hercules tanker aircraft.

More than 1,100 people participate, including approximately 500 U.S. service members and 600 service members from Thailand and Singapore.

== War in Iraq ==
Despite Thailand's neutrality on the war in Iraq, the Thai government allowed U-Tapao RTNAF to be used by American warplanes flying into combat in Iraq, as it had earlier done during the war in Afghanistan. In addition, U-Tapao may be where Al Qaeda operatives have been interrogated, according to some retired American intelligence officials.

== See also ==
- United States Pacific Air Forces
- Seventh Air Force
- Thirteenth Air Force
