= 430th Expeditionary Electronic Combat Squadron =

430th Expeditionary Electronic Combat Squadron

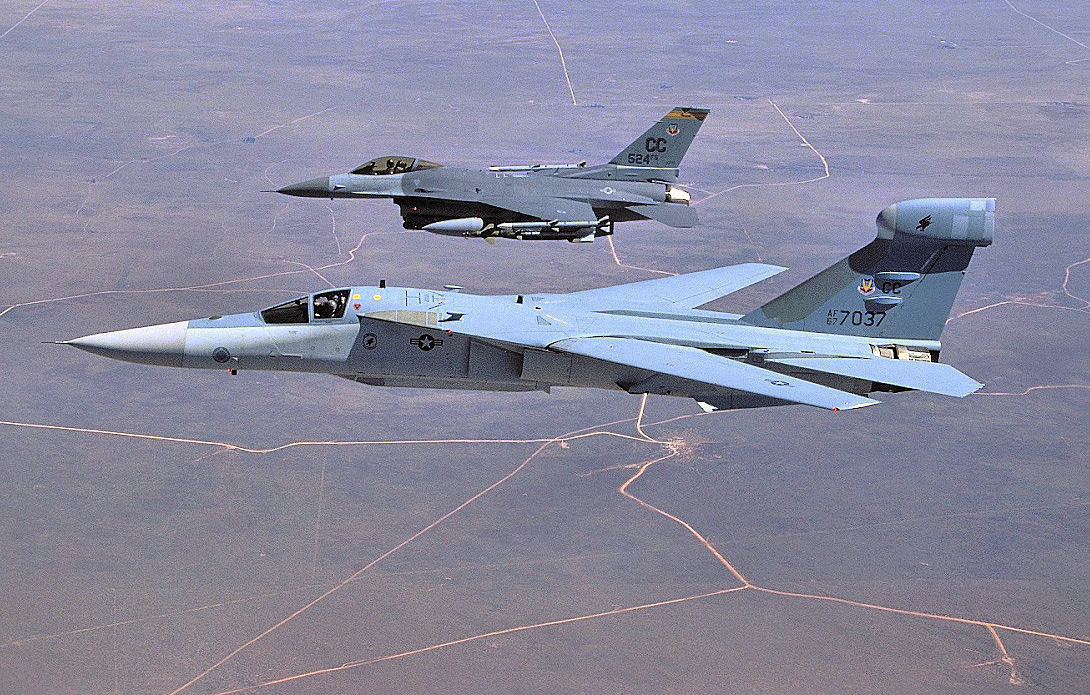
- Squadron EF-111A Raven (Note: Aircraft is General Dynamics EF-111A Raven serial 67-37.) with Cannon-based F-16 of the 524th Tactical Fighter Squadron
- Active: 1943–1945; 1952–1966; 1968–1989; 1992–1993; 2013–present
- Country: United States
- Branch: United States Air Force
- Role: Electronic Warfare
- Size: Squadron
- Part of: 451st Air Expeditionary Group
- Nicknames: WWII - The Backdoor Gang; Vietnam War - Tigers
- Colors: Red
- Mascot: Tiger
- Engagements: European Theater of Operations; Korean War; Vietnam War; Afghanistan War
- Decorations: Distinguished Unit Citation; Air Force Outstanding Unit Award with Combat "V" Device; Belgian Fourragère; Republic of Korea Presidential Unit Citation; Republic of Vietnam Gallantry Cross with Palm

Insignia
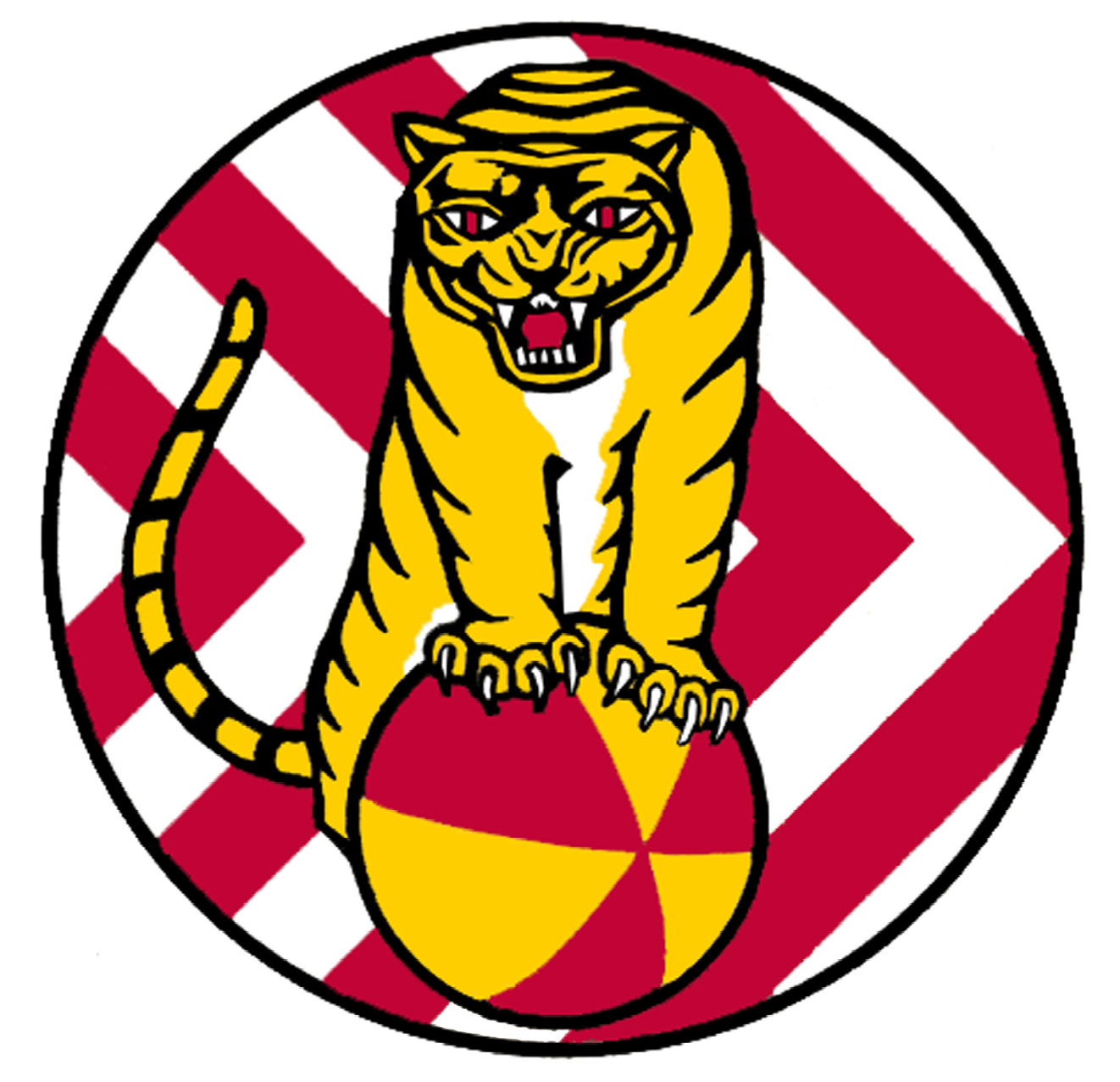
- 430th Expeditionary Electronic Combat Squadron emblem (approved 15 July 1954)

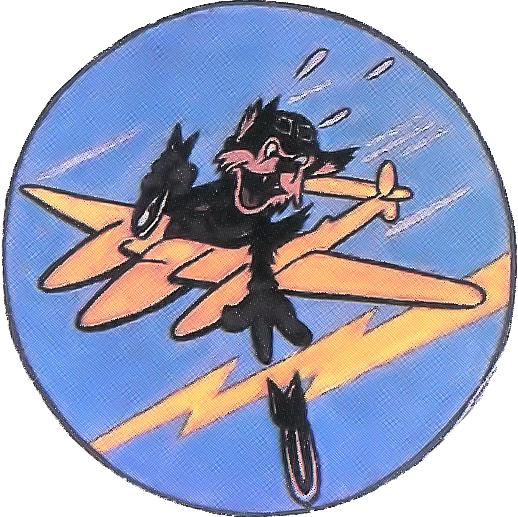
- 430th Fighter Squadron emblem (World War II)

The 430th Expeditionary Electronic Combat Squadron is an active United States Air Force unit. It is assigned to the 451st Expeditionary Operations Group.

The 430th Fighter Squadron, nicknamed "The Backdoor Gang", was first activated during World War II as part of the 474th Fighter Group and served in the European Theater of Operations, where it earned a Distinguished Unit Citation and the Belgian Fourragère for its actions in combat. It remained in Europe after V-E Day, returning to the United States, where it was inactivated at the port of embarkation in December 1945.

The squadron was reactivated as the 430th Fighter-Bomber Squadron in 1952 as part of the 474th Fighter Bomber Wing and later the 474th Fighter Bomber Group, when it replaced an Air National Guard squadron in Japan. It again saw combat in the Korean War, earning another Distinguished Unit Citation and a Republic of Korea Presidential Unit Citation. The Squadron returned to the United States in 1954.

The 430th Tactical Fighter Squadron was deployed in September 1972 to Thailand to fly combat missions in the Vietnam War, and was awarded the Air Force Outstanding Unit Award with Combat "V" Device 28 Sep 1972-22 Feb 1973 and Republic of Vietnam Gallantry Cross with Palm 28 Sep 1972-22 Feb 1973. It remained a fighter unit until inactivating in 1989.

In 1992, the unit became the 430th Electronic Combat Squadron, but was only active for one year. It was converted to provisional status and received its current name in 2013.

== History ==
=== World War II ===
The 430th Fighter Squadron was activated on 1 August 1943 as a Lockheed P-38 Lightning fighter squadron under IV Fighter Command in Southern California as part of the 474th Fighter Group. It trained with the P-38 over the Mojave Desert, moving to the European Theater of Operations, and was assigned to Ninth Air Force in England during March 1944. It operated out of Warmwell, Britain, and Saint Lambert, St. Marceau, and Peronne, France, Florennes, Belgium, and Strassfeld, Langensalza, Schweinfurt, and Stuttgart, Germany during and immediately after the war in 1945. Squadron markings on the vertical tail surfaces were a circle and "K6" with call sign "Back Door". It provided bomber escort but the primary role was as an attack and interdiction fighter. It flew its first combat missions on 25 April 1944. As part of the 474th Fighter Group, they attacked bridges and railroads in France in preparation for the Normandy invasion, provided air cover for the invasion force, and flew bombing missions to support the landings. Subsequently it conducted armed reconnaissance missions after D-Day and attacked highways and troops to support the Allied breakthrough at St Lo. The Squadron supported the British attack on Holland in Sep 1944; the Battle of the Bulge Dec 1944-Jan 1945; and the airborne assault across the Rhine in Mar 1945. As part of the 474th, it was awarded the Distinguished Unit Citation for a mission on 23 August 1944 and twice the Order of the Day, Belgian Army. Personnel were demobilized in Europe during 1945, returned to the United States in November as an administrative unit and was inactivated on 7 December 1945 without personnel or equipment.

There is a monument at Neuilly-la-Foret dedicated in 1994 to the 474th Fighter Group. The associated information sign states in English and in French, "Construction of the A-11 airfield was begun on the 22nd July 1944 by the 832nd Engineer Aviation Battalion. It was declared operational on 5 August 1944 and accommodated the 474th Fighter Group and the P-38 Lightnings (fighter bombers). About 100 planes parked on this aerodrome of around 200 hectares. Only three squadrons, with 25 fighter bombers in each one, were operational. The rest were used for liaison between the different aerodromes. On 23rd August, the 474th Fighter Group had its hour of glory, when it destroyed a significant quantity of equipment and materiel amassed along the Seine, behind the pocket of resistance of Falaise-Argentan. On 25 August, 23 pilots from the 474th Fighter Group took off from the aerodrome. 11 of them fell above the Oise after a huge combat with German fighters. On 5 September 1944, the land of the A-11 airfield was returned to French authorities."

=== Korean War ===
Redesignated the 430th Fighter-Bomber Squadron in June 1952 and reactivated in Japan under Far East Air Forces, July 1952 as a result of the Korean War. Replaced Federalized Georgia Air National Guard personnel, receiving their Republic F-84G Thunderjets. Moved to South Korea in August as part of the 474th Fighter Bomber Wing, engaging in combat operations from Kunsan Air Base (K-8). From Kunsan the squadron bombed and strafed bridges, bunkers, troop concentrations, artillery positions, and a host of other enemy targets. Moved to Taegu Air Base (K-2) in April 1953 being attached to the 58th Fighter-Bomber Wing. Flew interdiction and close air support missions in as well as attacking special strategic targets such as military schools, dams, and port facilities in North Korea until the June 1953 Armistice, Remained in South Korea for over a year afterward to insure Communist compliance with the cease-fire.

=== Cold War ===
Returned to Clovis Air Force Base, New Mexico in November 1954. Redesignated the 430th Tactical Fighter Squadron on 1 July 1958. Squadron was re-equipped with North American F-86H Sabre fighter-bomber aircraft, being assigned to Twelfth Air Force, Tactical Air Command. Maintained proficiency in tactical fighter operations, deploying components, aircraft, and crews on a global basis in support of NATO, PACAF, AAC, and other organizations. Deployed to southeastern United States during the Cuban Missile Crisis of 1962.

Moved to Nellis Air Force Base, Nevada in 1966 as part of the 474th Tactical Fighter Wing (TFW). The 474th (Roadrunners) became the first USAF operational wing equipped with the General Dynamics F-111. On 20 January 1968 the 474th Tactical Fighter Wing was activated at Nellis Air Force Base, Nevada from the 4480th TFW, giving the base an operational tactical fighter wing assigned to Twelfth Air Force. On 15 September 1968 the 430th TFS became part of the Wing.

=== Vietnam War ===
LTC Martin Refueling - 430th TFS Deployment Nellis-Takhli Sep 72

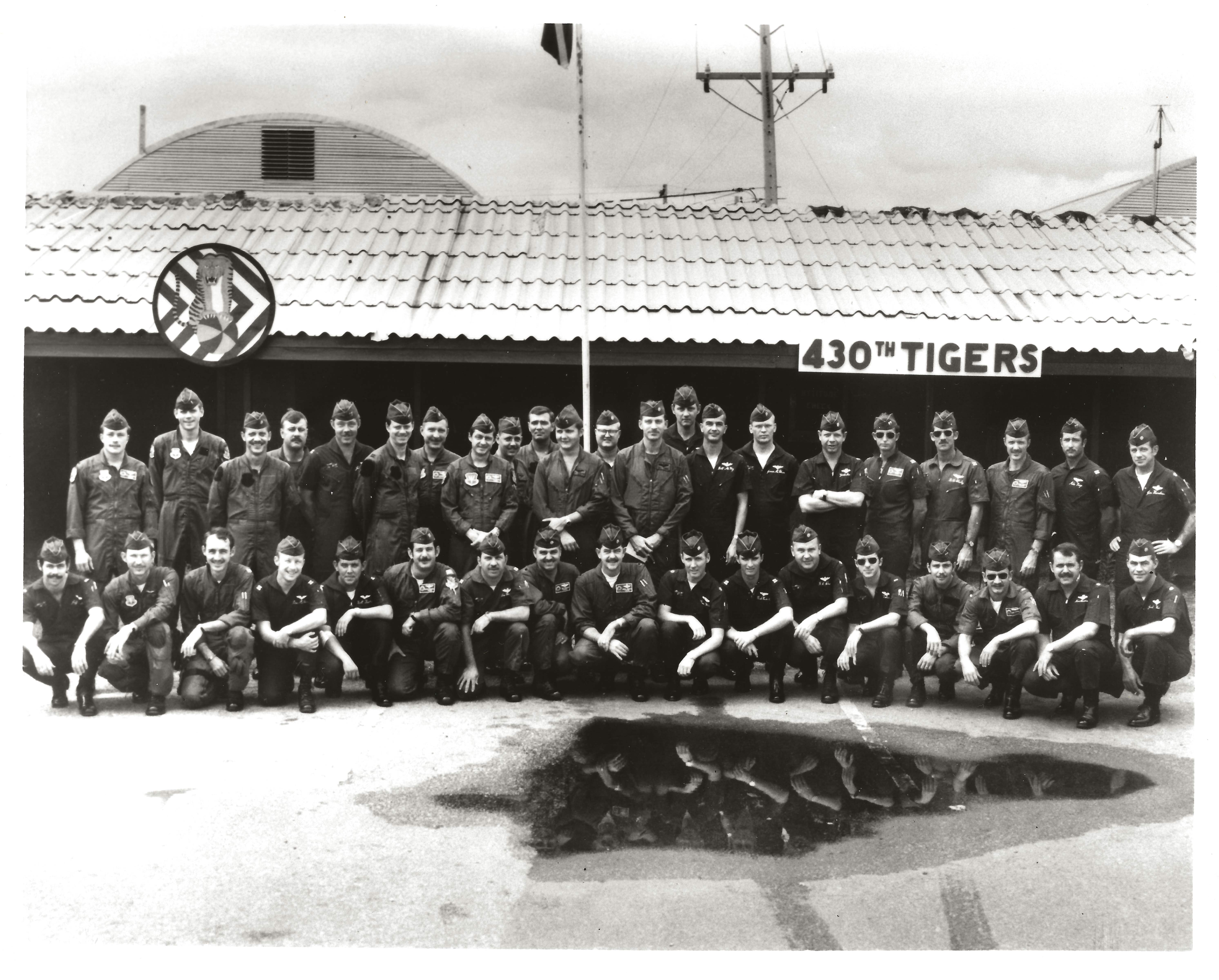
430th TFS Takhli RTAFB 14 Nov 1972 (25 crew missing due to other duties and 4 MIA)

Deployed to Takhli Royal Thai Air Force Base, Thailand in September 1972 as a result of the North Vietnamese Easter Offensive as part of the Constant Guard V deployment of the 429th TFS and 430th TFS with 24 F-111As in each squadron. The deployment included 1,487 support personnel and 40 transport aircraft loads of cargo. The enhanced strike capabilities of the two F-111A squadrons (48 aircraft) allowed them to replace the four F-4D squadrons (72 aircraft) of the 49 TFW, which returned to the U.S. This move also resulted in a reduction of total U.S. forces stationed in Thailand. The two F-111A squadrons arrived to support the last month of Operation Linebacker and all of the Operation Linebacker II bombing offensive against North Vietnam, conducted combat operations over Laos including support of Operation Phou Phiang II and Operation Phou Phiang III using the F-111A's beacon bombing capability in the defense of Long Tieng, and conducted combat operations over Cambodia, again using the F-111A's beacon bombing capability. They flew deep interdiction strike in good and bad weather when other squadrons were grounded. 430th TFS flew approximately 2,000 combat missions with excellent success rates in hitting targets even when visibility was near zero before returning to the United States on 22 March 1973. A total of four 430th TFS aircraft were lost in action with the loss of all crews. The 474th was awarded the Air Force Outstanding Unit Award with Combat "V" Device 28 Sep 1972-22 Feb 1973 and Republic of Vietnam Gallantry Cross with Palm 28 Sep 1972-22 Feb 1973.

=== Post Vietnam War ===
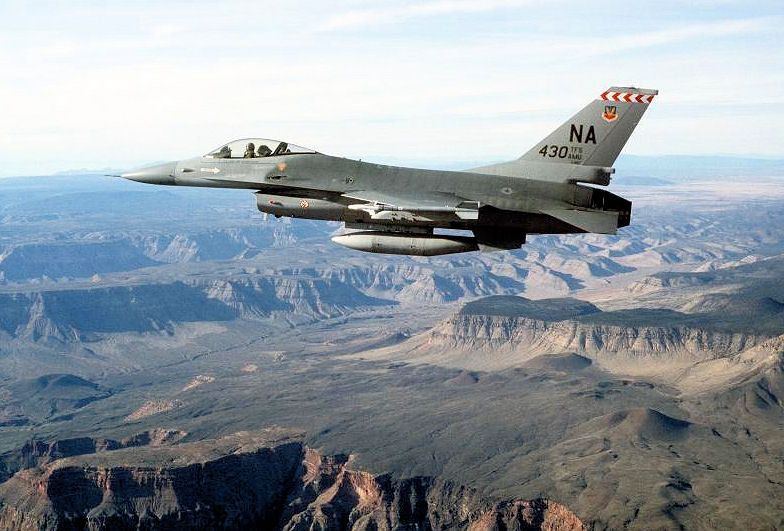
430 TFS F-16A Block 10C 80-0492 flying over the Grand Canyon in 1986

Engaged in training new pilots with the F-111A during the mid-1970s, changing equipment to the McDonnell F-4D Phantom II in August 1977 during "Operation Ready Switch", sending the F-111As to the 366th Tactical Fighter Wing at Mountain Home Air Force Base, Idaho and sending the F-111Fs from Mountain Home to Lakenheath Air Base in England to replace the departing F-4Ds. Received new Block 1/5 General Dynamics F-16A Fighting Falcon aircraft in November 1980 after protractive development period in the 1970s. Conducted routine Tactical Air Command training and deployments from Nellis with the F-16s, upgrading to Block 10/15 models in the early 1980s. Inactivated 1 July 1989.

=== Electronic combat ===
Reactivated at Cannon Air Force Base, New Mexico as the 430th Electronic Combat Squadron on 1 August 1992 in conjunction with the realignment of all General Dynamics EF-111A Raven Electronic Warfare aircraft from Mountain Home to Cannon. Relieved aircraft and trained 27th Operations Group personnel in operational use. Once the move was completed the 430th was inactivated on 29 June 1993 and squadron personnel and aircraft were transferred to the 429th Electronic Combat Squadron.

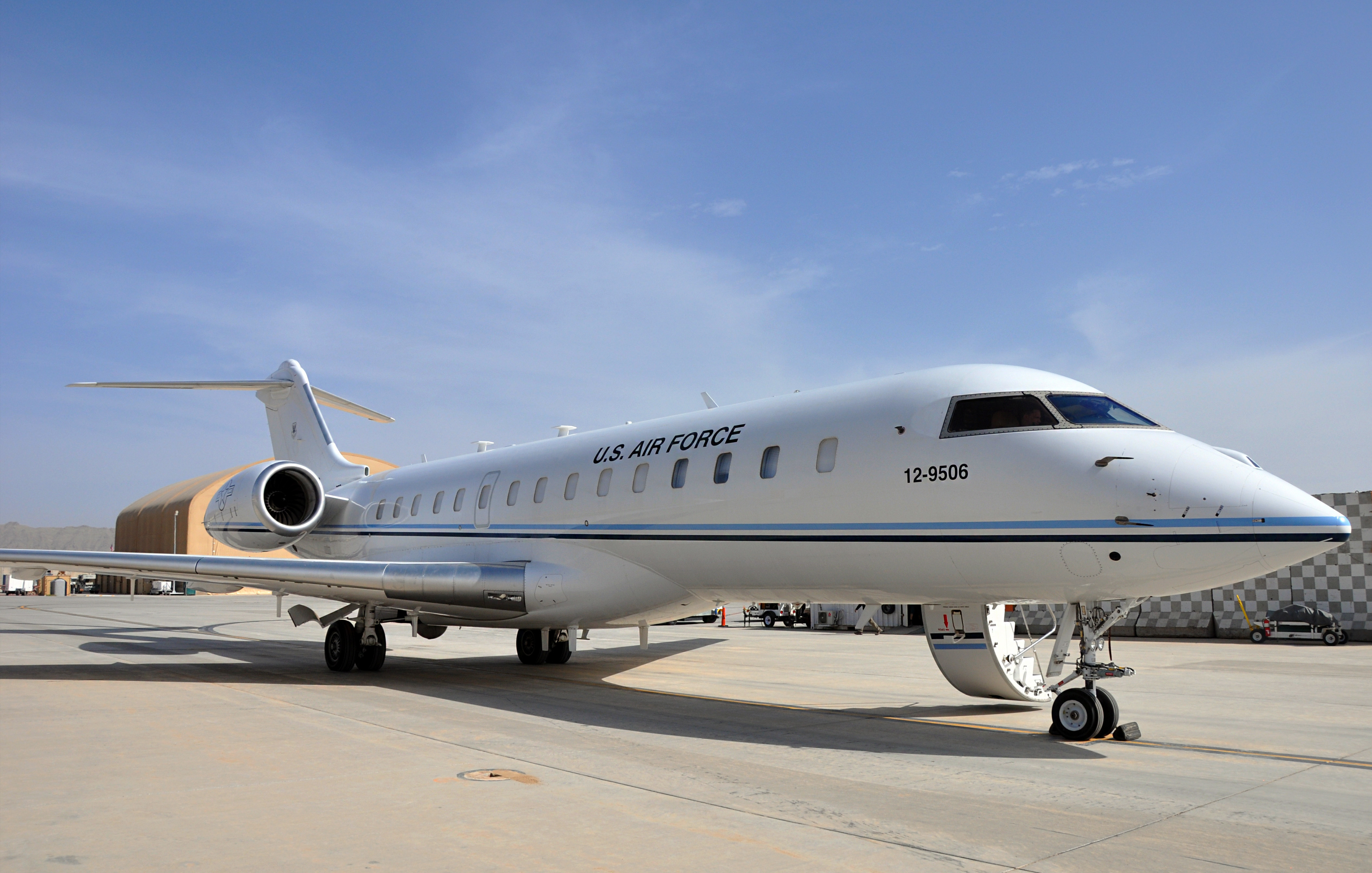
A Bombardier E-11A at Kandahar International Airport in April 2019.

The squadron was redesignated the 430th Expeditionary Electronic Combat Squadron on 13 February 2013 and reactivated at Kandahar Airfield, Afghanistan on 20 February 2013, when it replaced the 451st Air Expeditionary Wing's tactical airborne gateway, which had been operating since 2006. The unit flies the Northrop Grumman E-11 aircraft. The mission of the E-11A is to serve as a Battlefield Airborne Communications Node, a communications system that provides voice and data connectivity across the battlespace for air and surface operators.

On 27 January 2020, a United States Air Force E-11A aircraft (serial number 11–9358) belonging to 430th Expeditionary Electronic Combat Squadron crashed in Afghanistan's Dih Yak District, Ghazni Province. Two people on board were killed, the whole crew according to US military sources. The Taliban claimed to have shot the aircraft down.

== Lineage ==
- Constituted as the 430th Fighter Squadron on 26 May 1943

Activated on 1 August 1943
Inactivated on 7 December 1945

- Redesignated 430th Fighter-Bomber Squadron on 25 June 1952

Activated on 10 July 1952
Redesignated 430th Tactical Fighter Squadron on 1 July 1958
Inactivated on 15 November 1966
Activated on 15 September 1968
Inactivated on 30 September 1989

- Redesignated 430th Electronic Combat Squadron and activated 1 August 1992

Inactivated 29 June 1993

- Redesignated 430th Expeditionary Electronic Combat Squadron and converted to provisional status on 13 March 2013
- Activated 20 February 2013

=== Assignments ===
- 474th Fighter Group, 1 August 1943 – 7 December 1945
- 474th Fighter-Bomber Group, 10 July 1952 (attached to 58th Fighter-Bomber Wing 1 April 1953 – 22 November 1954)
- 474th Fighter-Bomber Wing (later 474th Tactical Fighter Wing), 8 Oct 1957 – 15 November 1966
- 4531 Tactical Fighter Wing, 15 November 1966 - 15 September 1968
- 474th Tactical Fighter Wing, 15 September 1968 – 1 July 1989
- 27th Operations Group, 1 August 1992 – 29 June 1993
- 451st Expeditionary Operations Group, 20 February 2013
- 451st Air Expeditionary Group, 1 April 2014 – present

=== Stations ===
- Glendale Airport, California, 1 August 1943
- Van Nuys Airport, California, 11 October 1943
- Oxnard Flight Strip, California, 5 January – 6 February 1944
- RAF Warmwell (AAF-454), England, 12 March 1944
- Saint-Lambert Airfield (A-11), France, 6 August 1944
- Saint Marceau Airfield (A-43), France, 29 August 1944
- Peronne Airfield (A-72), France, 6 September 1944
- Florennes/Juzaine Airfield (A-78), Belgium, 1 October 1944
- Strassfeld Airfield (Y-59), Germany, 22 March 1945
- Langansalza Airfield (R-2), Germany, 22 April 1945
- AAF Station Schweinfurt, Germany, 16 June 1945
- AAF Station Stuttgart/Echterdingen, Germany, 25 October – 21 November 1945
- Camp Kilmer, New Jersey, 6–8 December 1945
- Misawa Air Base, Japan, 10 July 1952
- Kunsan Air Base (K-8), South Korea, 10 July 1952
- Taegu Air Base (K-2), South Korea, 1 April 1953 – 22 November 1954
- Clovis Air Force Base, New Mexico, 13 December 1954 – 15 November 1966
- Nellis Air Force Base, Nevada, 15 September 1968 – 30 September 1989
- Cannon Air Force Base, New Mexico, 1 August 1992 – 29 June 1993
- Kandahar Airfield, Afghanistan, 20 February 2013 – 16 August 2021

=== Aircraft ===
- P-38 Lightning, 1943–1945
- F-84 Thunderjet, 1952–1954
- F-86 Sabre, 1955–1957
- F-100 Super Sabre, 1957–1965
- General Dynamics F-111, 1969–1977
- F-4 Phantom, 1977–1982
- F-16 Fighting Falcon, 1982–1989
- EC-130 Hercules, 1992–1993
- General Dynamics EF-111 Raven, 1992–1993
- Bombardier E-11A, 2013–present

=== Commanders ===
- Maj Leon B. Temple, 1 Aug 1943
- Unkn, 7 Jun 1944
- Maj Ralph C. Embrey, 9 Jun 1944
- Capt Edward A. McGough III, Oct 1944
- Maj John E. Hatch Jr., Nov 1944
- Maj Edward A. McGough III, Feb 1945
- Maj James L. Doyle, Feb 1945
- Lt Col Arvis L. Hilpert, 23 Aug-unkn 1945
- Lt Col Ellis W. Wright Jr., 10 Jul 1952
- Lt Col Frank B. Culver III, 4 Sep 1952
- Lt Col James M. Jones Jr., c. 1953-unkn
- Lt Col John E. Vogt, unkn-c. 1955
- Maj Robert L. Bobbett, 1955
- Capt William D. Adams, 1955
- Lt Col Bernie S. Bass, 3 Oct 1955
- Lt Col Emmett E. McClarren, 11 Jan 1956
- Lt Col Jake L. Wilk Jr., 2 Sep 1957
- Maj Robert E. Erickspon, c. 1960
- Lt Col Joseph S. Michalowski, 1961
- Maj Robert L. Herman, 14 Mar 1962
- Maj Emmett G. Saxon, 15 Dec 1963
- Maj Edward Hernandez, 3 Apt 1964
- Lt Col Robert L. Herman, 1 Aug 1964-unkn
- Unkn, 15 Sep 1965-22 Feb 1967
- Lt Col Lloyd O. Hawkins, 23 Feb 1967-15 Sep 1968
- Lt Col Robert K. Crouch, c. 16 Sep 1968
- Lt Col William R. Powers, 25 Jun 1970
- Lt Col James D. Black, 13 Apr 1972
- Lt Col John O. Hanford, 18 Jun 1972
- Lt Col Eugene F. Martin, 30 Jun 1972
- Lt Col Richard A. Flietz, 26 Apr 1974
- Lt Col Robert Wagner, Jun 1977
- Lt Col Gary E. Cox, 1 Mar 1979
- Lt Col Walter T. West, 28 Feb 1981
- Lt Col John P. Jumper, 1 Mar 1983
- Lt Col T. Ryan Torkelson, 14 Jun 1983
- Lt Col James E. Sandstrom, 28 Jun 1985
- Lt Col Michael Voss,1 May 1987
- Lt Col Michael R. Scott, 7 Oct 1988-1 Jul 1989
- Lt Col R. Larry Brough, 1 Aug 1992-29 Jun 1993
