= 429th Electronic Combat Squadron =

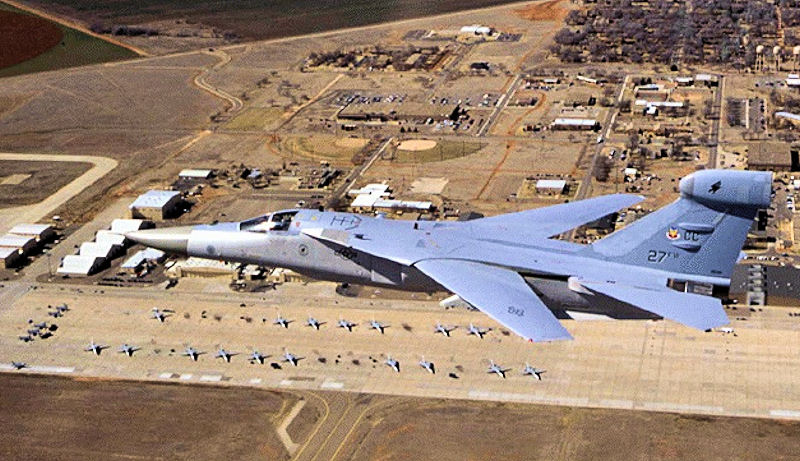
- 429th EF-111 over Cannon AFB (Note: The aircraft is a General Dynamics EF-111A Raven serial 66-35.)
- Active: 1943–1945; 1952–1966; 1968–1989; 1992–1998
- Country: United States
- Branch: United States Air Force
- Role: Electronic combat
- Part of: Air Combat Command
- Nickname(s): Black Falcons
- Engagements: European Theater of Operations; Korean War; Vietnam War
- Decorations: Distinguished Unit Citation; Air Force Outstanding Unit Award with Combat "V" Device; Air Force Outstanding Unit Award; Belgian Fourragère; Republic of Korea Presidential Unit Citation; Vietnamese Gallantry Cross with Palm

Insignia
- 429th Electronic Combat Squadron emblem (approved 5 November 1987)

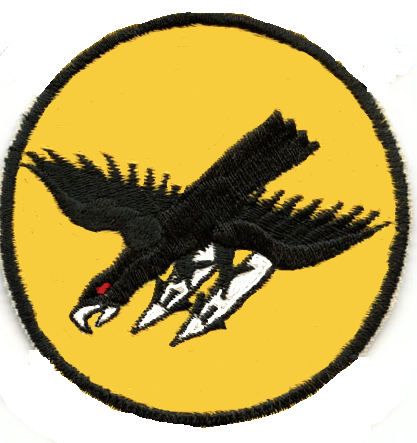
- 429th Fighter-Bomber Squadron emblem (approved 7 July 1955)

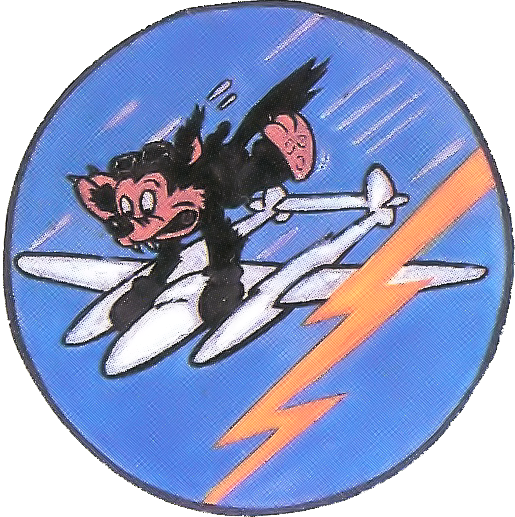
- 429th Fighter Squadron emblem (approved 28 February 1944)

The 429th Electronic Combat Squadron is an inactive United States Air Force unit. It was first activated in August 1943 and participated in conflicts including World War II, the Korean War, the Cuban Missile Crisis, and the Vietnam War.

The 429th Fighter Squadron, nicknamed "The Retail Gang", was first activated during World War II as part of the 474th Fighter Group and served in the European Theater of Operations, where it earned a Distinguished Unit Citation and the Belgian Fourragère for its actions in combat. It remained in Europe after V-E Day, returning to the United States, where it was inactivated at the port of embarkation in December 1945.

The squadron was reactivated as the 429th Fighter-Bomber Squadron in 1952 as part of the 474th Fighter Bomber Wing and later the 474th Fighter Bomber Group, when it replaced an Air National Guard squadron in Japan. It again saw combat in the Korean War, earning another Distinguished Unit Citation and a Republic of Korea Presidential Unit Citation. The Squadron returned to the United States in 1954.

The 429th Tactical Fighter Squadron was deployed as part of the 474th Tactical Fighter Wing in September 1972 to Thailand to fly combat missions in the Vietnam War, and was awarded the Air Force Outstanding Unit Award with Combat "V" Device 28 Sep 1972-22 Feb 1973 and Republic of Vietnam Gallantry Cross with Palm 28 Sep 1972-22 Feb 1973. It remained a fighter unit until inactivating in 1989. It was last assigned to the 27th Operations Group and stationed at Cannon Air Force Base, New Mexico before its final inactivation in June 1998. The squadron was both one of the first USAF units to fly the General Dynamics F-111 Aardvark and the last unit to do so.

== History ==
=== World War II ===
The unit was activated in August 1943 as a Lockheed P-38 Lightning fighter squadron under IV Fighter Command in Southern California. It trained with the fighter over the Mojave Desert, before moving to the European Theater of Operations and being assigned to the Ninth Air Force in England during March 1944.

The unit's first combat operations began in April 1944 and involved making low level sweeps over Occupied France, attacking enemy transportation targets and military convoys, bridges, armor formations and airfields. During D-Day, the squadron flew patrols over the invasion fleet. It remained in England after D-Day until August, then moved to France where it primarily provided ground-air support to the United States First Army in Northern France. At the end of the war, the unit moved to Occupied Germany, becoming part of the United States Air Forces in Europe army of occupation during the summer of 1945.

Personnel demobilized in Europe during 1945 and returned to the United States in November as an administrative unit, and was inactivated without personnel or equipment.

=== Cold War ===
The unit was reactivated in Japan under the Far East Air Forces in July 1952 as a result of the Korean War. It replaced a federalized Georgia Air National Guard unit and received Republic F-84G Thunderjets. It moved to South Korea in August, engaging in combat operations from Kunsan Air Base (K-8). From Kunsan, the squadron bombed and strafed bridges, bunkers, troop concentrations, artillery positions, and a host of other enemy targets

It moved to Taegu Air Base (K-2) in April 1953 and attached to the 58th Fighter-Bomber Wing. It flew interdiction and close air support missions, as well as attacking special strategic targets such as military schools, dams, and port facilities in North Korea until the June 1953 Armistice. The unit remained in South Korea for over a year afterward to ensure Communist compliance with the cease-fire.

After returning to Clovis Air Force Base, New Mexico in November 1954, the squadron was re-equipped with North American F-86H Sabre fighter-bomber aircraft and assigned to the Twelfth Air Force, Tactical Air Command. It maintained proficiency in tactical fighter operations, deploying components, aircraft, and crews on a global basis in support of NATO, PACAF, AAC, and other organizations. It later deployed to southeastern United States during the Cuban Missile Crisis of 1962.

The unit moved to Nellis Air Force Base, Nevada in 1966, where it became one of the first General Dynamics F-111 squadrons finally reaching operational status in 1971.

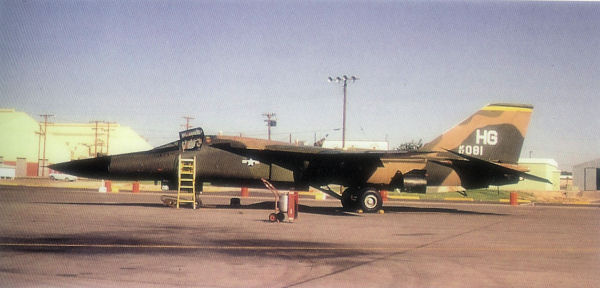
429th F-111A at Nellis AFB (Note: The aircraft is a General Dynamics F-111A Aardvark, serial 67–81, taken after its return from Korat RTAFB in 1975. The aircraft still has the 347th Wing "HG" tailcode.)

The unit deployed to Takhli Royal Thai Air Force Base, Thailand in early 1972 as a result of the North Vietnamese Easter Offensive. It fully engaged in combat over North and South Vietnam, flying operations in good and bad weather when other squadrons were grounded. It flew approximately 4,000 combat missions with excellent success rates at hitting targets even when visibility was near zero. The unit returned to the United States in March 1973, leaving its assigned aircraft at Takhli.

Almost immediately upon the squadron's return to Nellis, it was reassigned to the 347th Tactical Fighter Wing and deployed back to Takhli, this time being placed on permanent party status in Thailand, taking over the aircraft it had left upon its return to the United States. The 347th flew combat operations over Cambodia for a brief two-week period until 15 August, when the last wartime mission of the Vietnam era was flown over Cambodia. The wing was maintained in a combat-ready status for possible contingency.

After the end of combat missions in Indochina and the closure of Takhli, the squadron moved to Korat Royal Thai Air Force Base, Thailand in 1974 and remained in Southeast Asia through May 1975 to undertake strike missions in the event of further contingency operations. It participated in numerous exercises and firepower demonstrations and, during January–May 1975, flew sea surveillance missions. It participated in the Mayaguez Incident against Cambodian Khmer Rouge forces in May 1975.

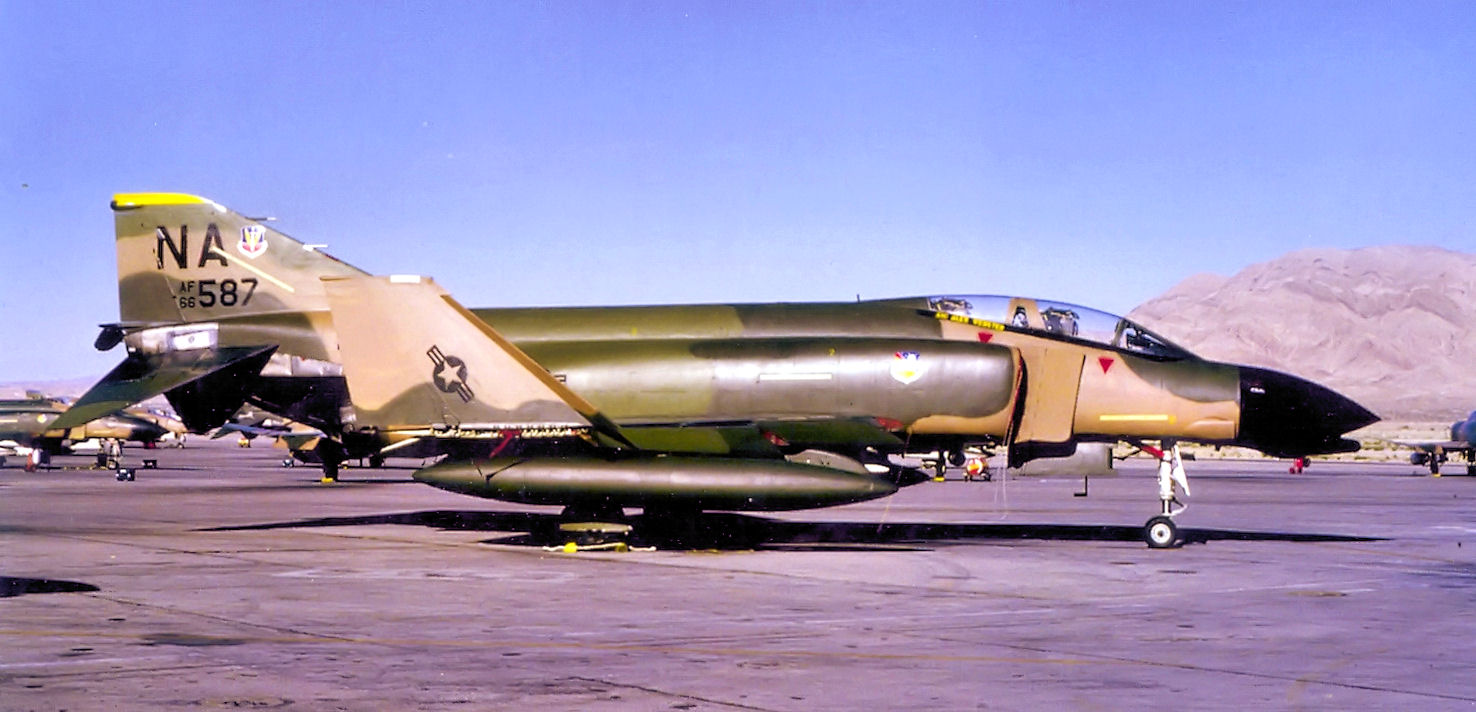
429th F-4D Phantom (Note: The aircraft is a McDonnell F-4D, serial 66-7587, taken about 1979.)

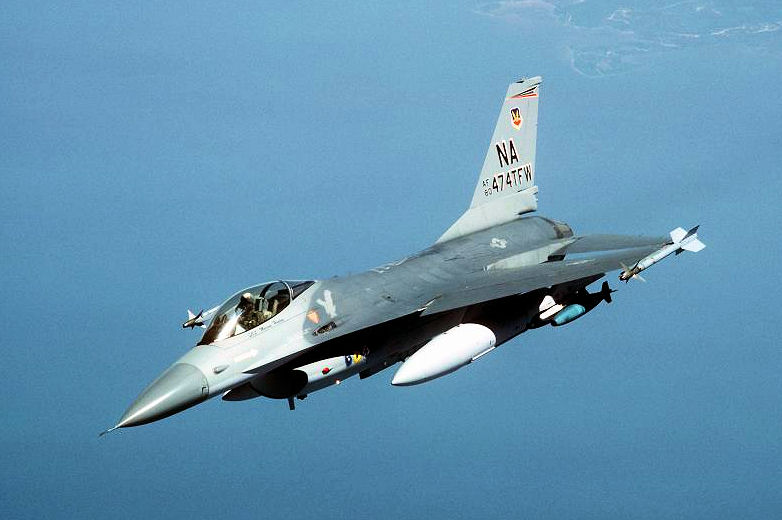
429th F-16A in May 1987 (Note: The aircraft is a General Dynamics F-16A Block 10B Fighting Falcon, serial 80-474.)

Upon its return to the United States, the squadron was reassigned to the 474th Wing, sent F-111s to the 366th Tactical Fighter Wing at Mountain Home Air Force Base, and changed equipment to the McDonnell F-4D Phantom II during Operation Ready Switch. It received new Block 1/5 General Dynamics F-16 Fighting Falcon aircraft in November 1980 after a protracted development period in the 1970s. The squadron conducted routine Tactical Air Command training and deployments from Nellis with the F-16s, upgrading to Block 10/15 models in the early 1980s. It was inactivated in September 1989 when aircraft were considered to no longer be front-line combat capable.

=== Electronic warfare ===
The squadron was reactivated in 1992 at Mountain Home Air Force Base, Idaho, and equipped with the new General Dynamics EF-111A Raven electronic warfare aircraft. It moved to Cannon Air Force Base, New Mexico in 1993, taking over the aircraft of the 430th Electronic Combat Squadron when the EF-111 fleet was consolidated there. The squadron engaged in operations with the Raven during the 1990s, as the only Raven unit in the Air Force.

The squadron flew electronic warfare jamming missions over the Balkans and Iraq, with 2,780 days and 32 rotations in continuous support of Operation Southern Watch. The United States Air Force officially retired the EF-111A in June 1998, and as a result of the retirement, the squadron was inactivated on 19 June 1998. The last USAF F-111s were retired to the Aerospace Maintenance and Regeneration Center.

== Lineage ==
- Constituted as the 429th Fighter Squadron on 26 May 1943
  - Activated on 1 August 1943
  - Inactivated on 7 December 1945
- Redesignated 429th Fighter-Bomber Squadron on 25 June 1952
  - Activated on 10 July 1952
  - Redesignated 429th Tactical Fighter Squadron on 1 July 1958
  - Inactivated 15 November 1966
  - Activated 15 September 1968
  - Inactivated 30 September 1989
- Redesignated 429th Electronic Combat Squadron on 1 August 1992
  - Activated on 11 September 1992
  - Inactivated on 19 June 1998

=== Assignments ===
- 474th Fighter Group, 1 August 1943 – 7 December 1945
- 474th Fighter-Bomber Group, 10 July 1952 – 22 November 1954 (attached to 58th Fighter-Bomber Wing, 1 April 1953 – 22 November 1954)
- 474th Fighter-Bomber Wing (later 474th Tactical Fighter Wing), 8 October 1957 – 15 November 1966
- 474th Tactical Fighter Wing, 15 September 1968
- 347th Tactical Fighter Wing, 30 July 1973
- 474th Tactical Fighter Wing, 21 June 1975 – 30 September 1989
- 366th Operations Group, 11 September 1992
- 27th Operations Group, 22 June 1993 – 19 June 1998

=== Stations ===
- Glendale Airport, California, 1 August 1943
- Van Nuys Airport, California, 11 October 1943
- Oxnard Flight Strip, California, 5 January – 6 February 1944
- RAF Warmwell (AAF-454), England, 12 March 1944
- Saint-Lambert Airfield (A-11), France, 6 August 1944
- Saint Marceau Airfield (A-43), France, 29 August 1944
- Peronne Airfield (A-72), France, 6 September 1944
- Florennes/Juzaine Airfield (A-78), Belgium, 1 October 1944
- Strassfeld Airfield (Y-59), Germany, 22 March 1945
- Langansalza Airfield (R-2), Germany, 22 April 1945
- AAF Station Schweinfurt, Germany, 16 June 1945
- AAF Station Stuttgart/Echterdingen, Germany, 25 October–21 November 1945
- Camp Kilmer, New Jersey, 6–8 December 1945
- Misawa Air Base, Japan, 10 July 1952
- Kunsan Air Base (K-8), South Korea, 10 July 1952
- Taegu Air Base (K-2), South Korea, 1 April 1953 – 22 November 1954
- Clovis Air Force Base (later Cannon Air Force Base), New Mexico, 13 December 1954 – 15 November 1966

Deployed to: Bien Hoa Air Base, South Vietnam, 13 July–December 1965

- Nellis Air Force Base, Nevada, 15 September 1968
- Takhli Royal Thai Air Force Base, Thailand, 30 July 1973
- Korat Royal Thai Air Force Base, Thailand, 12 July 1974
- Nellis Air Force Base, Nevada, 21 June 1975 – 30 September 1989
- Mountain Home Air Force Base, Idaho, 11 September 1992
- Cannon Air Force Base, New Mexico, 22 June 1993 – 19 June 1998

=== Aircraft ===
- Lockheed P-38 Lightning, 1943–1945
- Republic F-84 Thunderjet, 1952–1954
- North American F-86 Sabre, 1955–1957
- North American F-100 Super Sabre, 1957–1965
- General Dynamics F-111 Aardvark, 1969–1977
- McDonnell F-4 Phantom II, 1977–1982
- General Dynamics F-16 Fighting Falcon, 1982–1989
- Lockheed EC-130 Hercules, 1993–1998
- General Dynamics EF-111 Raven, 1992–1998
