= 422d Test and Evaluation Squadron =

US Air Force unit

422d Test and Evaluation Squadron

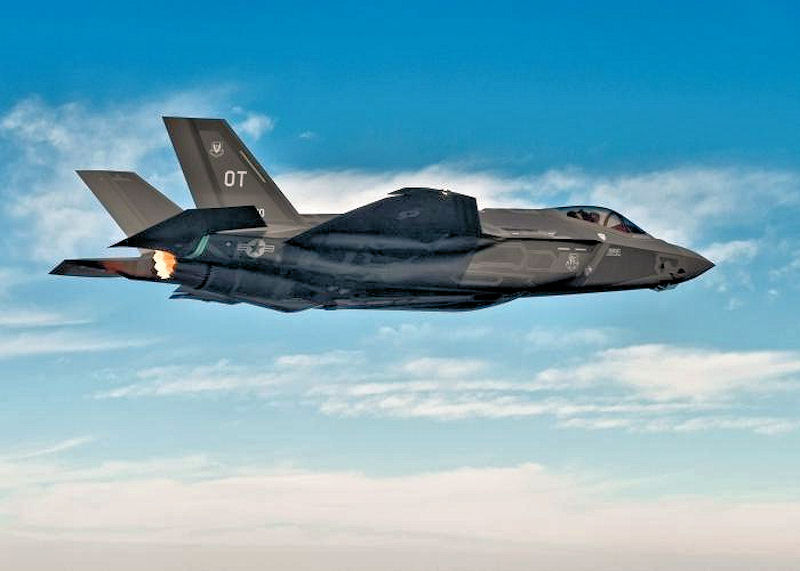
- Squadron F-35A Lightning II (Note: Aircraft is Lockheed Martin F-35A Lightning II, serial 10-5020)
- Active: 1943–1945; 1969–present
- Country: United States
- Branch: United States Air Force
- Type: Squadron
- Role: Operational testing
- Part of: Air Combat Command
- Garrison/HQ: Nellis Air Force Base, Nevada
- Engagements: World War II EAME Theatre

- Decorations: Distinguished Unit Citation (2x); Air Force Outstanding Unit Award (4x)

Insignia
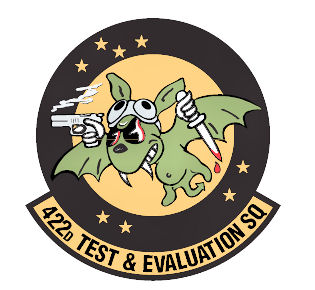
- 422d Test and Evaluation Squadron emblem (Note: Approved 29 December 1943.)

The 422d Test and Evaluation Squadron is a United States Air Force unit. It is assigned to the 53d Test and Evaluation Group, stationed at Nellis Air Force Base, Nevada. The squadron performs operational testing of all fighter aircraft and munitions entering and in operational use by Air Combat Command.

The unit was originally formed as the 422d Night Fighter Squadron in 1943. After training in the United States, it was deployed to Ninth Air Force in England in the spring of 1944, prior to the D-Day landings in France. During the run-up to D-Day, the squadron trained with Royal Air Force night fighter units against Luftwaffe raiders who intruded the night skies over England. It was the first American squadron in England equipped with the Northrop P-61 Black Widow night fighter. After the landings in France, the mission of the squadron became the air defense of Allied liberated territory. During the Battle of the Bulge, it also flew day and night interdiction missions against enemy troop movements, bridges and other targets of opportunity. It was inactivated shortly after the war in Europe ended.

In 1969, the squadron was reactivated at Nellis Air Force Base by Tactical Air Command to provide combat evaluation and operational testing of new USAF aircraft entering the inventory after developmental testing was completed at Edwards Air Force Base.

== Overview ==
The 422d Test and Evaluation Squadron is a geographically separated unit of the 53d Test and Evaluation Group, home stationed at Eglin Air Force Base, Florida. It is the most diverse-equipped aircraft squadron in the United States Air Force.

After a new fighter weapons system completes developmental testing at either Edwards Air Force Base, California, or at Eglin, the mission of the 422d TES to thoroughly vet the new equipment in a combat representative environment. This task is essential, as the lives of pilots and other aircrew will depend upon the performance of any new system during actual combat operations.

The 422d TES is a composite squadron that currently includes the A-10 Thunderbolt II, McDonnell Douglas F-15C Eagle, McDonnell Douglas F-15E Strike Eagle, General Dynamics F-16 Fighting Falcon, and Lockheed Martin F-35 Lightning II. Testing and evaluation includes the aircraft hardware, engines, software, and weapons upgrades prior to release of the aircraft or modification to operational Air Combat Command operational units.

In addition to its operational testing mission, the 422d TES is also responsible for the development and testing of new tactics for the USAF. The squadron develops new tactics to employ weapons systems in combat as part of its operational testing role. Additionally, the unit also works on developing new tactics to counter emerging threat weapons systems as intelligence becomes available.

When developing new tactics, the 422nd TES works closely with the USAF Weapons School. However, ultimately, the 422d TES is responsible for the development and testing of all new tactics for every CAF fighter Mission Design Series. The squadron supports other mission areas, to include foreign materiel exploitation and field visits to instruct operational aircrews on new systems and tactics.

=== Current Divisions ===
- A-10 Division

Established 1977. Conducts a special evaluation of night vision modified cockpits to determine optimum compatibility with night combat operations. They also examined night medium altitude operations to determine the best suited tactics to expand the A-10's night close air support capabilities. In 1997 the A-10 Division conducted an extensive evaluation of close air support tactics for use in urban war zones.

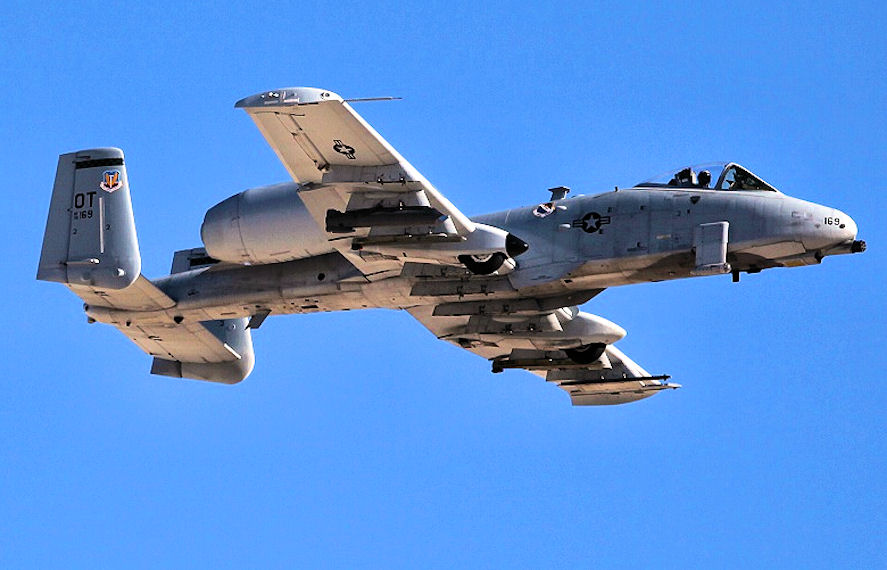
A-10 Division 79-0169

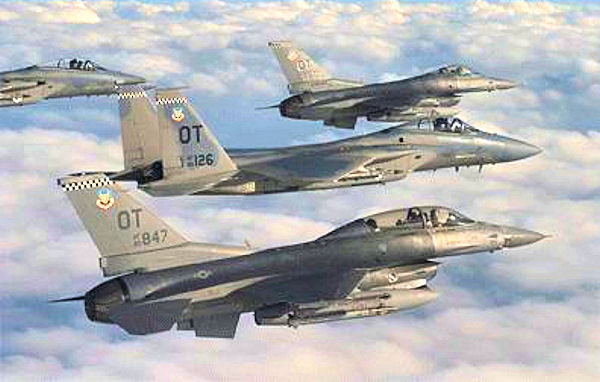
Squadron F-15s and F-16s in flight

- F-15 Division

Established 1977 as F-15A Division, F-15C in 1982. Division was at the forefront of night air superiority as they evaluated night composite force tactics. They also developed and evaluated night vision goggle tactics for the F-15C Eagle, a first for this aircraft in the active Air Force.

- F-15E Division

Established 1989. Developed new methods of employing the LANTIRN system in a counter-offensive air-to-air role. The F-15E division aircrews also became the first in the Air Force to employ Night Vision Goggles, as they developed and evaluated new tactics in night combat search and rescue.

- F-16 Division

Established 1980 as F-16A Division, F-16C in 1985. Evaluated Night Vision Goggle employment in several missions, including night combat search and rescue, along with various NVG compatible cockpit configurations. In January 1997 422 TES F-16 pilots evaluated and dropped the first live Joint Direct Attack Munition.

- F-22 Division

Established 2004 for testing and evaluation of the F-22A Raptor.

- F-35 Division

Established September 2013 for testing and evaluation of the F-35A Lightning II.

Aircraft tail code initially was "WF" upon formation of the squadron in 1969. Recoded to "WA" in October 1971 with yellow/black checkerboard tail stripe. Recoded 1 October 1996 to "OT" tail code, with a green/black checkerboard tail flash.

== History ==
=== World War II ===
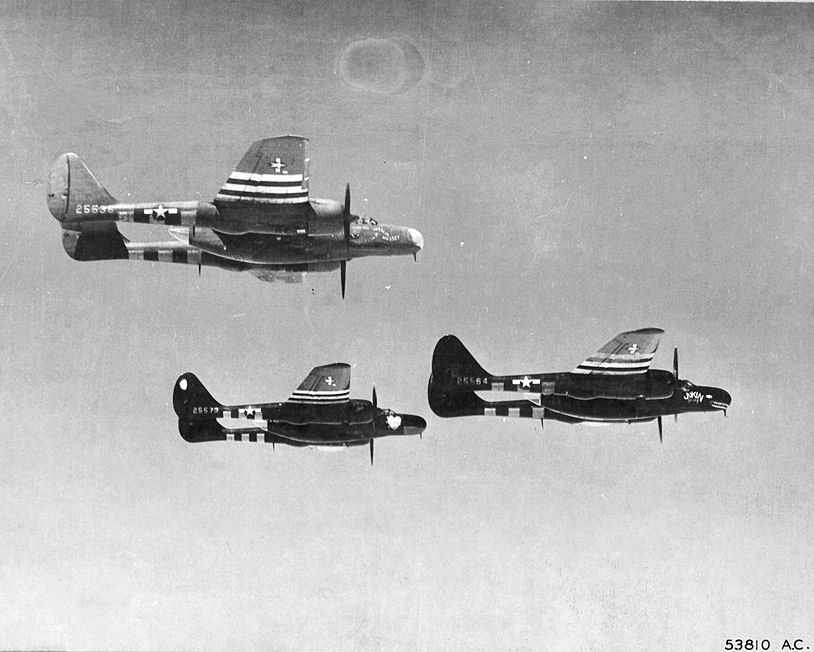
422d NFS P-61 Black Widows on patrol over the landing beaches in Normandy on D-Day, on alert for any Luftwaffe aircraft

The squadron was established on 1 August 1943 as the 422d Night Fighter Squadron at Orlando Army Air Base, Florida. The 422d was the first of the third group of dedicated night fighter squadrons trained by the Army Air Forces It initially trained with the Douglas P-70 Havoc night fighter at Orlando, although later that fall the squadron began to train with service test models of the Northrop P-61 Black Widow. In January, training was interrupted when the night fighter school was moved from Florida to Hammer Field, California. After the relocation, the squadron completed its training in March 1944

The 422d was the first night fighter squadron to be assigned to Ninth Air Force in England. RAF Charmy Down eventually would become the home of three night fighter squadrons (422d, 423d, and 424th Night Fighter Squadron), however the squadron arrived un-equipped as the P-61 Black Widows were late in arriving. Subsequently, the squadron had its aircrews posted to various Royal Air Force night fighter and signal schools for theater indoctrination. Meanwhile, as there was no sign of the P-61s. the pilots kept up their flight time on Cessna UC-78 Bobcats and de Havilland Mosquitoes.

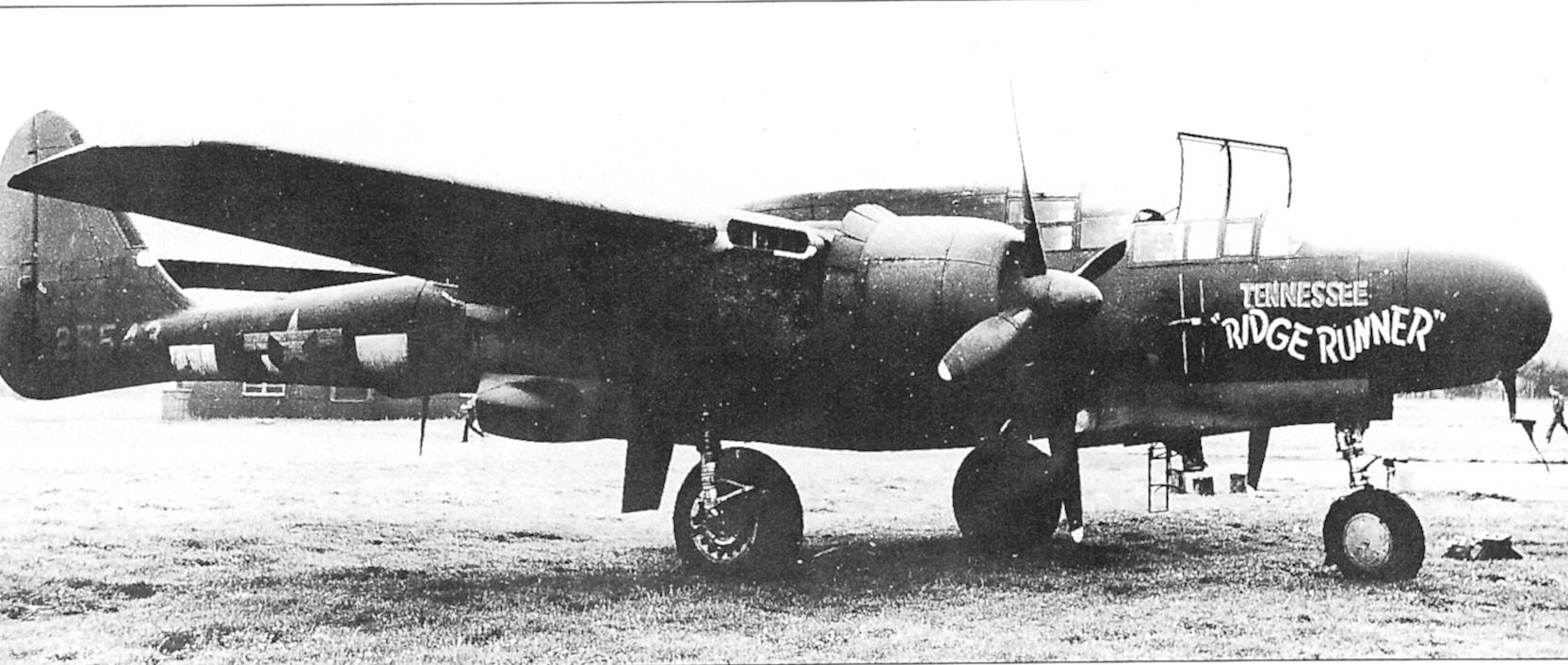
Tennessee Ridge Runner P-61 42–25543 at an ALG in France or the Low Countries, Fall 1944

The squadron moved to RAF Scorton on 6 May. The original plan had been for all three night fighter squadrons to be on combat status with P-61s by D-Day, however the first P-61 didn't arrive until the end of May, about two weeks before the planned invasion of France. With the arrival of the German V-1 flying bombs over England after the invasion, the squadron trained with their Black Widows by intercepting the flying bombs. The first Black Widow V-1 "kill" took place on 16 July 1944, credited to pilot Herman Ernst and radar operator Edward Kopsel of the 422nd Night Fighter Squadron. One of the greatest dangers involved in killing V-1s was the possibility of getting too close to the flying bomb when one fired at it, running the risk of damage to their own plane if the bomb exploded when hit.

Finally, on 25 July, a month and a half after D-Day, the squadron was considered to be operationally ready for night interception and moved up to Maupertu Airfield (A-15) in France. From Maupertu the squadron entered combat and began to perform night interception of intruding Luftwaffe bombers and night fighters. As the number of enemy night intruders was small, the squadron also performed offensive interdictionary attacks on Axis forces in France and the Low Countries 1944, moving eastward through a series of Advanced Landing Grounds until operating from captured Luftwaffe bases in Germany during the spring of 1945.

The squadron ended combat operations in May 1945 and became part of the Army of Occupation until August 1945. Demobilized in Europe, aircraft flown back to the United States for storage or use with postwar All Weather Air Defense Command interceptor squadrons.

=== Weapons testing ===
The unit was reactivated in 1969 as the 422d Fighter Weapons Squadron when it replaced the 4539th Fighter Weapons Squadron at Nellis Air Force Base, Nevada.

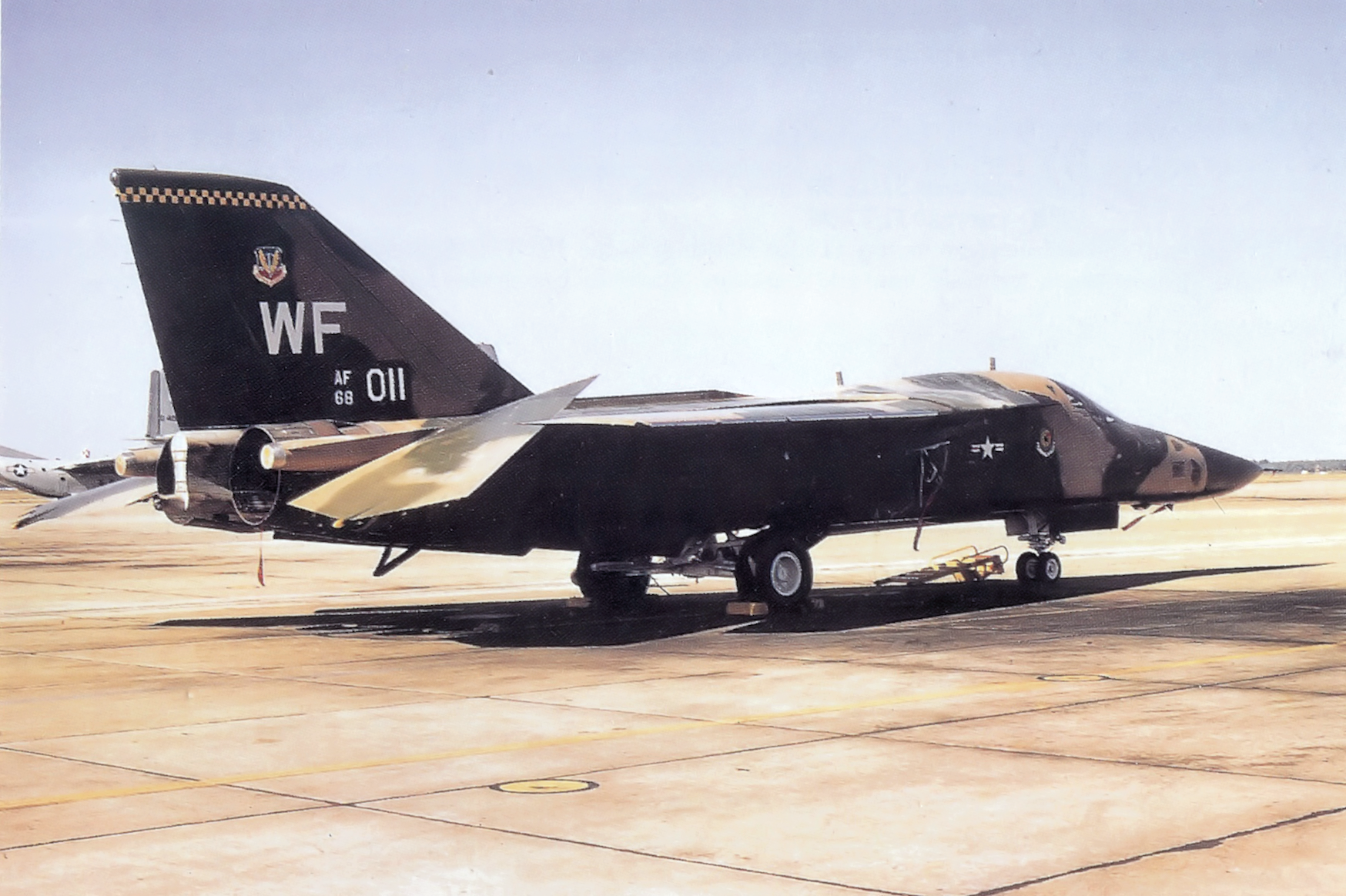
Squadron F-111E 68–0011 at Nellis in 1971

Its initial primary mission was the operational test and evaluation of General Dynamics F-111 Aardvark aircraft. Took over F-111As of 4539th Combat Crew Training Squadron, aircraft tail coded "WF". In 1977, F-111 testing ended at Nellis and was relocated to McClellan Air Force Base, California, as Detachment 3, 57th Fighter Weapons Wing. McClellan was the Air Force Logistics Command prime support depot for the F-111 and changes and modifications could be made there and tested by the detachment. The 431st Test and Evaluation Squadron was activated at McClellan in 1980, replacing the detachment and remained active until June 1992 when the F-111D was retired.

In 1971 the McDonnell F-4 Phantom II joined the squadron; LTV A-7D Corsair IIs were added in 1972, and were flown until 1975. A-10 and F-15 aircraft were added in 1977, as were F-16As in 1980. In 1982 the 422 Fighter Weapons Squadron's name changed to the 422d Test and Evaluation Squadron (TES), to better reflect its role.

In 1985, the F-4E was retired from the 422 TES. During this time, the F-16C began testing at Luke Air Force Base, Arizona, as the 57th Fighter Weapons Wing, Det 1. In October 1987, Det 1 was closed at Luke, and its aircraft were moved to Nellis. This gave the 422 TES an aircraft complement of A-10s, F-15s, F-16As, and F-16Cs.

1989 saw the rapid expansion of squadron capability with the addition of the F-15E and F-16C Low Altitude Navigation Targeting Infrared for Night (LANTIRN) aircraft. With these two systems, the 422 TES greatly expanded its ability to fly night tactical missions.

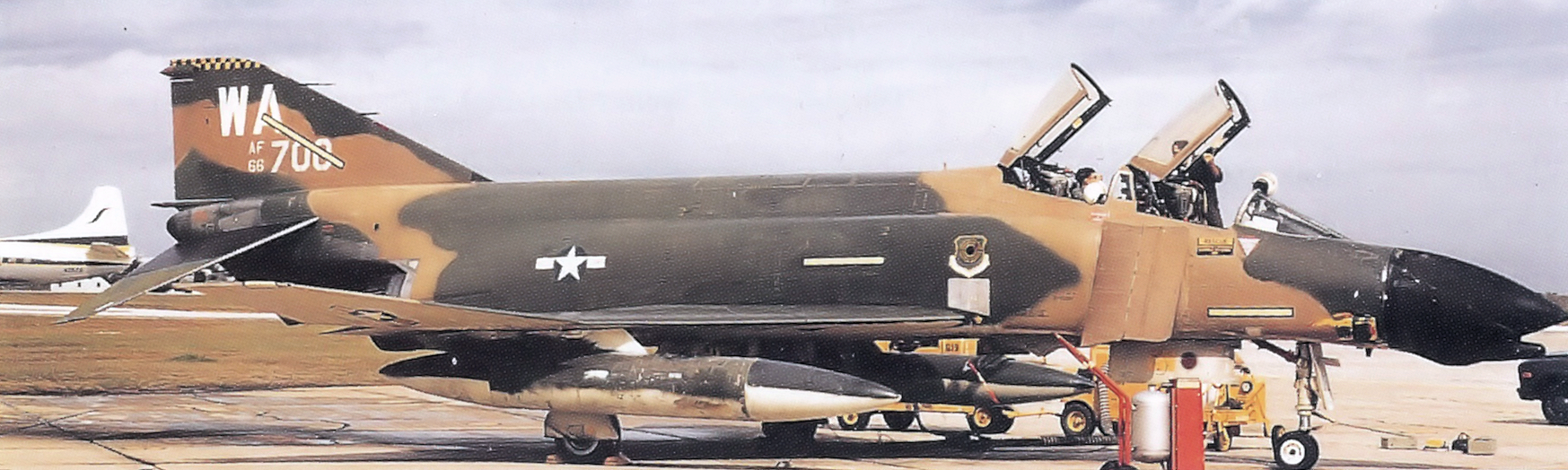
F-4 Division F-4D Phantom II 66–8700 in 1975

1991 began with Operation Desert Storm. Although the 422 TES did not deploy for direct participation, it was involved in several quick look evaluations of equipment and employment tactics which directly enhanced the effectiveness of the air war. The efforts of the 422 TES over the past ten years to improve weapons, avionics, and tactics provided the ultimate reward: a quick and decisive victory.

The 422 TES began 1993 with the return of a veteran aircraft to the lineup. The F-4G Wild Weasel officially became part of the testing program at Nellis on 1 February 1993. The Sikorsky HH-60 Blackhawk helicopter came aboard on 1 July 1995 as the newest member of the 422 TES team. Later that year the F-4 was retired again, as the last test F-4G was flown to the Aerospace Maintenance Regeneration Center in Arizona.

On 1 October 1996, the 422 TES was realigned under the 53d Wing at Eglin Air Force Base, Florida, as the United States Air Force Warfare Center assigned all testing to this wing. The squadron grew to its largest size since World War II when the squadron inherited all test management, advanced programs, and test support from the 57th Test Group.

The mission of the 422d Test and Evaluation Squadron continues to grow in scope and complexity as new aircraft and systems are developed for use in the combat air forces. Recent testing by the 422d Test and Evaluation Squadron has been focused on enhancing mission employment capabilities at night

== Lineage ==
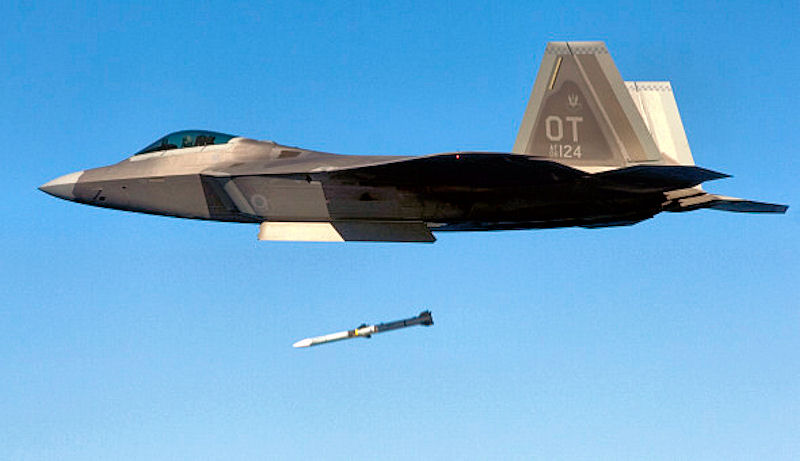
Lockheed Martin F-22A Block 30 Raptor 06-4124

- Constituted as the 422d Night Fighter Squadron on 14 July 1943

Activated on 1 August 1943
Inactivated on 30 September 1945

- Redesignated 422d Fighter Weapons Squadron on 22 August 1969

Activated on 15 October 1969.
Redesignated 422d Test and Evaluation Squadron on 30 December 1981

=== Assignments ===
- Air Defense Department, Army Air Forces School of Applied Tactics, 1 August 1943
- 481st Night Fighter Operational Training Group, 29 October 1943
- AAF Tactical Center, 6 January 1944
- IX Fighter Command, 7 March 1944
- IX Tactical Air Command, 12 March 1944
- 71st Fighter Wing, 4 May 1944
- IX Air Defense Command, 6 August 1944
- IX Tactical Air Command, 7 October 1944 – 30 September 1945
- 57th Fighter Weapons (later, 57th Tactical Training; 57th Fighter Weapons; 57th Fighter) Wing, 15 October 1969
- 57th Test Group, 1 November 1991
- 79th Test and Evaluation Group (later 53d Test and Evaluation Group), 1 August 1997 – present (Note: On 20 November 1998, the 79th Test and Evaluation Group was inactivated and the squadron was reassigned to the new 53rd Test and Evaluation Group. However, on 25 June 2000, the 79th and 53rd Groups were consolidated into a single unit.)

=== Divisions ===
- A-7D Division, 1972–1975
- A-10A/C Division, 1977–present
- F-4E Division, 1971–1985
- F-4G Division, 1993–1995
- F-15A/C Division, 1977–present
- F-15E Division, 1989–present
- F-16A/C Division 1980–present
- F-22A Division, 2004–present
- F-111 Division, 1969–1977
- HH-60 Division, 1995–present
- F-35A Division, 2013–present
- C2 Division, 2008–Present

=== Stations ===
- Orlando Air Base, Florida, 1 August 1943
- Kissimmee AAF, Florida, 3 November 1943
- Orlando Army Air Base, Florida, 6 January–13 February 1944
- RAF Charmy Down (AAF-487), England, 7 March 1944
- RAF Scorton (AAF-425), England, 6 May–25 July 1944

Detachments at RAF Hurn (AAF-492), England, 28 June–11 July 1944; RAF Ford (AAF-362), England, 16–26 July 1944

- Maupertu Airfield (A-15), France, 25 July – 28 August 1944
- Chateaudun Airfield (A-39), France, 28 August 1944
- Florennes/Juzaine Airfield (A-78), Belgium, 16 September 1944
- Strassfeld Airfield (Y-59), Germany, 6 April 1945
- Langansala Airfield (R-2), Germany, 24 April 1945
- AAF Station Kassel/Rothwesten (R-12), Germany, 26 May 1945
- France (unknown locations), August–20 September 1945
- Camp Myles Standish, Massachusetts, 29–30 September 1945
- Nellis Air Force Base, Nevada, 15 October 1969 – present

== Aircraft ==
=== World War II ===
- Douglas DB-7 Boston, 1943
- Douglas P-70 Havoc, 1943
- Northrop YP-61 Black Widow (Service test model), 1943
- Northrop P-61 Black Widow, 1944–1945
- Interstate L-6 Grasshopper, 1944
- Airspeed Oxford, 1944
- Cessna C-78 Bobcat, 1944
- Douglas A-20 Havoc, 1944–1945

=== United States Air Force ===
- General Dynamics F-111 Aardvark, 1969–1977
- McDonnell F-4 Phantom II, 1971–1985
- LTV A-7D Corsair II, 1972–1975
- Fairchild Republic A-10 Thunderbolt II, 1977–present
- McDonnell Douglas F-15 Eagle, 1977–present
- General Dynamics F-16 Fighting Falcon, 1980–present
- McDonnell F-4G Phantom II Wild Weasel, 1993–1995
- Sikorsky HH-60 Blackhawk and Pave Hawk, 1995–2005
- Lockheed Martin F-22 Raptor 2002–present
- Lockheed Martin F-35 Lightning II, 2012–present

== See also ==
- 481st Night Fighter Operational Training Group
