= 474th Air Expeditionary Group =

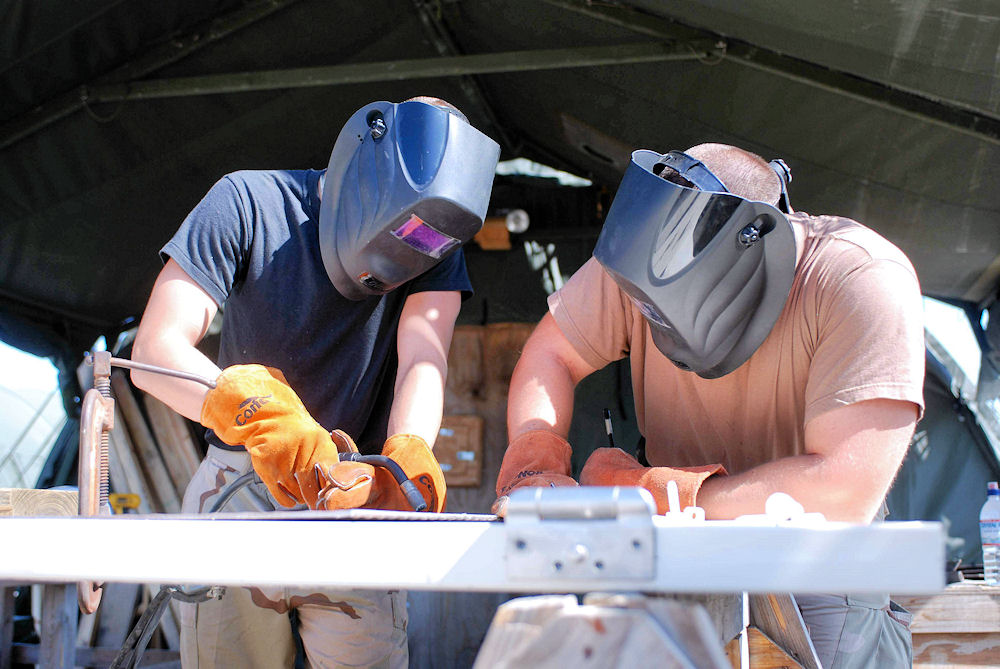
- A group civil engineer puts the finishing touches on a sun shade outside the Expeditionary Legal Complex 16 January 2007 at Guantanamo Bay, Cuba. (Note: Members of the Joint Task Force Guantanamo's 474th Expeditionary Civil Engineering Squadron structures team completed several construction projects around Naval Station Guantanamo Bay. JTF Guantanamo conducts care and custody of detained enemy combatants, including those convicted by military commission and those ordered released.)
- Active: 1943–1945; 1952–1958; 2004–unknown
- Country: United States
- Branch: United States Air Force
- Role: Expeditionary support
- Part of: Air Combat Command
- Engagements: European Theater of Operations; Korean War
- Decorations: Distinguished Unit Citation; Belgian Fourragère; Republic of Korea Presidential Unit Citation

Commanders
- Notable commanders: Colonel John S. Loisel

Insignia
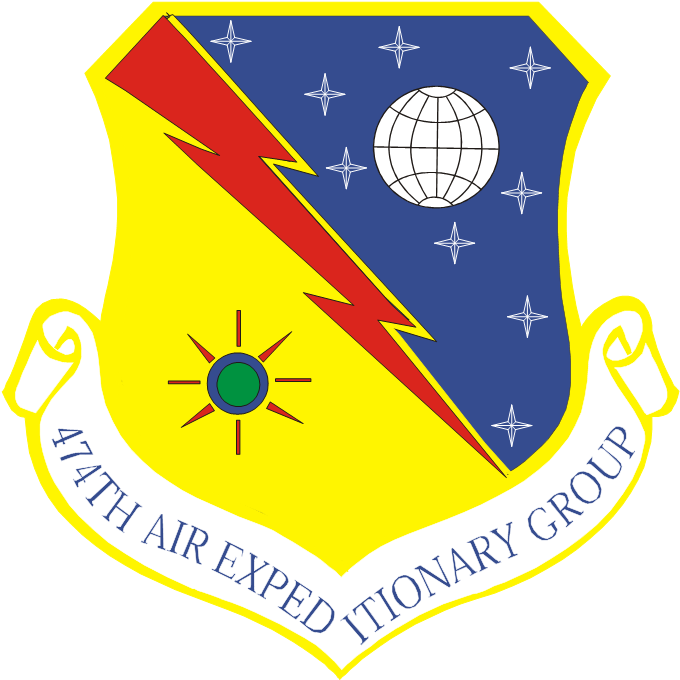
- 474th Air Expeditionary Group emblem (approved 22 June 1955)

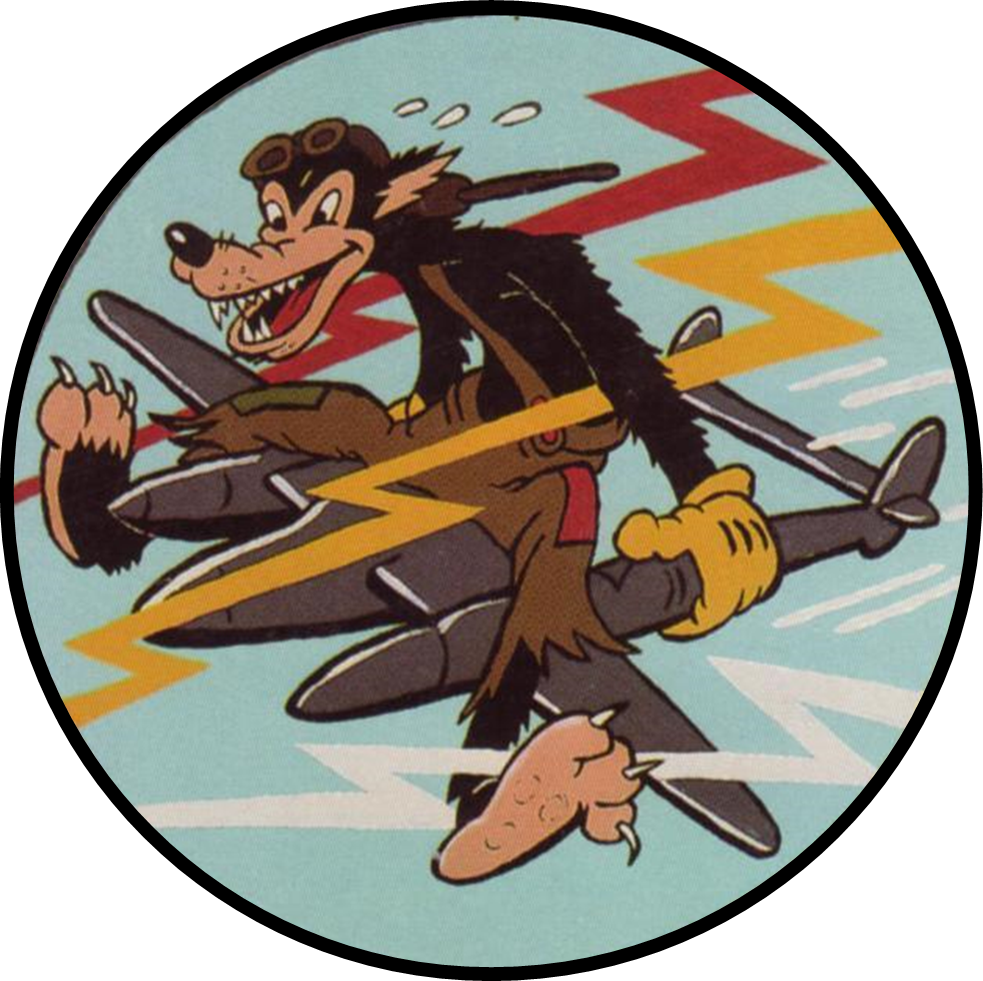
- 474th Fighter Group emblem (World War II) (Note: The 474th Fighter Group patch depicts a wolf riding a P-38, and variations of that theme were depicted on all of the assigned fighter squadron patches. "474th Fighter Group". American Air Museum in Britain.)

The 474th Air Expeditionary Group is a provisional United States Air Force unit assigned to Air Combat Command. It may be activated or inactivated at any time.

Its World War II predecessor unit, the 474th Fighter Group, was a Ninth Air Force combat unit of the Army Air Corps which fought in the European Theater. First deployed to England, it provided tactical air support in support of U.S. First Army until V-E Day.

== History ==
=== World War II ===
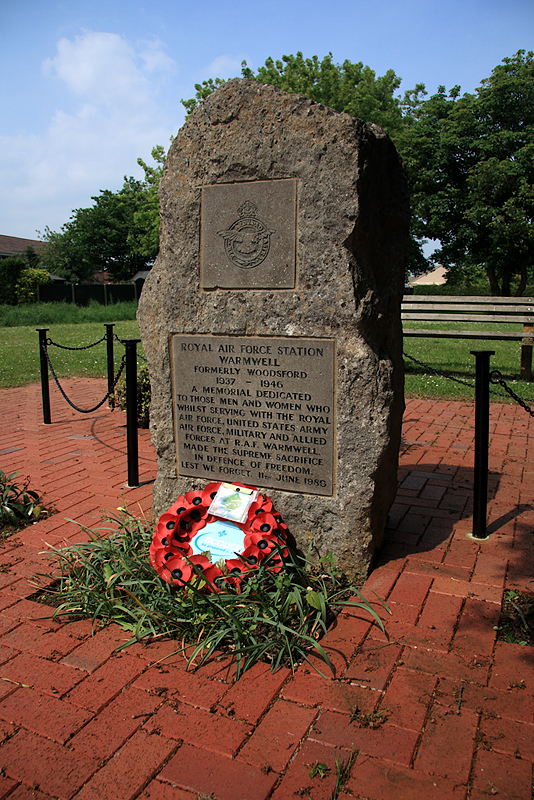
Memorial for RAF Warmwell

The 474th Fighter Group was constituted on 26 May 1943 and activated on 1 August 1943 at Glendale Airport, California, flying Lockheed P-38 Lightnings. Its component fighter squadrons were the 428th, 429th, and 430th Fighter Squadrons. For the next several months the group trained for combat with the P-38s. The Group moved to England in February–March 1944 where it became part of Ninth Air Force. The 474th was a group of Ninth Air Force's 70th Fighter Wing, IX Tactical Air Command. The 474th P-38s provided bomber escort but the primary mission was ground attack.

The grass airfield and sandy soil at RAF Warmwell was considered suitable to support the 80 aircraft of a fighter group without metal tracking support. The personnel of the 474th Fighter Group arrived on 12 March from Oxnard Flight Strip, California with their Lightnings. Probably because they detrained at Moreton railway station, the group often referred to RAF Warmwell as Moreton. The 474th was a group of Ninth Air Force's 70th Fighter Wing, IX Tactical Air Command. Squadron markings on the vertical tail surfaces were a square and "F5" for the 428th with call sign "Geyser", a triangle and "Y7" for the 429th with call sign "Retail", and a circle and "K6" for the 430th with call sign "Back Door". The 474th FG was the only one of the three Ninth Air Force groups equipped with the P-38 in England that had trained with the type in the United States.

The 474th carried out its first mission on 25 April with a sweep along the French coast. The P-38's ability to carry two 1,000 lb bombs with ease, and its heavy nose-mounted armament, made it an excellent ground attack aircraft, although it appeared to be far more vulnerable to light anti-aircraft and small arms fire than the redoubtable P-47. During 15 weeks of operations from Warmwell, 27 P-38s were missing in action, all but five known or suspected lost due to ground fire. Three of these were lost to a 'bounce' by Fw 190s while escorting B-26s on 7 May.

On the night of 5/6 June, the group flew patrols over the invasion fleet and the two aircraft lost are believed to have collided. On the credit side, during an armed reconnaissance on 18 July, a 474th formation led by Lieutenant Colonel Henry Darling surprised a force of bomb-carrying Focke-Wulf Fw 190s and shot down 10 Luftwaffe aircraft with the loss of only one P-38. The Group attacked bridges and railroads in France in preparation for the Normandy invasion, provided air cover for the invasion force, and flew bombing missions in support of the landings on 5–6 June.

German records state that, on 6 July, the 474th P-38s attacked a German strong-point and inflicted such damage that the Germans were unable to offer effective resistance when attacked. Subsequently, the Group's P-38s attacked roads and troops in support of the Allied breakthrough at St. Lo on 25 July.

The 474th was the last of the Ninth Air Force's 18 fighter groups to move to an Advanced Landing Ground in France, departing from Warmwell for Saint-Lambert Airfield during the first week of August 1944, the main body of aircraft departing on 6 August. The last mission from Warmwell, the group's 108th, was flown on the previous day.

The Group supported the British attack in Holland in September with the bombardment of flak positions near Eindhoven in advance of the British 1st Airborne Division and support to Allied forces in the Battle of the Bulge December 1944 - January 1945. The support included bomber escort missions and ground attacks on enemy transportation at Malmedy, St. Vith, and Schleiden. The Group also supported the airborne assault across the Rhine in March 1945. The award of the Distinguished Unit Citation was for a mission on 23 August 1944 in which, as part of a joint ground effort, they attacked retreating German forces in the Falaise-Argentan area. The targets of these attacks included an immense quantity of enemy equipment massed and trapped along the Seine River and, despite heavy anti-aircraft fire defending the bridges and covering the German retreat, the P-38s repeatedly bombed and strafed enemy motor transports, barges, bridges, and other objectives. This disrupted the German evacuation and enabled Allied ground forces to capture German troops and equipment. The Order of the Day, Belgian Army was awarded twice for actions 6 June - 30 September 1944 and 16 December 1944 – 25 January 1945.

The group continued operations on the continent providing tactical air support in support of First United States Army until V-E Day, being stationed at Langansalza Airfield at the end of hostilities. The 474th returned to Camp Kilmer, New Jersey during November 1945 and was inactivated on 8 December 1945.

==== World War II Commanders ====
- Colonel Clinton C. Wassem: 1 August 1943
- Lieutenant Colonel Earl C. Hedlund: 17 February 1945
- Lieutenant Colonel David L. Lewis: April 1945

==== World War II Campaigns ====
- Air Offensive, Europe
- Normandy
- Northern France
- Rhineland
- Ardennes-Alsace
- Central Europe

=== Korean War ===
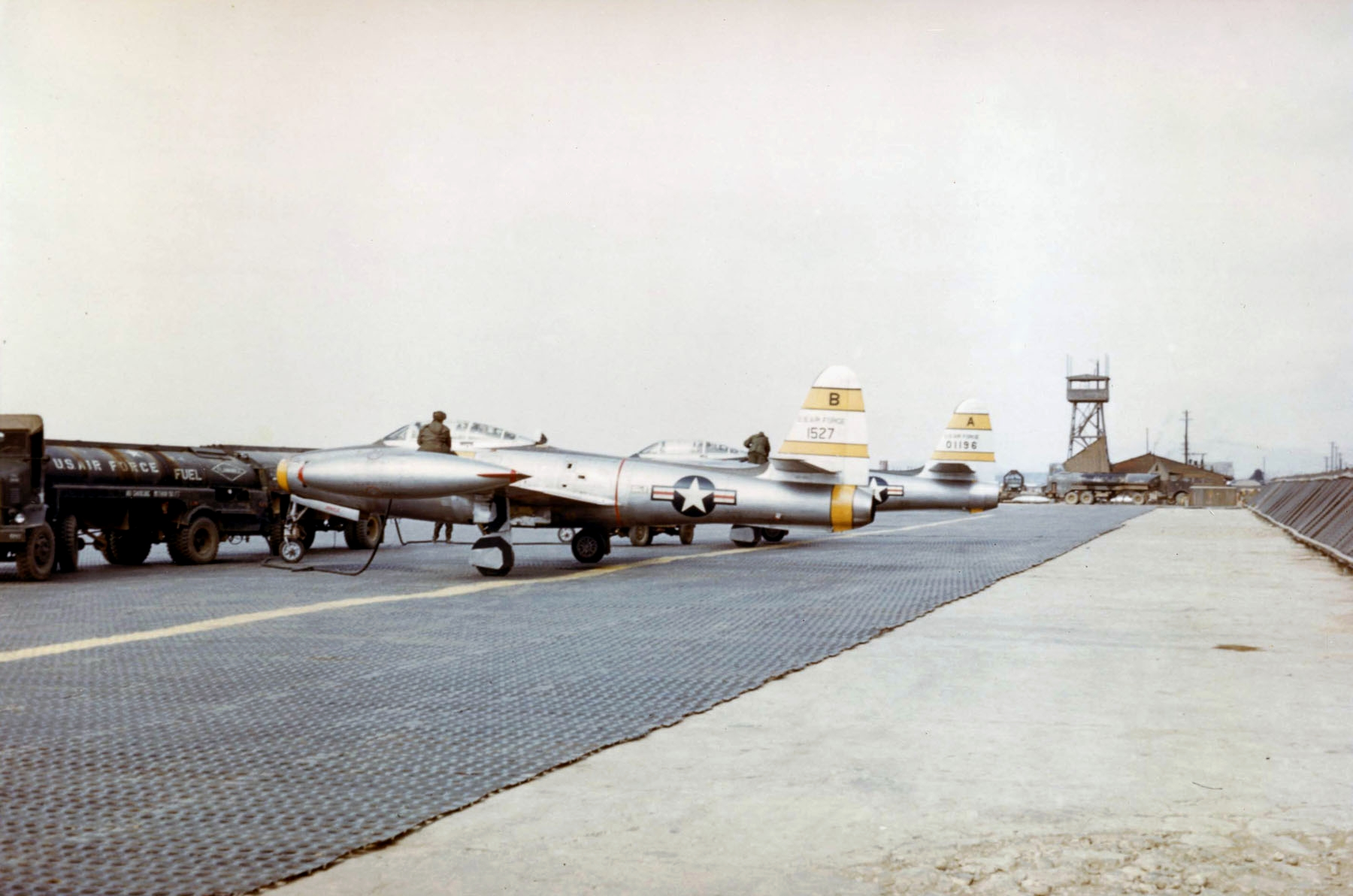
Group F-84Es being refueled during Korean War

The group was reactivated as the 474th Fighter-Bomber Group at Misawa Air Base, Japan, taking over the personnel and Republic F-84G Thunderjets of the Air National Guard 116th Fighter-Bomber Group on 10 July 1952 when the 116th was returned to state control. The 474th Fighter-Bomber Group which included the 428th Fighter-Bomber Squadron, 429th Fighter-Bomber Squadron, and 430th Fighter-Bomber Squadron as combat components, was itself established as a component of the 474th Fighter-Bomber Wing. On 10 July 1952, in what was one of the largest air deployments of its kind, the 474th Wing (including the Group) moved to Kunsan Air Base (K-8), Korea on the western side of the Korean peninsula. From Kunsan the Group entered combat in August 1952 and bombed and strafed bridges, bunkers, troop concentrations, artillery positions, and a host of other targets.

On 16 March 1953 Far East Air Forces put into effect a new concept of a fighter-bomber wing (reinforced) to ease maintenance and support problems. In April 1953, the 49th Fighter-Bomber Wing relocated to Kunsan – in name only—for two of its squadrons. The 428 Kunsan became the 7th FBS; and the 429th became the 8th FBS. Its 9th FBS was relocated to Misawa Air Base, Japan. The 430th of Kunsan was physically relocated with all personnel, equipment and aircraft to Taegu to replace the 9th. In the end, the 474th at Taegu had three squadrons, while the 49th at Kunsan had two squadrons. The 474th exchanged aircraft and personnel with the 49th Wing. In early summer 1953, these two wings were combined into the 58th Fighter-Bomber Wing (Reinforced) and the 474th and 49th Wings were placed on inactive status. The 58th Wing then relocated to Tageu.

On 27 August 1954 a formal review and retreat ceremony was held at the Taegu Air Base. Lt. Gen. Roger M. Ramey, Fifth Air Force Commander, presented the 474th Fighter-Bomber Group with the Distinguished Unit Citation, 1 Dec 1952 – 30 Apr 1953. It was also awarded the Republic of Korea Presidential Unit Citation, 10 Jul 1952 – 30 Mar 1953.

=== Cold War ===
The group moved to the US, November–December 1954, and became operational training unit for F-100 aircraft for the 312th Fighter-Bomber Wing at Clovis Air Force Base, New Mexico. It was inactivated in 1957 and replaced by the 474th Fighter-Bomber Wing.

=== Post Cold War ===
Activated as 474th Air Expeditionary Group by Air Combat Command.

== Lineage ==
- Constituted as the 474th Fighter Group on 26 May 1943

Activated on 1 August 1943
Inactivated on 8 December 1945

- Redesignated 474th Fighter-Bomber Group on 25 June 1952

Activated on 10 July 1952
Inactivated on 8 October 1957

- Redesignated: 474th Tactical Fighter Group on 31 July 1985
- Redesignated 474th Air Expeditionary Group and converted to provisional status by September 2004

=== Assignments ===
- Los Angeles Fighter Wing, 1 August 1943 – 6 February 1944
- IX Fighter Command, 12 March 1944
- 70th Fighter Wing, 1 August 1944 (attached to IX Tactical Air Command), 1 August 1944 – 21 November 1945
- Army Service Forces (for inactivation), 6–8 December 1945
- 474th Fighter-Bomber Wing, 25 June 1952 – 8 November 1954(attached to Fifth Air Force after 1 April 1953)
- Twelfth Air Force (attached to 312th Fighter-Bomber Wing), 8 November 1954 – 8 October 1957
- Air Combat Command to activate or inactivate as needed

Attached to Twelfth Air Force c. September 2004
12th Air and Space Expeditionary Task Force, August 2007 – unknown

=== Stations ===
- Glendale Airport, California, 1 August 1943
- Van Nuys Airport, California, 11 October 1943
- Oxnard Flight Strip, California, 5 January – 6 February 1944
- RAF Warmwell (AAF-454), England, 12 March 1944
- Saint-Lambert Airfield (A-11), France, 6 August 1944 (Note: There is a monument at Neuilly-la-Foret dedicated in 1994 to the 474th Fighter Group. The associated information sign states in English and in French, "Construction of the A-11 airfield was begun on the 22nd July 1944 by the 832nd Engineer Aviation Battalion. It was declared operational on 5 August 1944 and accommodated the 474th Fighter Group and the P-38 Lightnings (fighter bombers). About 100 planes parked on this aerodrome of around 200 hectares. Only three squadrons, with 25 fighter bombers in each one, were operational. The rest were used for liaison between the different aerodromes. On 23rd August, the 474th Fighter Group had its hour of glory, when it destroyed a significant quantity of equipment and materiel amassed along the Seine, behind the pocket of resistance of Falaise-Argentan. On 25 August, 23 pilots from the 474th Fighter Group took off from the aerodrome. 11 of them fell above the Oise after a huge combat with German fighters. On 5 September 1944, the land of the A-11 airfield was returned to French authorities." "474th Fighter Group". U.S. War Memorials.)
- Saint Marceau Airfield (A-43), France, 29 August 1944
- Peronne Airfield (A-72), France, 6 September 1944
- Florennes/Juzaine Airfield (A-78), Belgium, 1 October 1944
- Strassfeld Airfield (Y-59), Germany, 22 March 1945
- Langansalza Airfield (R-2), Germany, 22 April 1945
- AAF Station Schweinfurt (R-25), Germany, 16 June 1945
- AAF Station Stuttgart/Echterdingen (R-50), Germany, 25 October – 21 November 1945
- Camp Kilmer, New Jersey, 6–8 December 1945
- Misawa Air Base, Japan, 10 July 1952
- Kunsan Air Base (K-8), South Korea, 10 July 1952
- Taegu Air Base (K-2), South Korea, 1 April 1953 – 22 November 1954
- Clovis Air Force Base (later Cannon Air Force Base), New Mexico, 13 December 1954 – 8 October 1957

=== Components ===
- 428th Fighter Squadron (later 428th Fighter-Bomber Squadron), 1 August 1943 – 8 December 1945, 10 July 1952 – 8 October 1957 (attached to 58th Fighter-Bomber Wing 1 April 1953 – 24 November 1954)
- 429th Fighter Squadron (later 429th Fighter-Bomber Squadron), 1 August 1943 – 8 December 1945, 10 July 1952 – 8 October 1957 (attached to 58th Fighter-Bomber Wing 1 April 1953 – 22 November 1954)
- 430th Fighter Squadron (later 430th Fighter-Bomber Squadron), 1 August 1943 – 8 December 1945, 10 July 1952 – 8 October 1957 (attached to 58th Fighter-Bomber Wing 1 April 1953 – 22 November 1954)

== Aircraft ==
- Lockheed P-38 Lightning, 1943–1945
- Republic F-84 Thunderstreak, 1952–1954
- North American F-86 Sabre, 1955–1957
