= Bad Langensalza Airfield =

Airfield in Germany

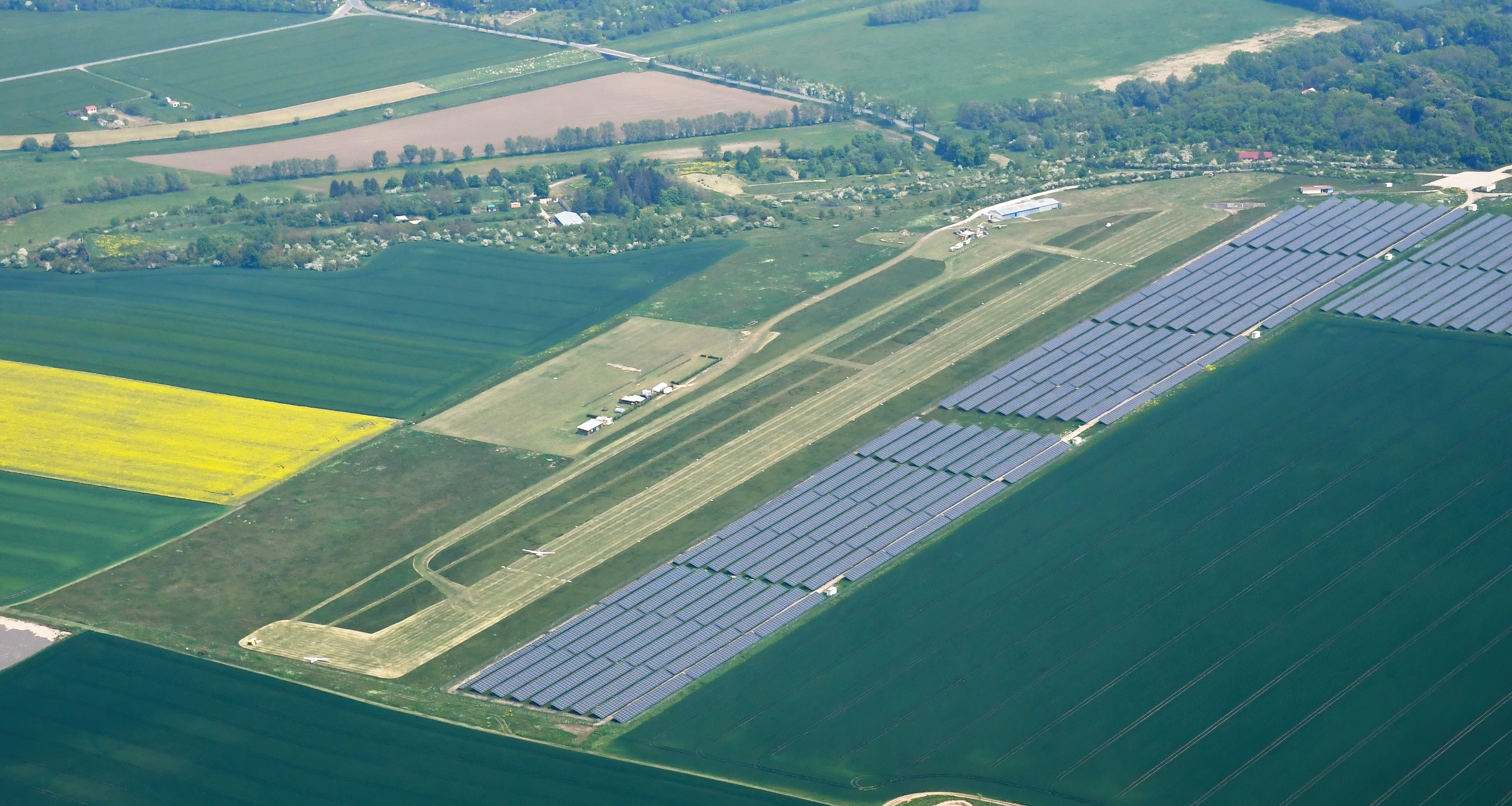
- IATA: none; ICAO: EDEB

Summary
- Airport type: Public
- Serves: Bad Langensalza, Germany
- Elevation AMSL: 980 ft / 299 m
- Coordinates: 51°07′46″N 010°37′18″E

Map

Runways
Direction	Length		Surface
Direction	m	ft	Surface
09/27	606	2,000	Grass

Bad Langensalza Airfield (ICAO: EDEB) is a general aviation facility located in Germany, about 4 kilometres (2 mi) north-northwest of Bad Langensalza (Thuringen); approximately 240 kilometres (149 mi) southwest of Berlin. It is classified as a Sonderlandeplatz meaning that it has no guaranteed hours of service, so that visitors need to obtain "prior permission".

The airfield has a short grass runway, which is used primarily for light aircraft and gliders. There is a small terminal and a hangar at the facility.

== History ==
The field was first operated by the Luftwaffe 1938. It was used by dive bombers and fighter bombers, first with Henschel Hs 123s, then at the beginning of 1939, with Junkers Ju 87B "Stukas", Dornier Do 17Z light bombers and Junkers Ju 88A fighter-bombers which were assigned to combat units, being used first in the Invasion of Poland in 1939, the aircraft were then moved west prior to the Battle of France in 1940.

As the war progressed, Langensalza became a reserve support base. In 1944 it was used as a night interceptor fighter airfield as part of the Defense of the Reich campaign, with NJG 2, operating Ju 88C/R night fighters against RAF night bomber attacks during March–April of that year.

American Army units moved into the area in early April 1945, seizing the airfield with little resistance. The IX Engineering Command 825th Engineering Aviation Battalion arrived on 8 April and declared Langensalza operational, designating the airfield as Advanced Landing Ground "R-2". C-47 Skytrain transports began flying into and out of Langensalza, carrying in supplies and equipment to support the combat units moving east, and evacuating casualties to rear areas on the return flights. Late in the war, on 22 and 24 April, Ninth Air Force combat units, with P-38 Lightnings of the 474th Fighter Group and P-61 Black Widows of the 422d Night Fighter Squadron moved in, conducting operations until the end of combat on 7 May. The 474th Fighter Group remained at the airfield until 16 June 1945 when it moved out, ending military use of the airfield.

Abandoned for many years after the war ended due to its close proximity to the former East German border, the civil airfield was re-established after German reunification in 1990 and today is a well-equipped general aviation airfield. Several small buildings provide a terminal and support services. The former Luftwaffe station remains to the northeast of the airfield, with some buildings in use for light industrial purposes.

== See also ==
- Advanced Landing Ground
