= Saint-Lambert Airfield =

Saint-Lambert Airfield Advanced Landing Ground (ALG) A-11
- Calvados, Basse-Normandie Region, France
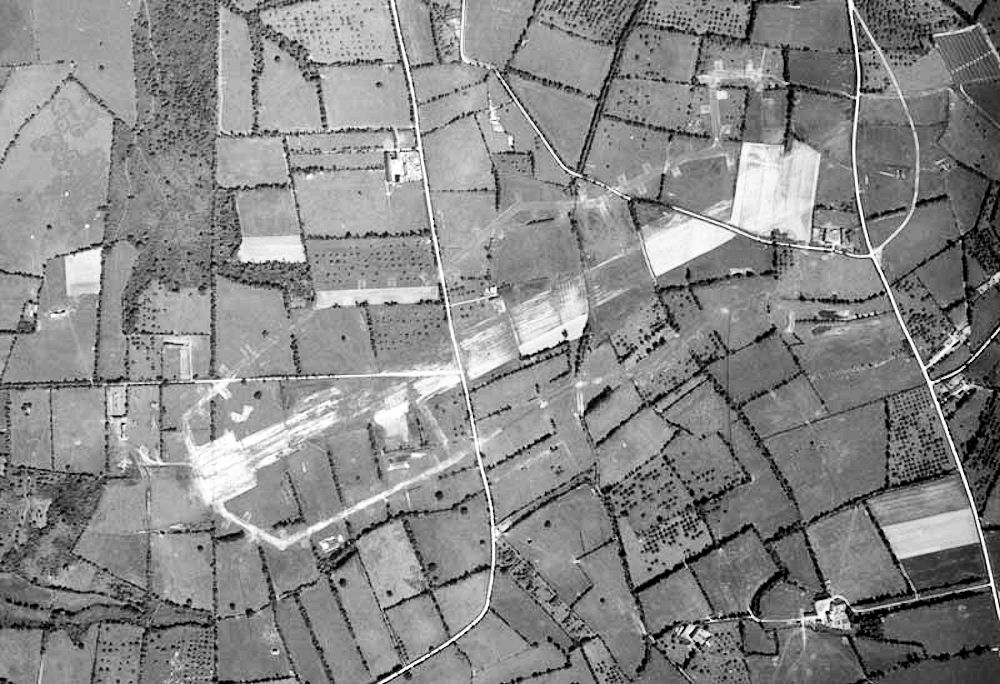
- Saint Lambert Airfield (A-11) after dismantling by the IX Engineering Command

Site information
- Type: Military Airfield
- Controlled by: United States Army Air Forces

Location
- Coordinates: 49°17′01″N 001°05′54″W

Site history
- Built by: IX Engineering Command
- In use: August–September 1944
- Materials: Prefabricated Hessian Surfacing (PHS)
- Battles/wars: World War II - EAME Theater: Northern France Campaign

Garrison information
- Garrison: Ninth Air Force
- Occupants: 474th Fighter Group

Airfield information
Runways
Direction	Length and surface
06/24	5,000 feet (1,520 m) SMT/PSP
- One runway, 4 alert pads, 50 hardstands

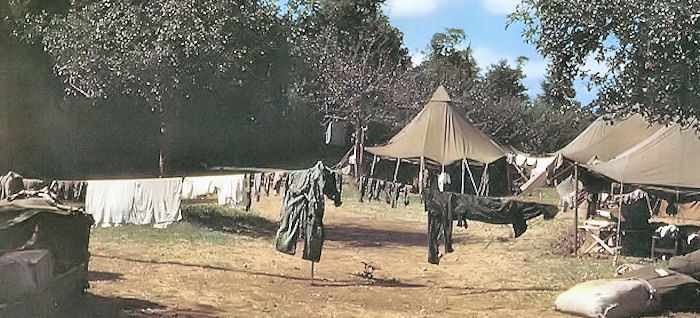
Living Facilities at Saint-Lambert Airfield (A-11), France, Summer 1944

Saint-Lambert Airfield is an abandoned World War II military airfield, which is located near the commune of Saint-Lambert in the Normandy region of northern France.

Located just outside Saint-Lambert, the United States Army Air Force established a temporary airfield shortly after D-Day on 22 July 1944, shortly after the Allied landings in France The airfield was one of the first established in the liberated area of Normandy, being constructed by the IX Engineering Command, 832d Engineer Aviation Battalion.

== History ==
Known as Advanced Landing Ground "A-11", the airfield consisted of a single 5000' (1500 m) Square-Mesh Track/Compressed Earth runway aligned 05/23.

In addition, with tents were used for billeting and also for support facilities; an access road was built to the existing road infrastructure; a dump for supplies, ammunition, and gasoline drums, along with a drinkable water and minimal electrical grid for communications and station lighting.

The fighter planes from Saint-Lambert flew support missions during the Allied invasion of Normandy, patrolling roads in front of the beachhead; strafing German military vehicles and dropping bombs on gun emplacements, anti-aircraft artillery and concentrations of German troops in Normandy and Brittany when spotted. Life at the airfield had its problems, mainly caused by dust during summer. The dust was everywhere, in tents, clothes, equipment and laundry.

After the Americans and British moved east into Central France with the advancing Allied Armies, the airfield was left un-garrisoned and used for resupply and casualty evacuation. It was closed on 11 September 1944 and the land returned to agricultural use.

== Major units assigned ==
- 474th Fighter Group 6–29 August 1944

428th (F5), 429th (7Y), 430th (K6) Fighter Squadrons (P-38)

== Current use ==
Today there is little or no physical evidence of the airfield's existence. A memorial to the men and units that were stationed at Saint Lambert Airfield can be found along the D 197 towards Isigny-sur-Mer.

== See also ==
- Advanced Landing Ground
