= Strassfeld Airfield =

Strassfeld Airfield Advanced Landing Ground (ALG) Y-59
- North Rhine-Westphalia, Germany

Site information
- Type: Military airfield
- Controlled by: German Government

Location
- Strassfeld Airfield (Germany)
- Coordinates: 50°41′43″N 006°53′21″E

Site history
- Built: 1930s
- In use: 1930s-1945 Mar-May 1945 (USAAF)
- Materials: Concrete

Strassfeld Airfield is an abandoned World War II military airfield located in Germany, about 5 miles east-northeast of Euskirchen in Nordrhein-Westfalen; approximately 310 miles southwest of Berlin.

== History ==
Strassfield was built prior to World War II as a grass airfield, most likely as a small airport serving the Euskirchen area.

The Luftwaffe did not use the airfield until March, 1940 when Aufklärungsgruppe 31 (AKG 31), a light reconnaissance unit flying Focke-Wulf Fw 189As, a light, twin engine reconnaissance plane was assigned to the airfield. The FW 189s were used to patrol the Franco-German border area prior to the invasion of the west on 10 May 1940. Shortly afterward, the unit was moved into Belgium, and later France to support the advancing German forces. The only other known use by the Luftwaffe of the airfield was in 1943, when 3 Fallschirm-Jäger-Division (Parachute Infantry Division) was assigned to the field. During the early 1940s, the airfield was improved, with Luftwaffe engineers laying down a 5000' concrete runway aligned 07/25.

American Army units moved into the Euskirchen area in early March 1945 as part of the Western Allied invasion of Germany and the airfield was attacked by Ninth Air Force Martin B-26 Marauder medium bombers and Republic P-47 Thunderbolt fighter-bombers to deny the retreating German forces use of the facility. The airfield was taken about 5 March. Combat engineers from IX Engineer command moved in with the 820th Engineering Aviation Battalion arriving on 10 March 1945, to repair the field for use by combat aircraft. Ongoing combat in the area and materiel shortages extended the repair time to about two weeks. The engineers laid down a 5000' Pierced Steel Planking all-weather runway over the bomb-cratered concrete runway, and performed minimal repairs to the facility to make it operational. On 29 March, the airfield was declared ready for Allied use and was designated as Advanced Landing Ground "Y-59 Strassfeld".

Once repaired, Ninth Air Force fighter units moved in, the first being the 474th Fighter Group, flying Lockheed P-38 Lightnings from the field from late March until the end of the war, attacking German army units, bridges and other ground targets of opportunity throughout Germany. In addition to the Lightnings, Northrop P-61 Black Widow night air defense interceptors were assigned to the field (414th, 422d Night Fighter Squadrons) briefly in April

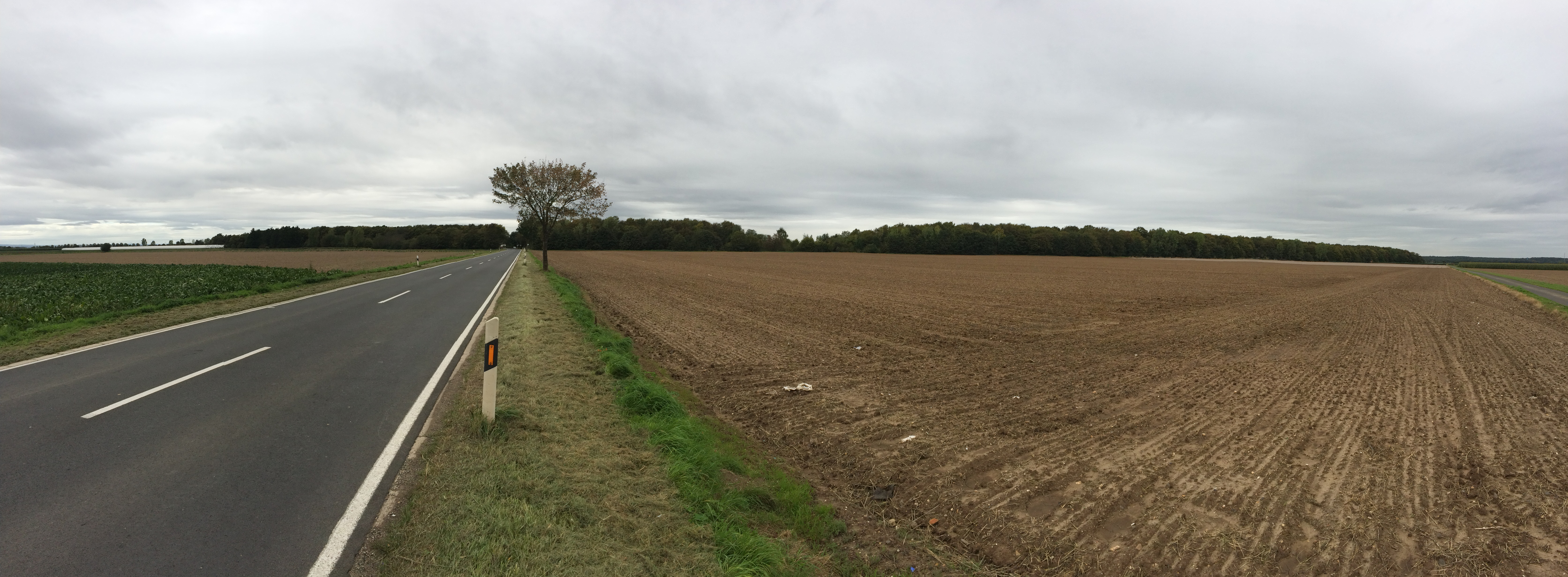
The Picture was taken from the south side (K61), viewing to north. (09/2014)

With the end of the war, Strassfeld Airfield was closed on 10 July 1945.

After the Americans closed the airfield the facility was never reopened. Eventually all of the facilities were removed and the land turned over for agricultural use.

The only relic of the airfield today is the 5000' runway, largely intact, overgrown with a thick cover of vegetation. Just northwest of the runway is a postwar antenna farm used by the Bundespolizei (BPOL), former Bundesgrenzschutz (BGS), as a HF bearing signal, built on what probably was the site of the airfield's ground station. The antenna farm is fenced to restrict entry, with a concrete access road from the K 61 highway, which bisects the former airfield.

== See also ==
- Advanced Landing Ground
