= List of Donald Trump 2024 presidential campaign former officials endorsements =

List of notable former officeholders who endorsed Donald Trump in the 2024 United States presidential election.

== Former Trump administration officials ==
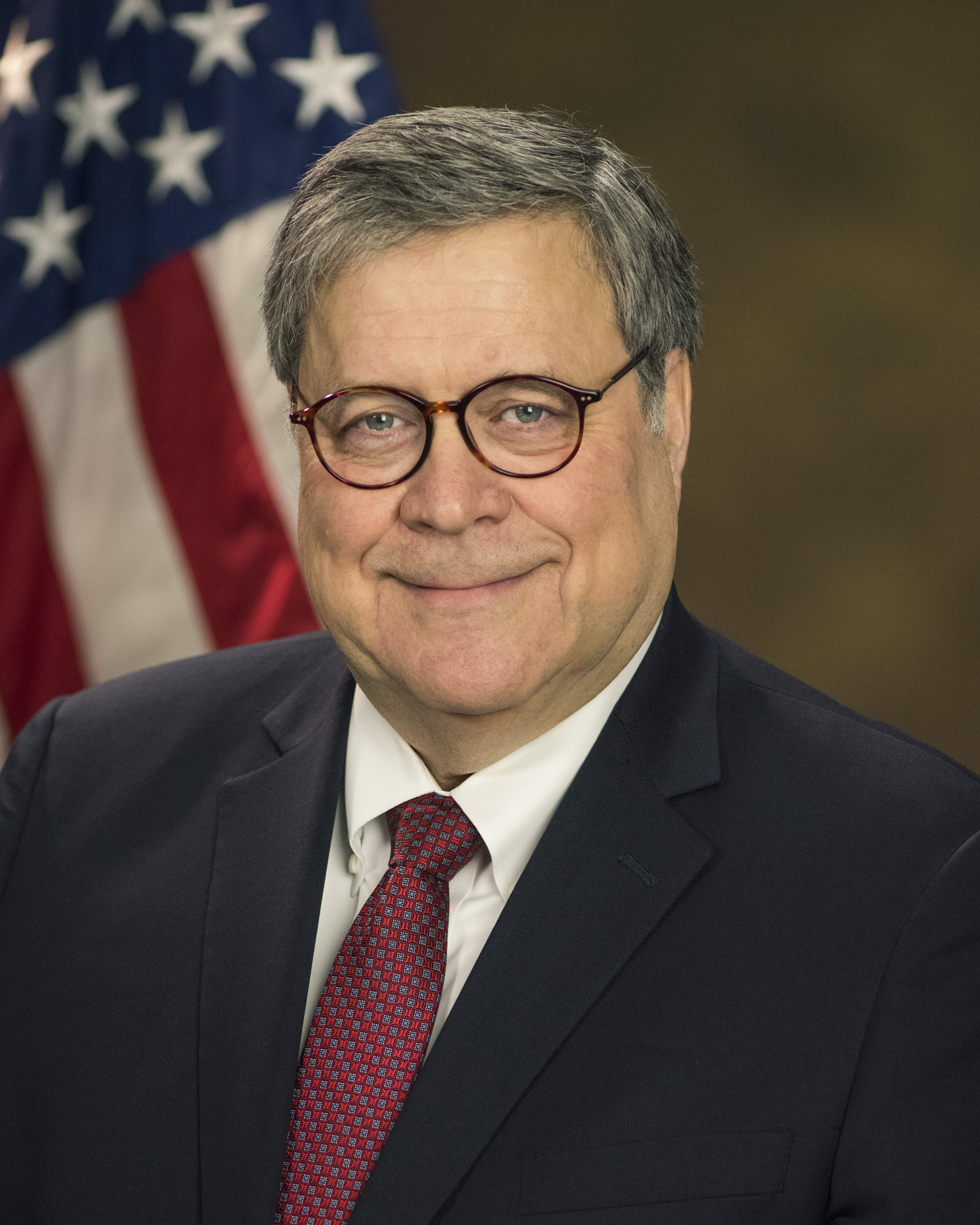
William Barr

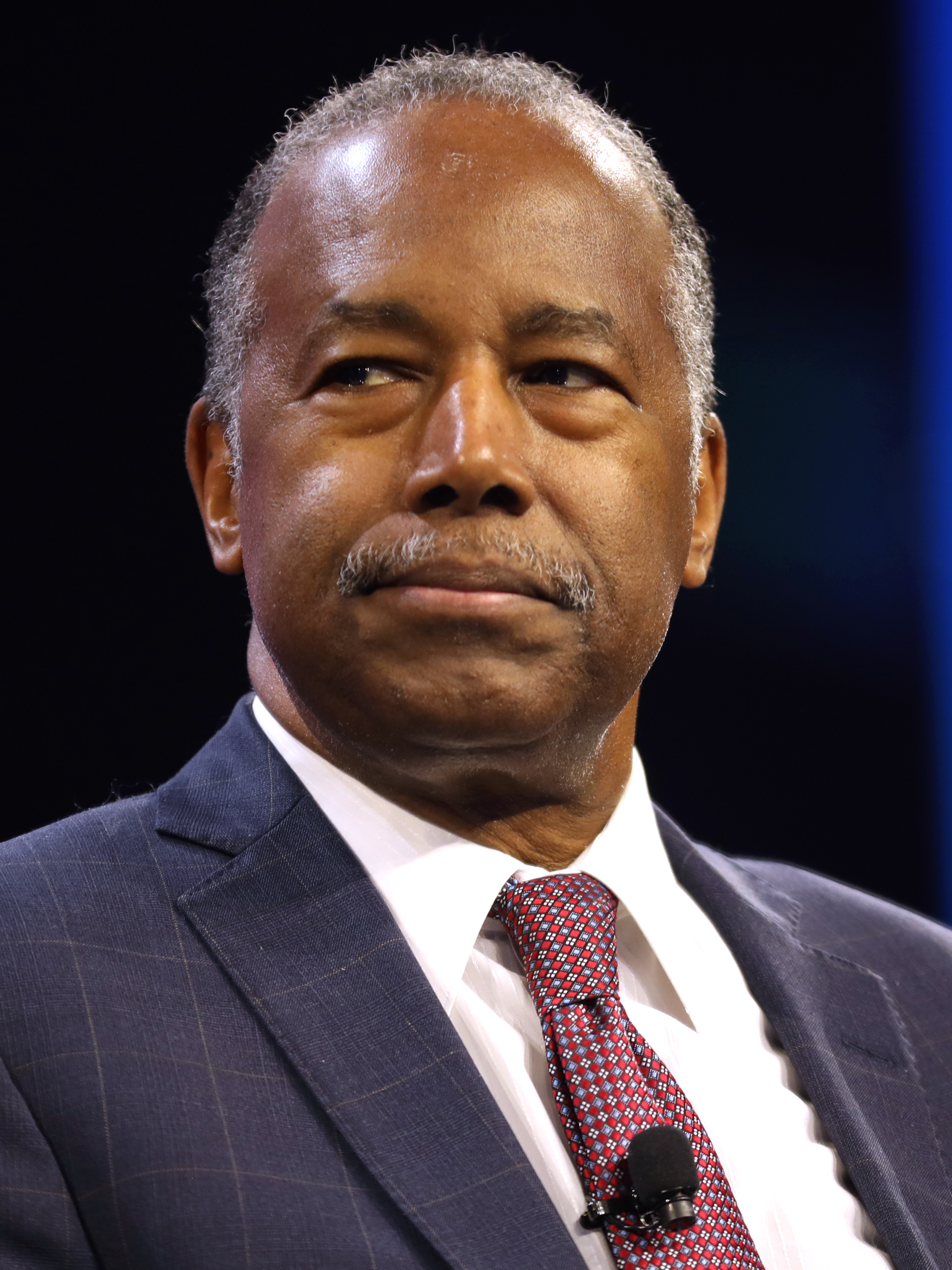
Ben Carson

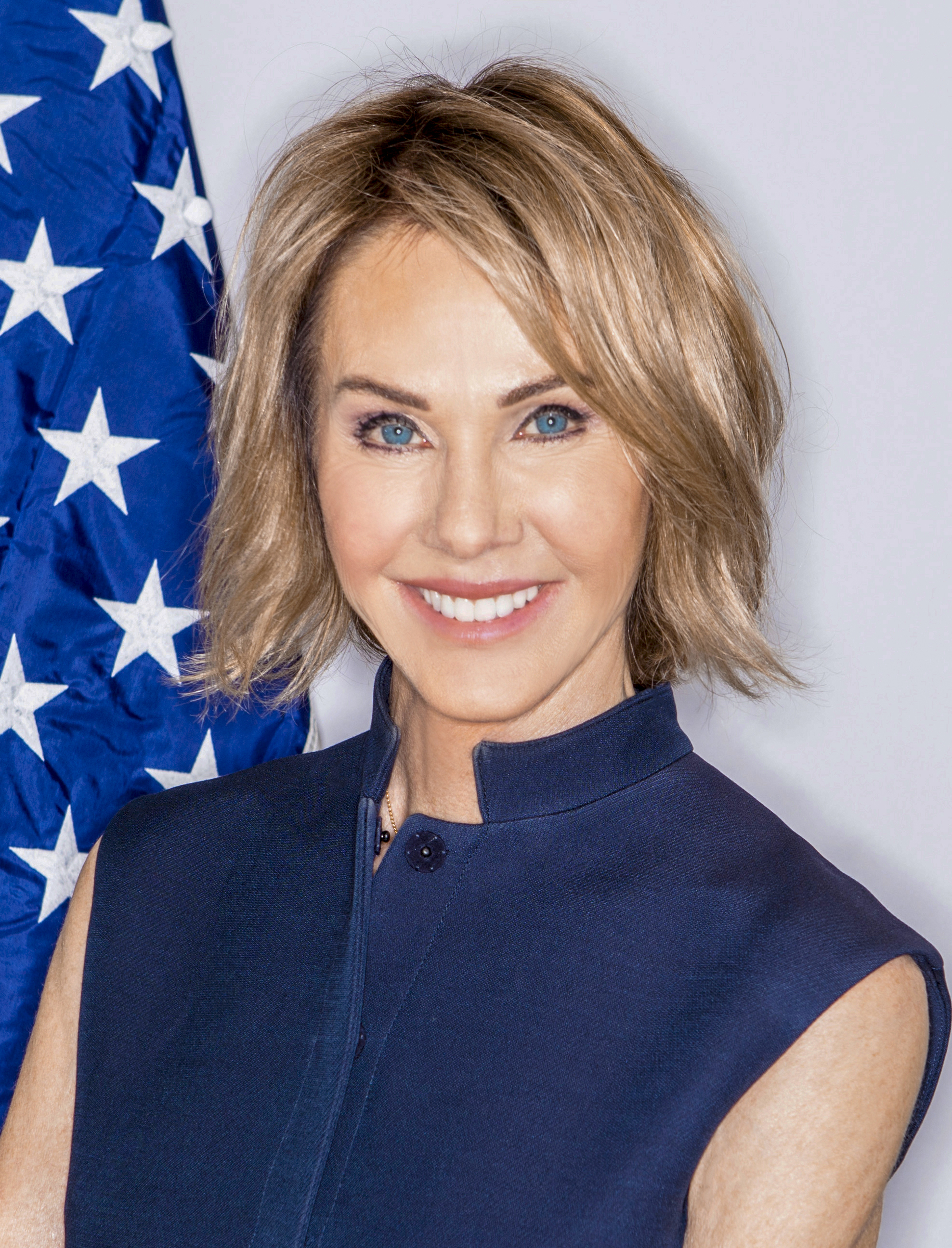
Kelly Craft

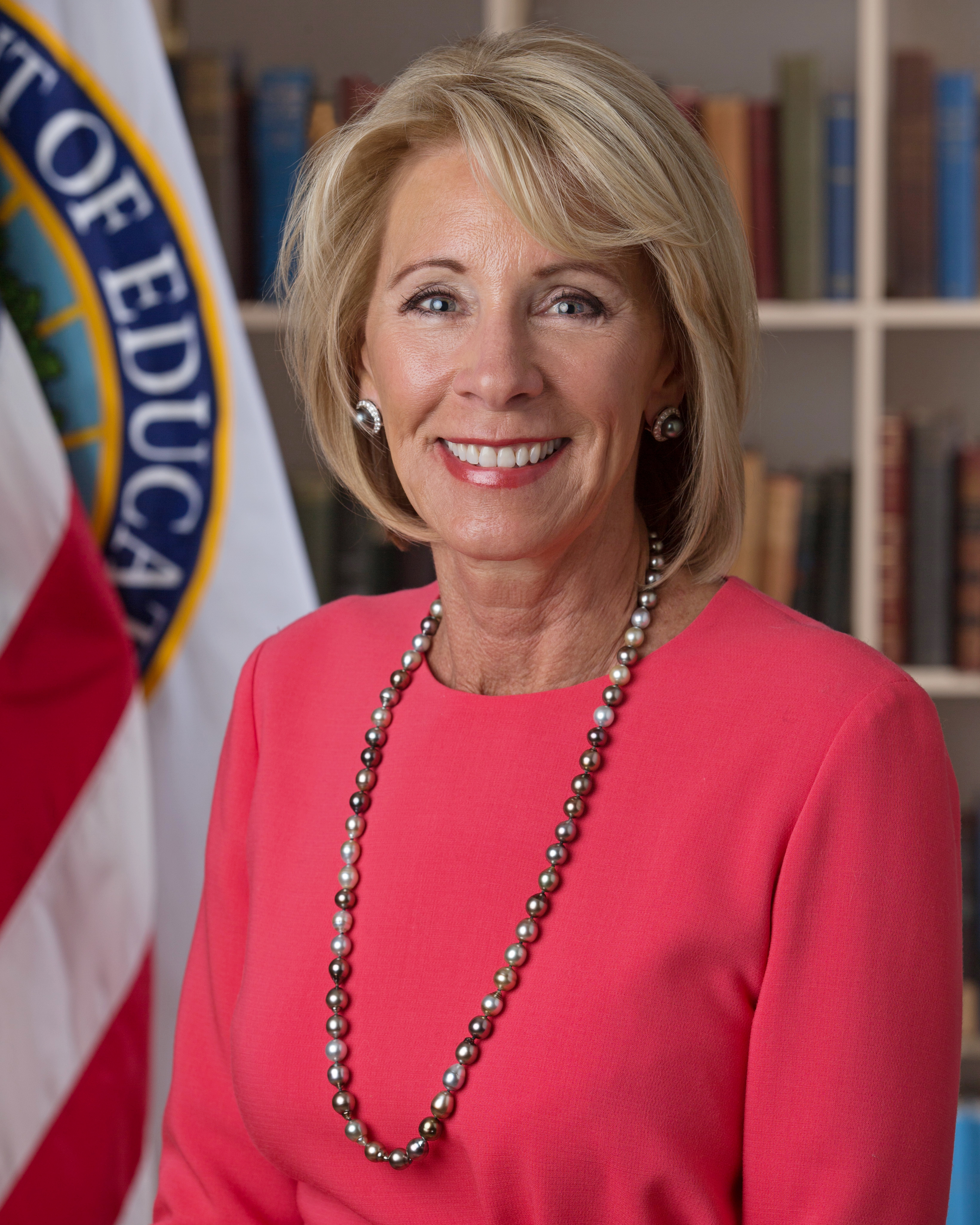
Betsy DeVos

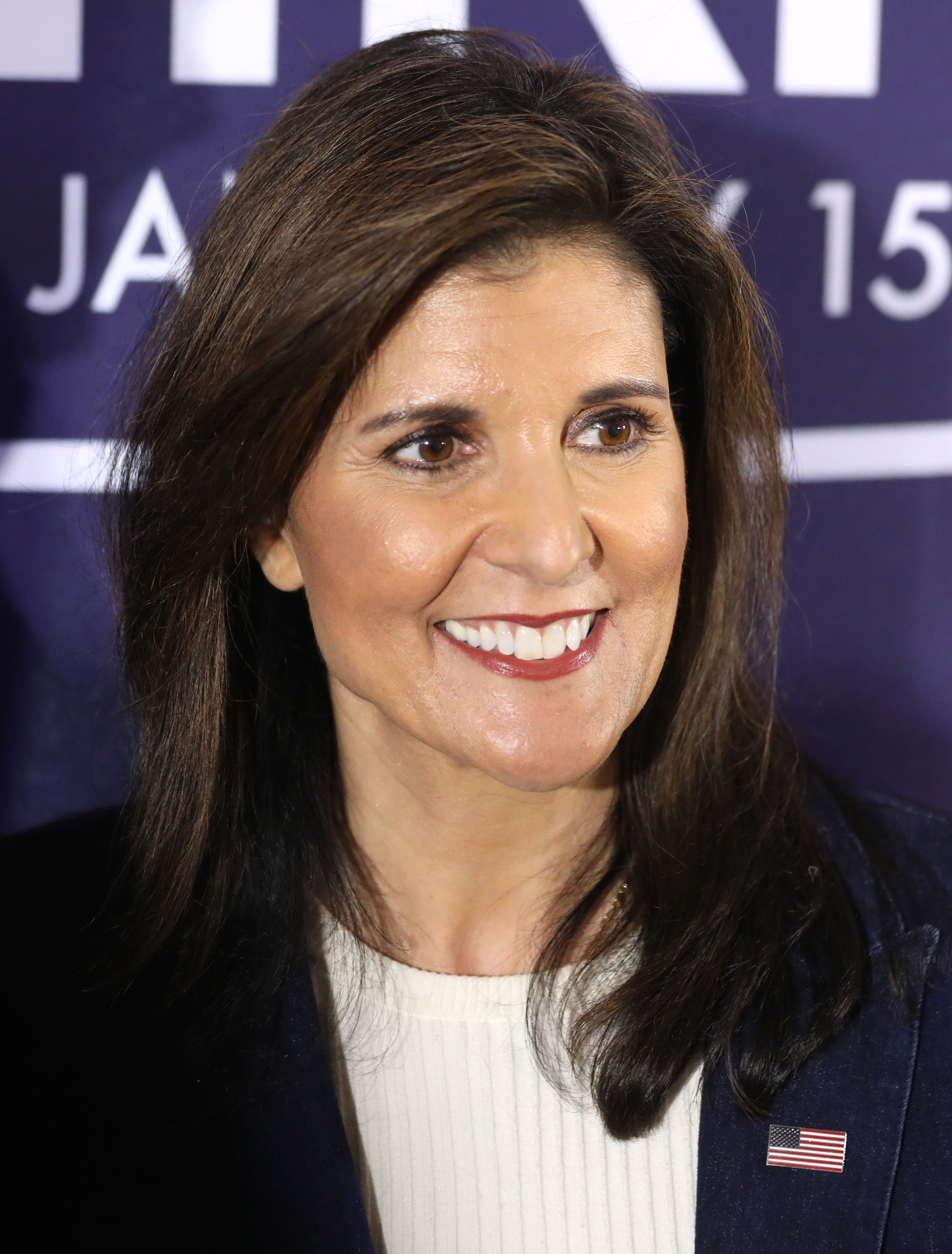
Nikki Haley

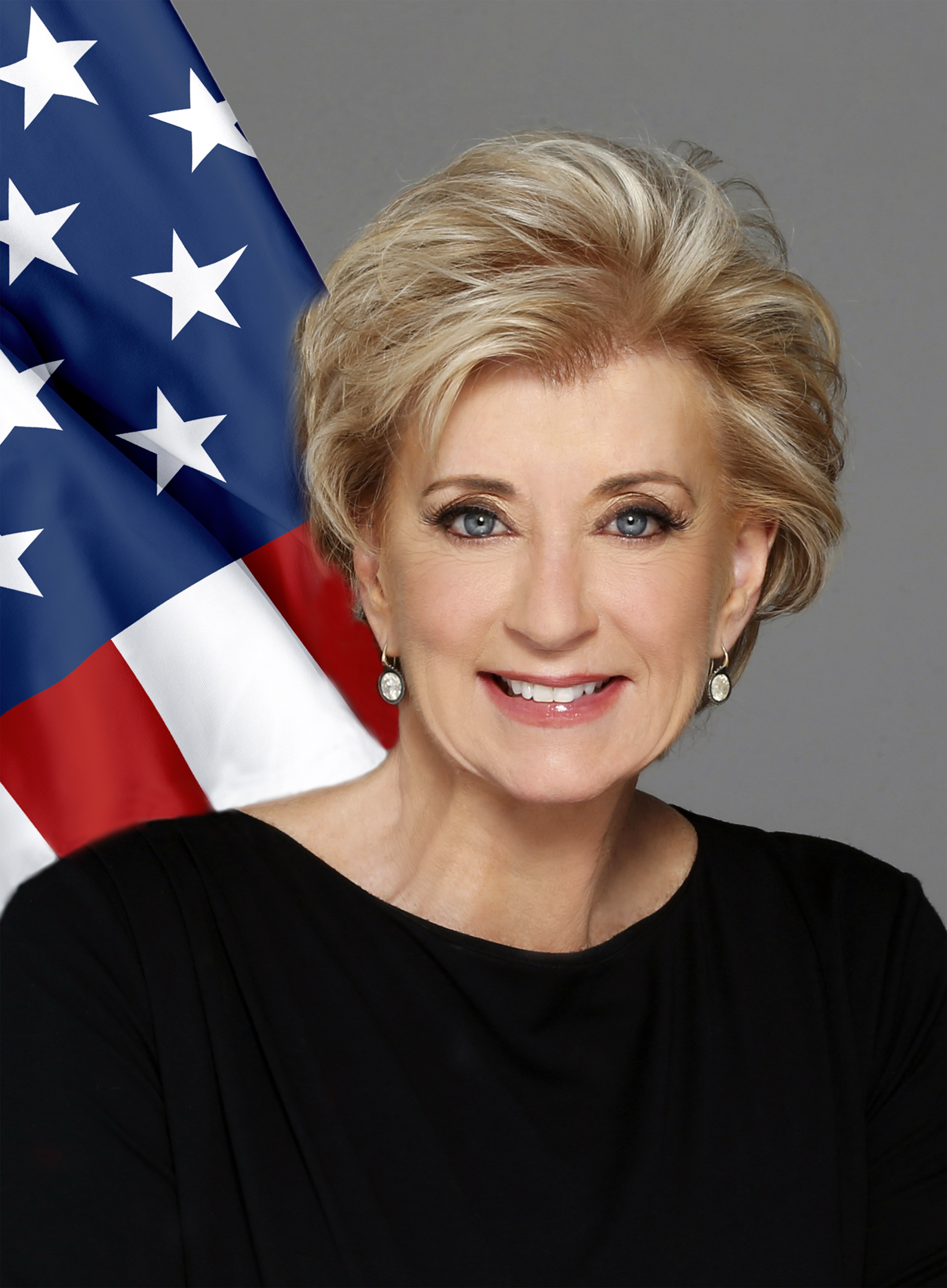
Linda McMahon

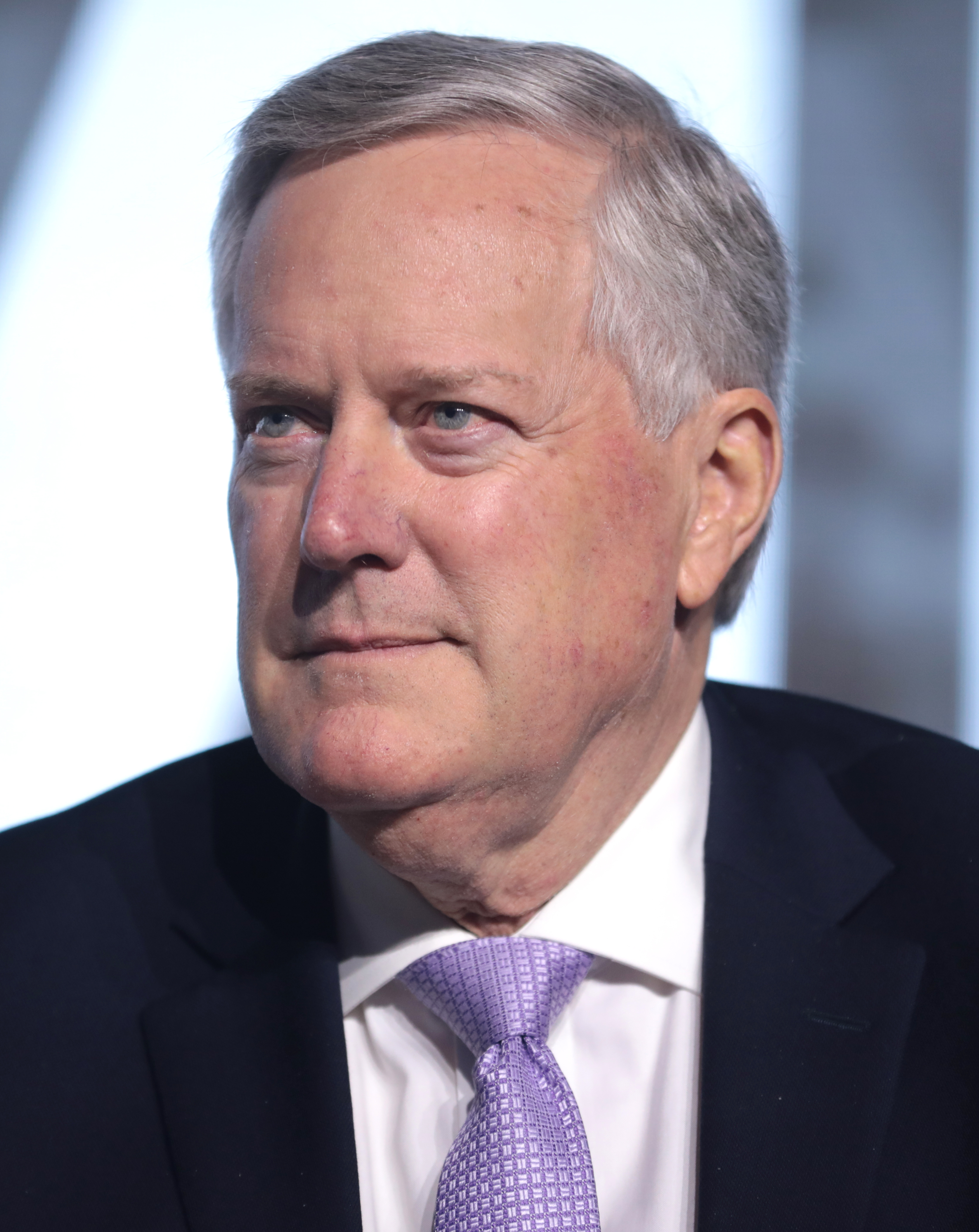
Mark Meadows

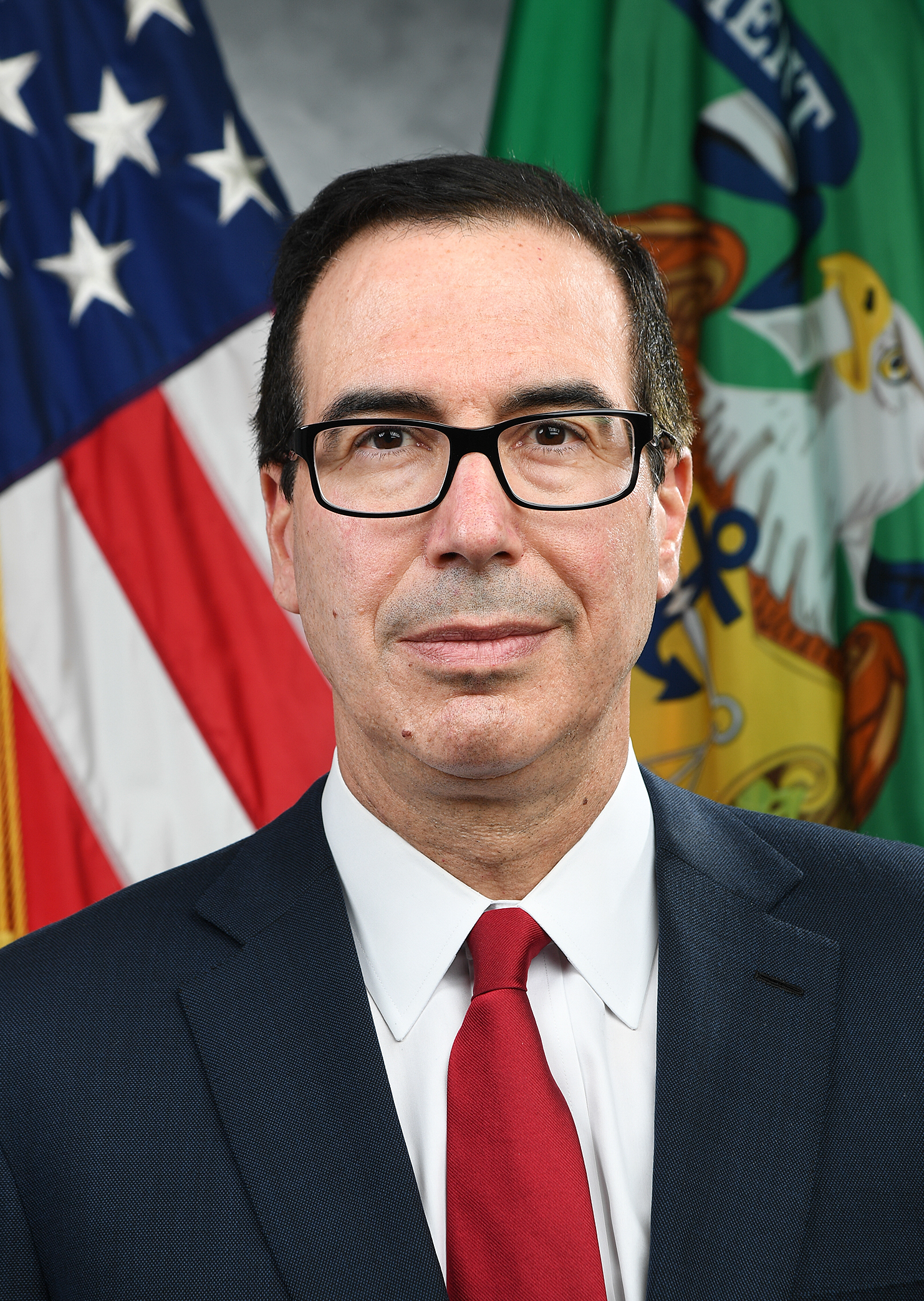
Steven Mnuchin

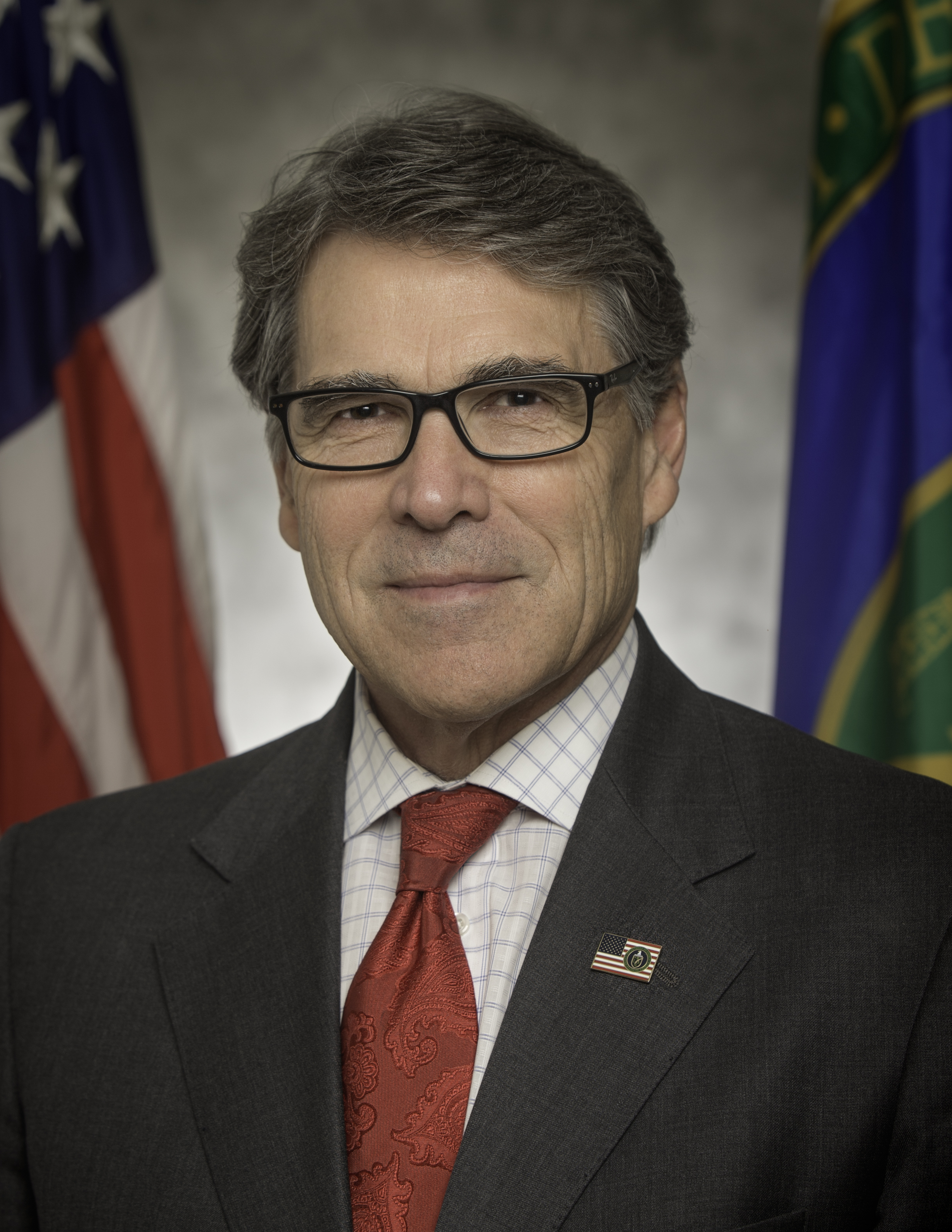
Rick Perry

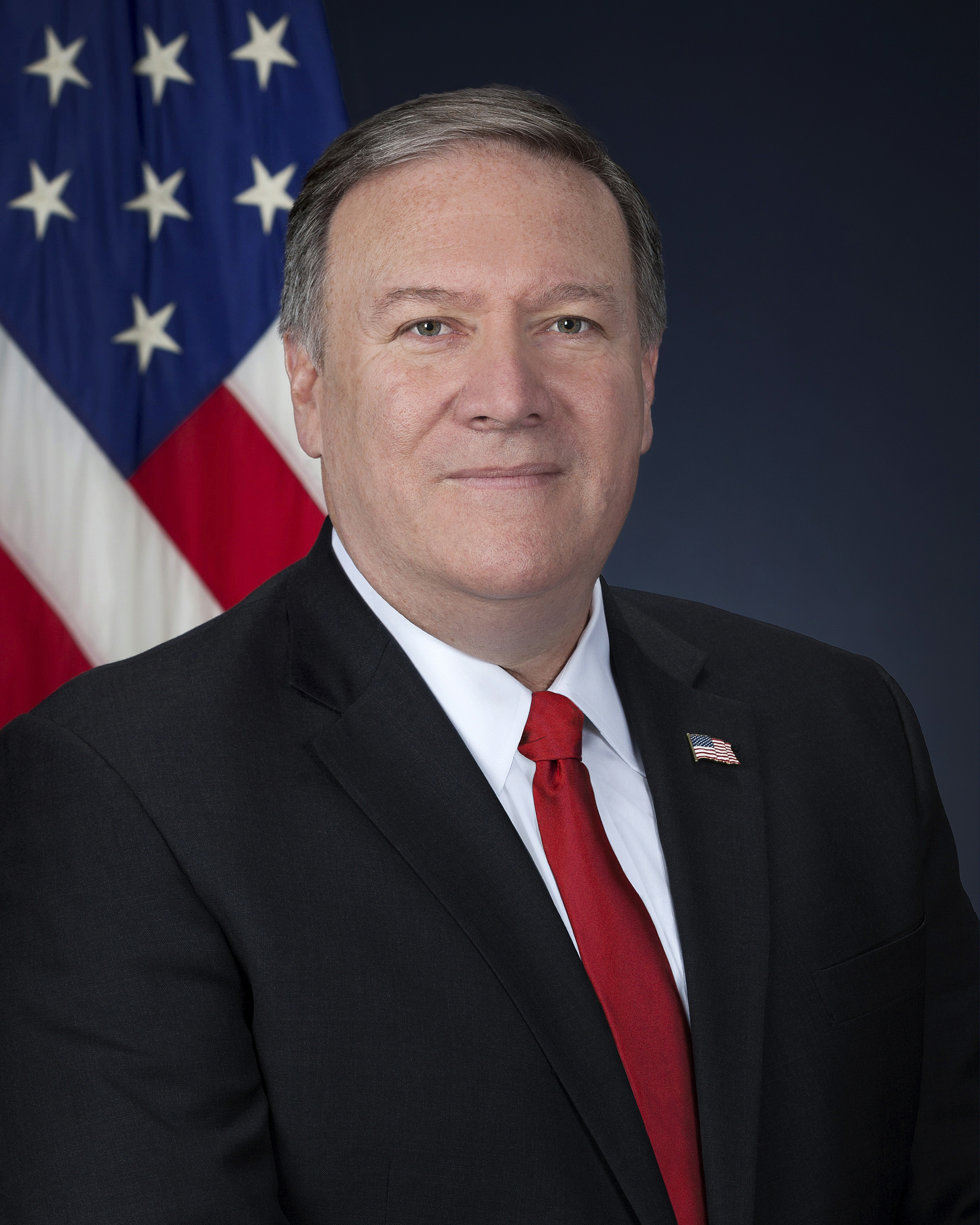
Mike Pompeo

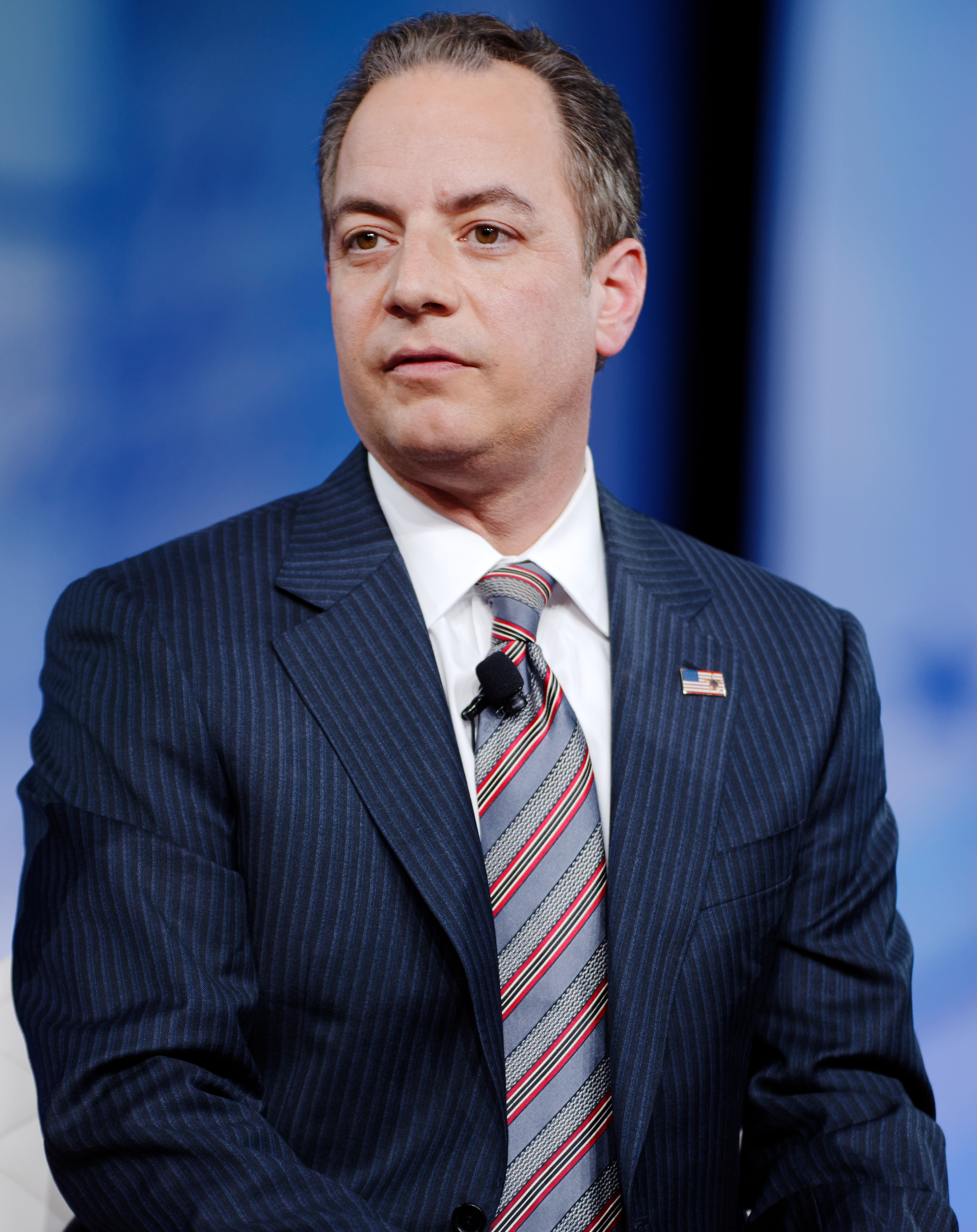
Reince Priebus

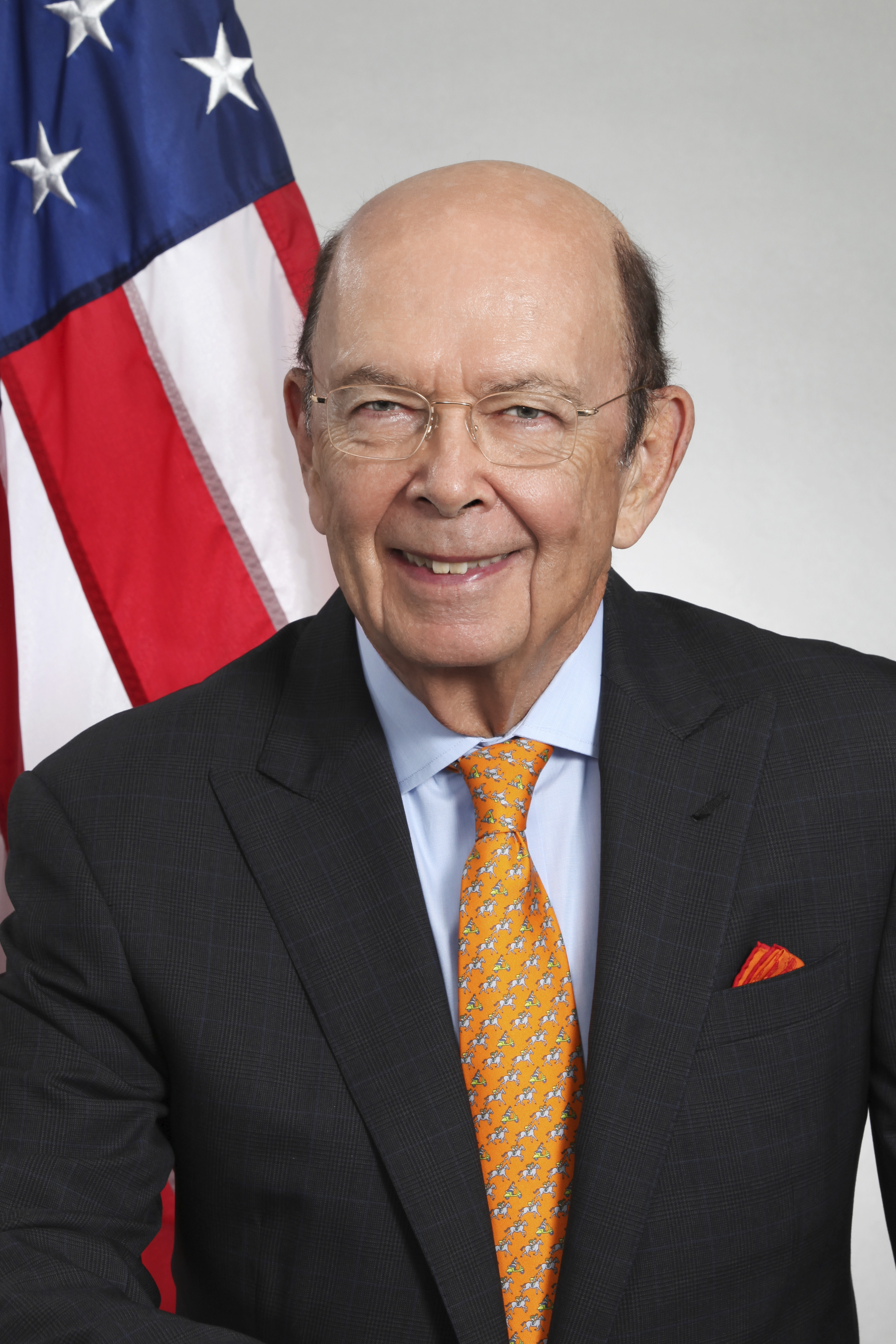
Wilbur Ross

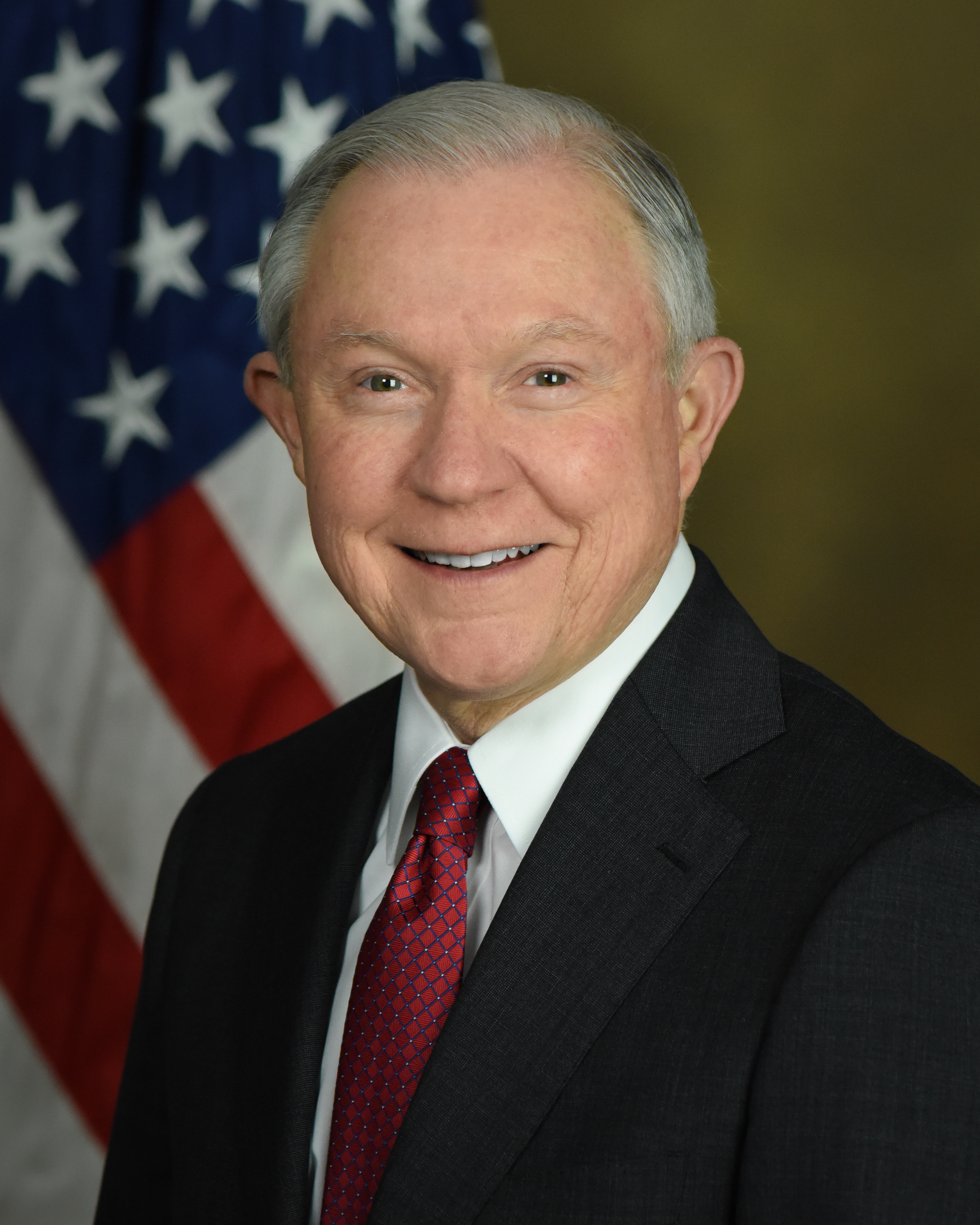
Jeff Sessions

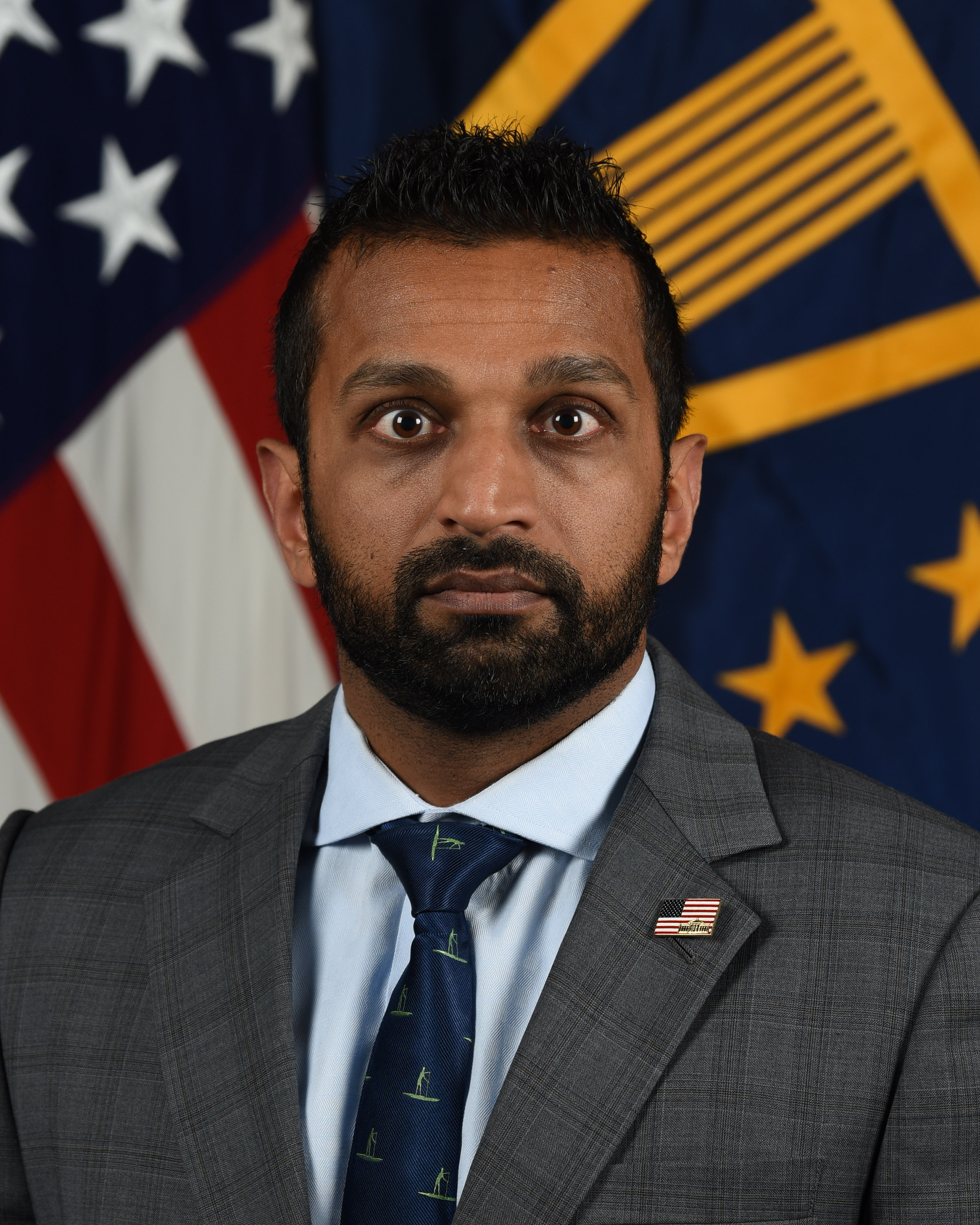
Kash Patel

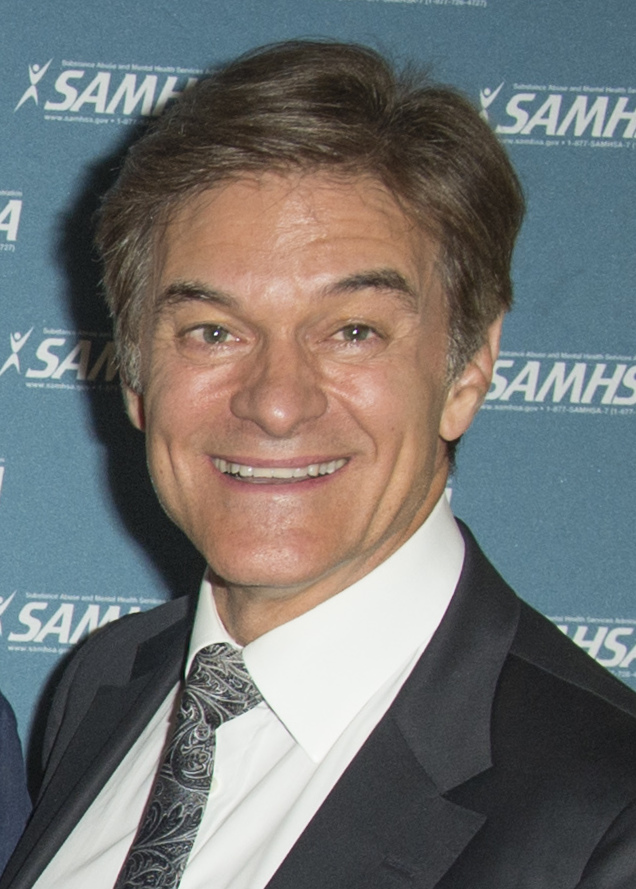
Mehmet Oz

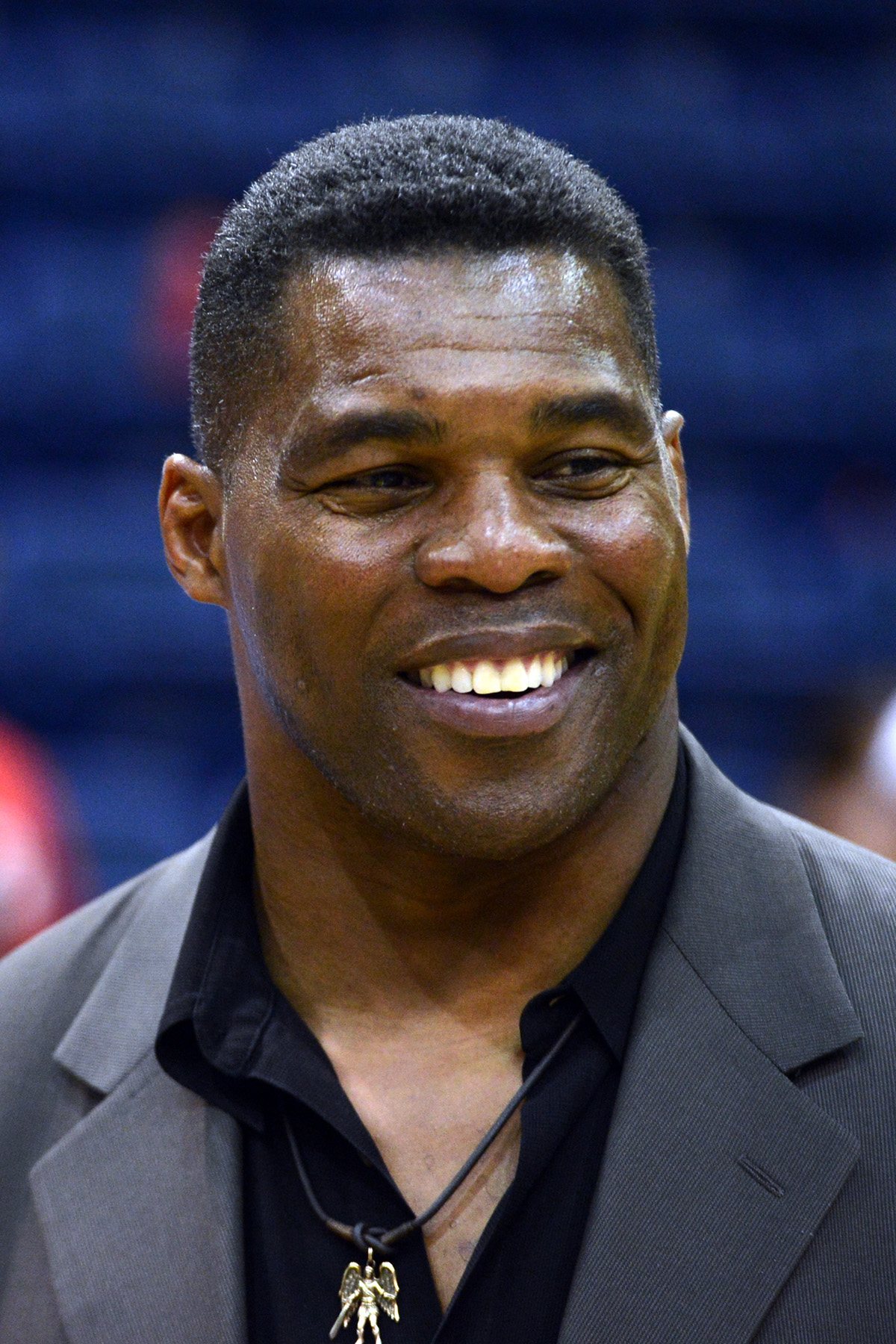
Herschel Walker

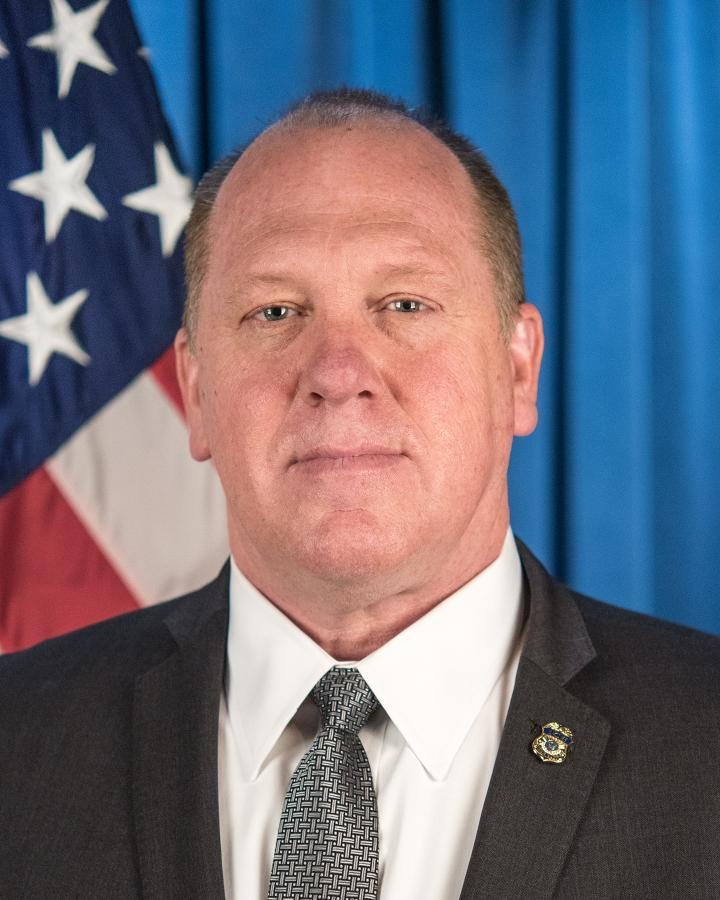
Tom Homan

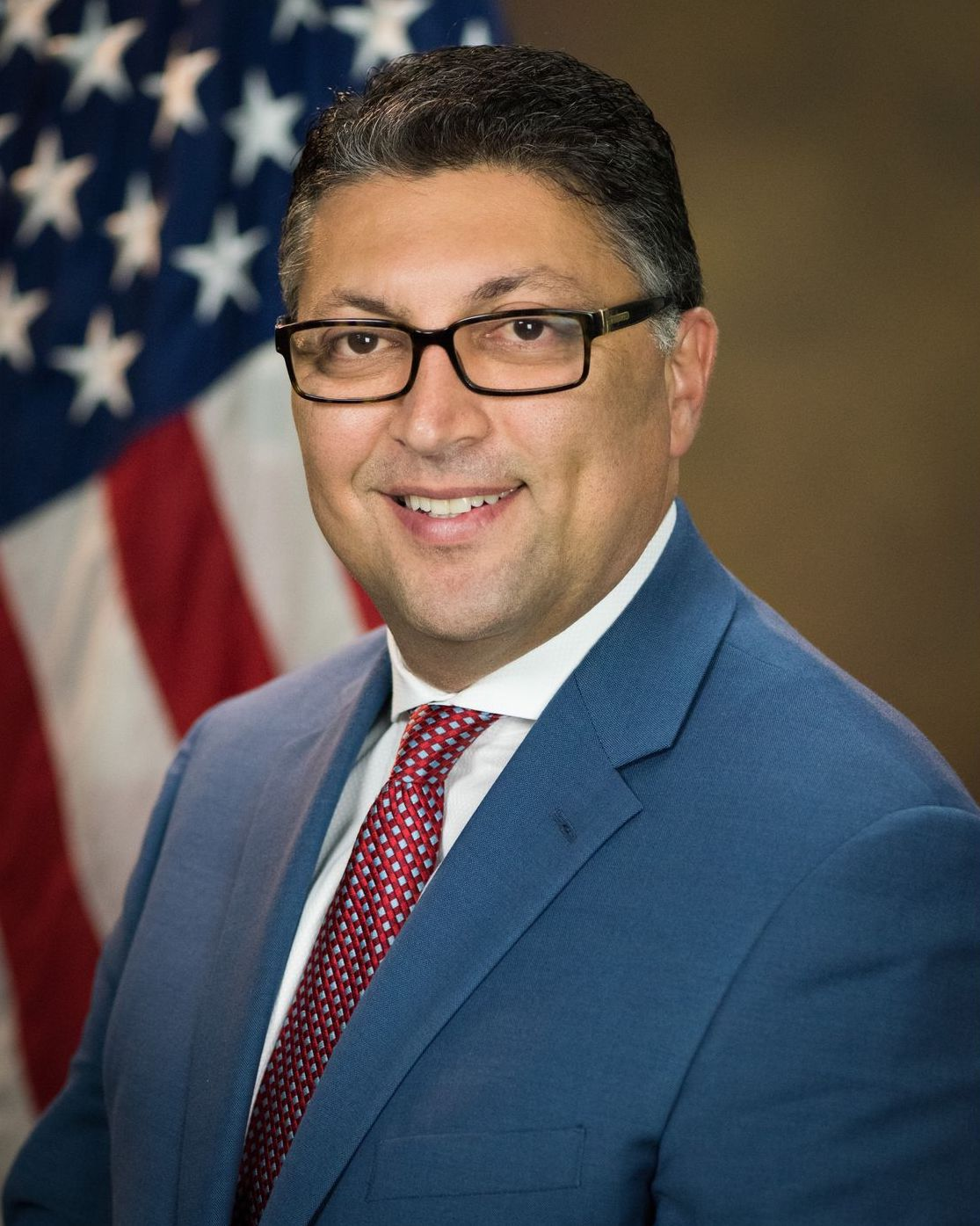
Makan Delrahim

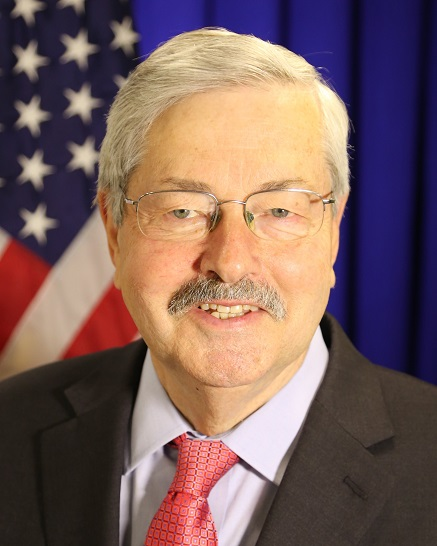
Terry Branstad

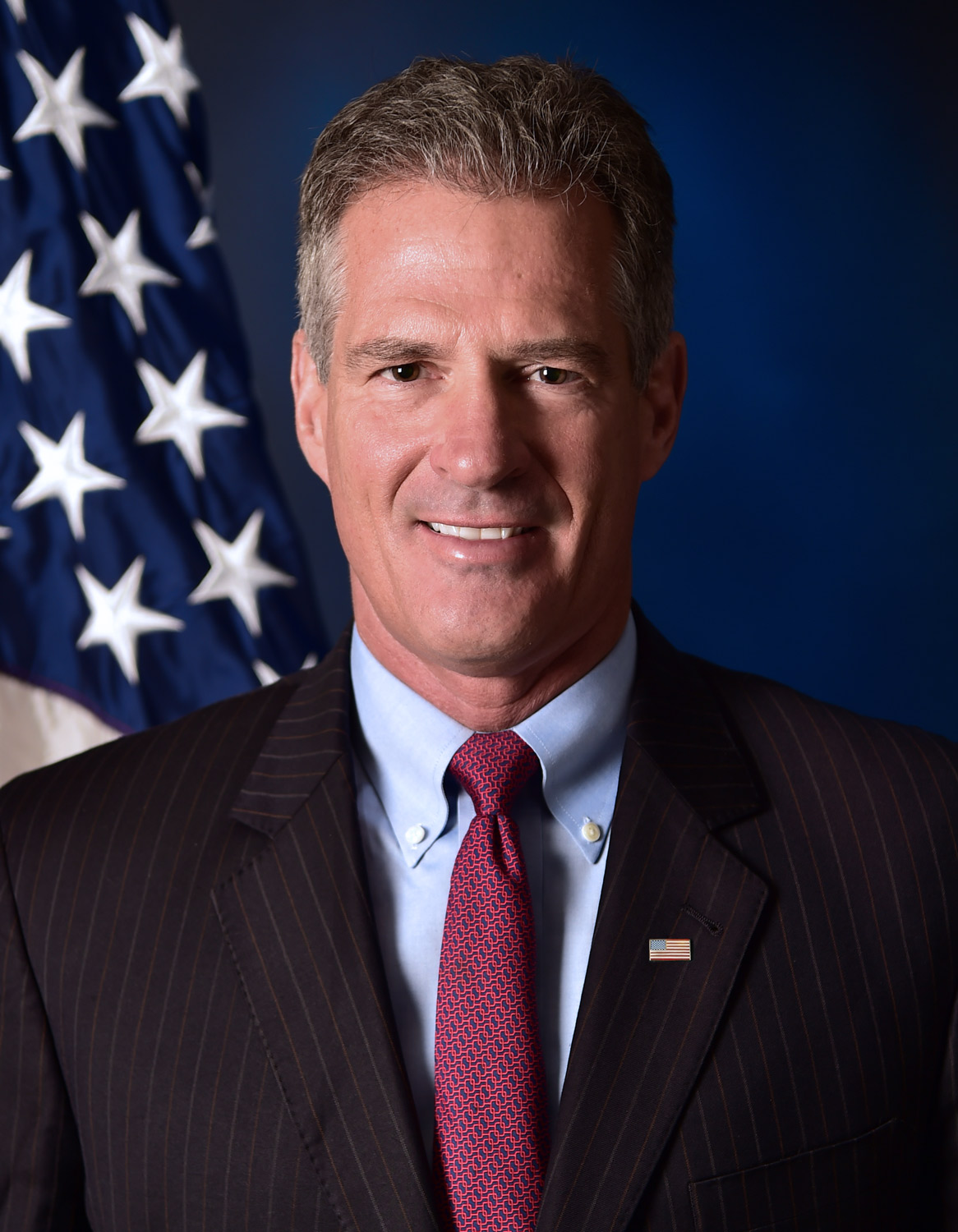
Scott Brown

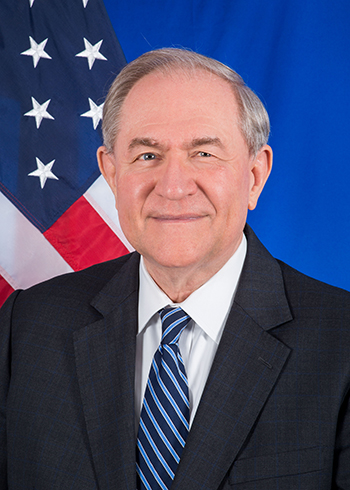
Jim Gilmore

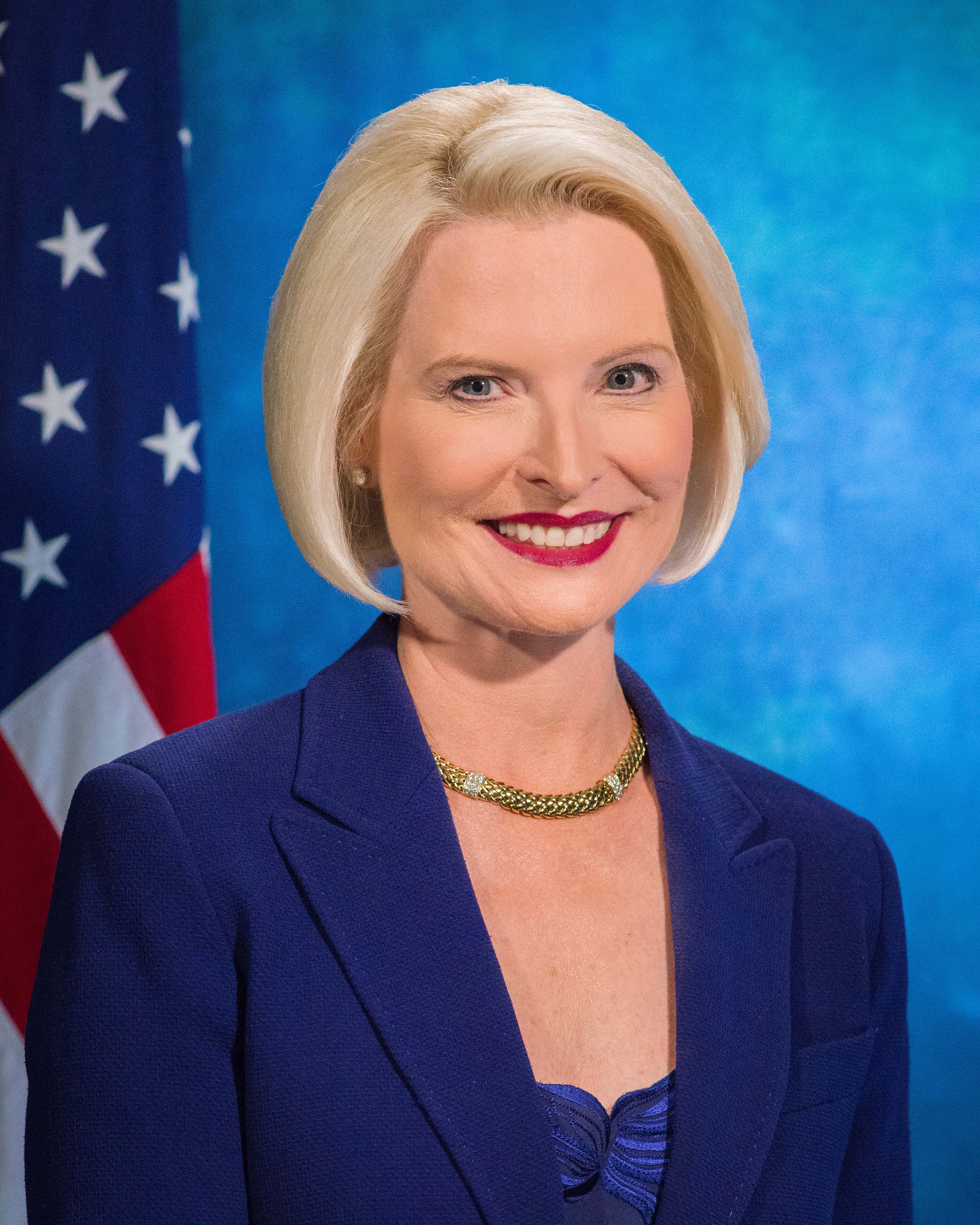
Callista Gingrich

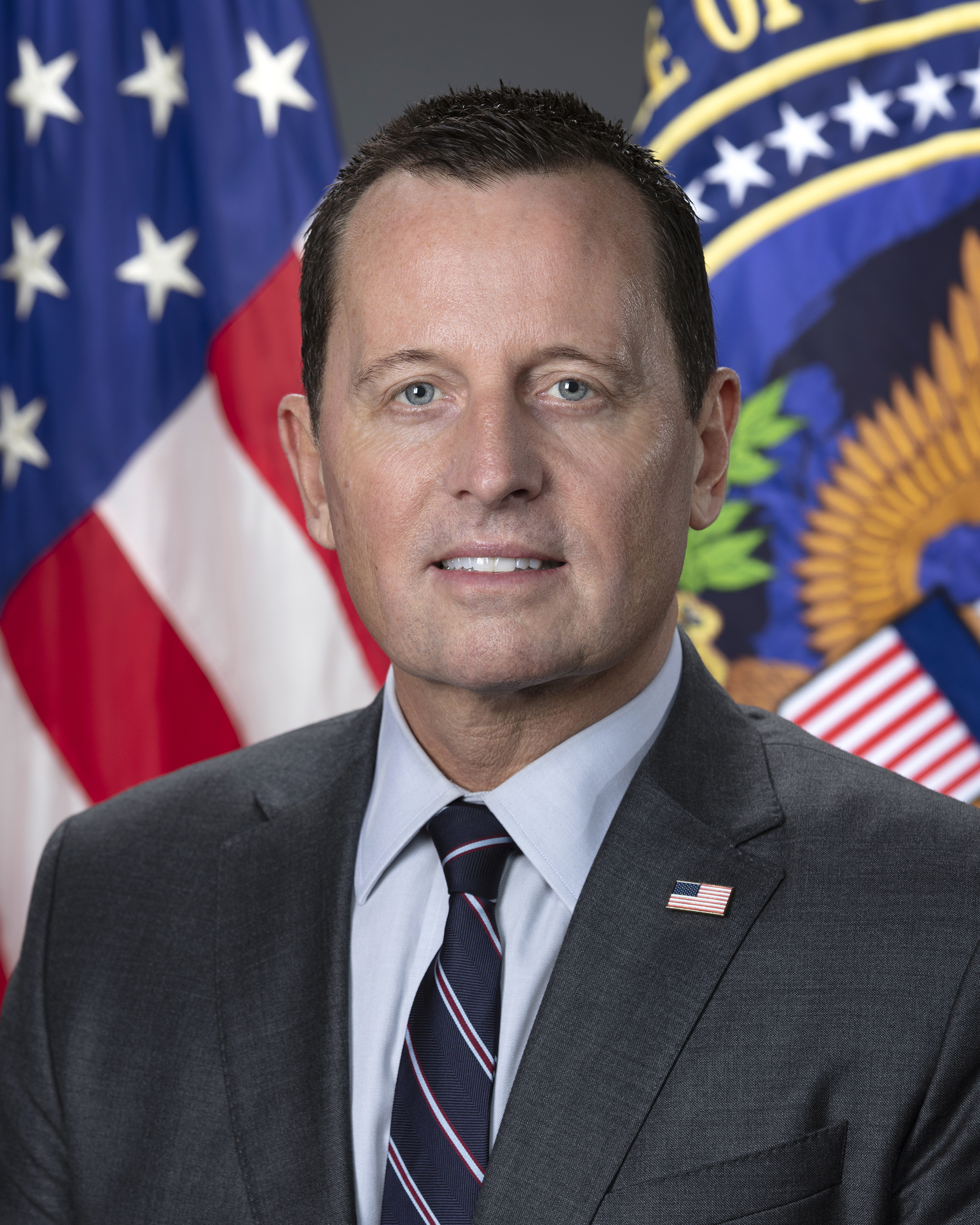
Richard Grenell

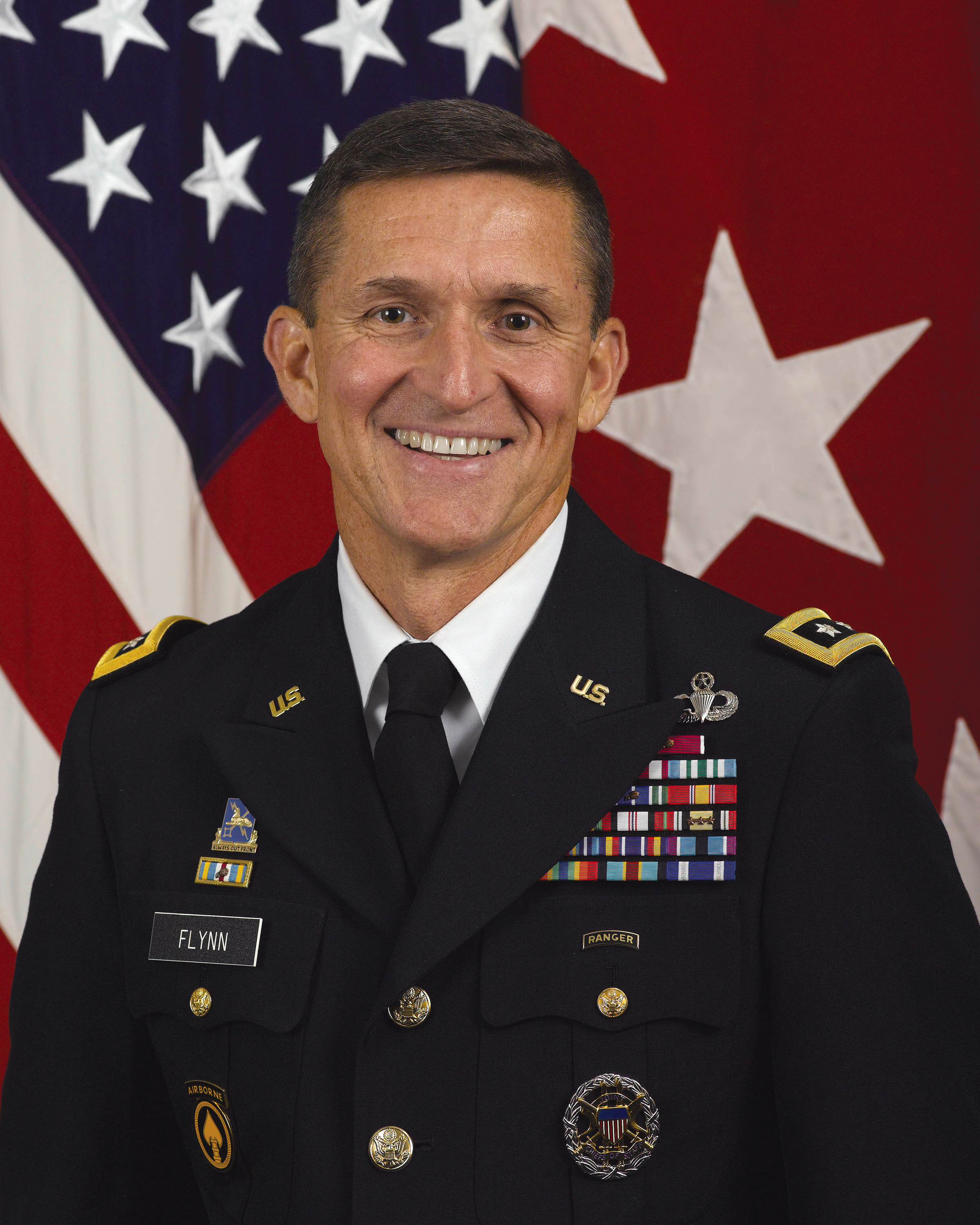
Michael Flynn

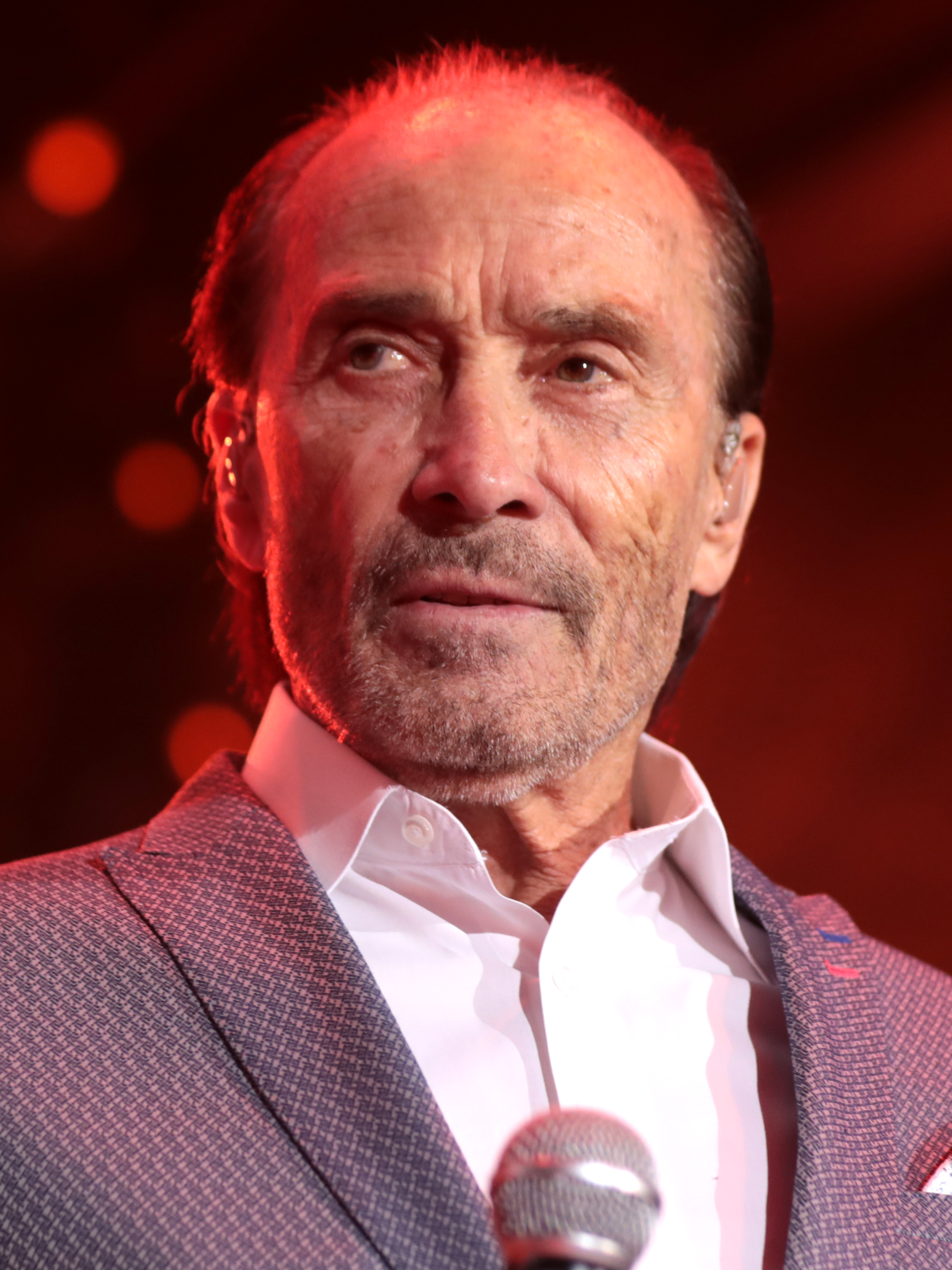
Lee Greenwood

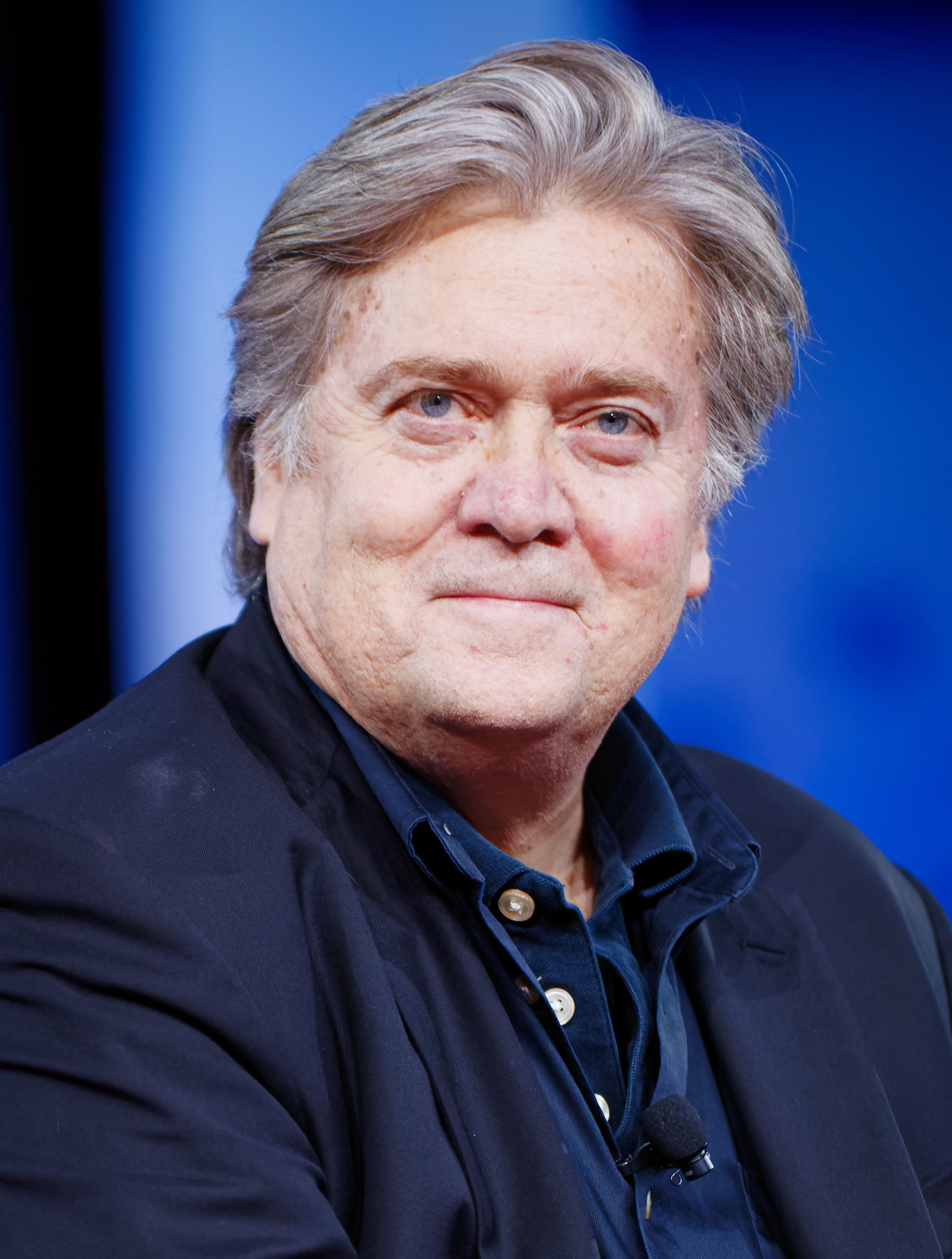
Steve Bannon

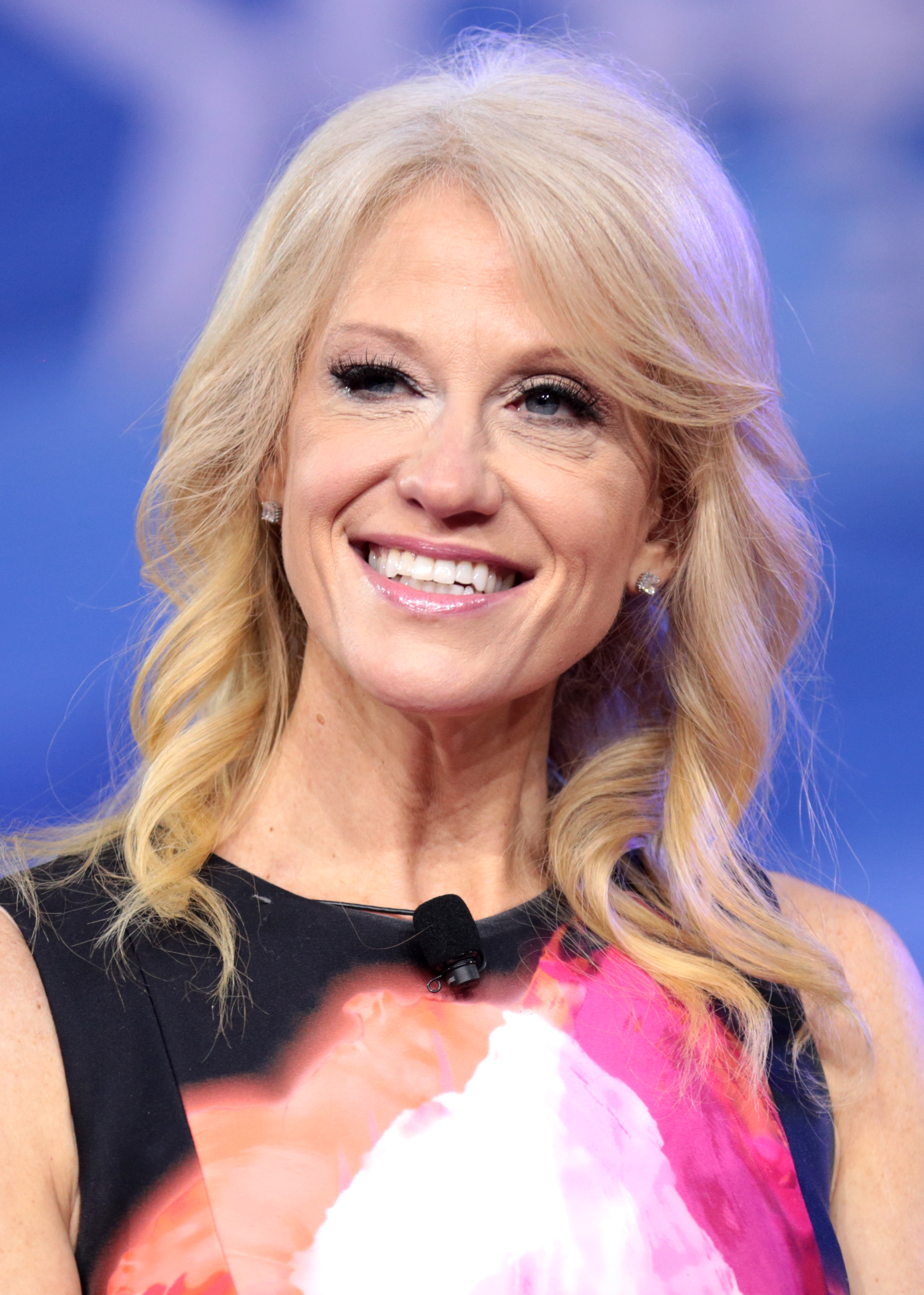
Kellyanne Conway

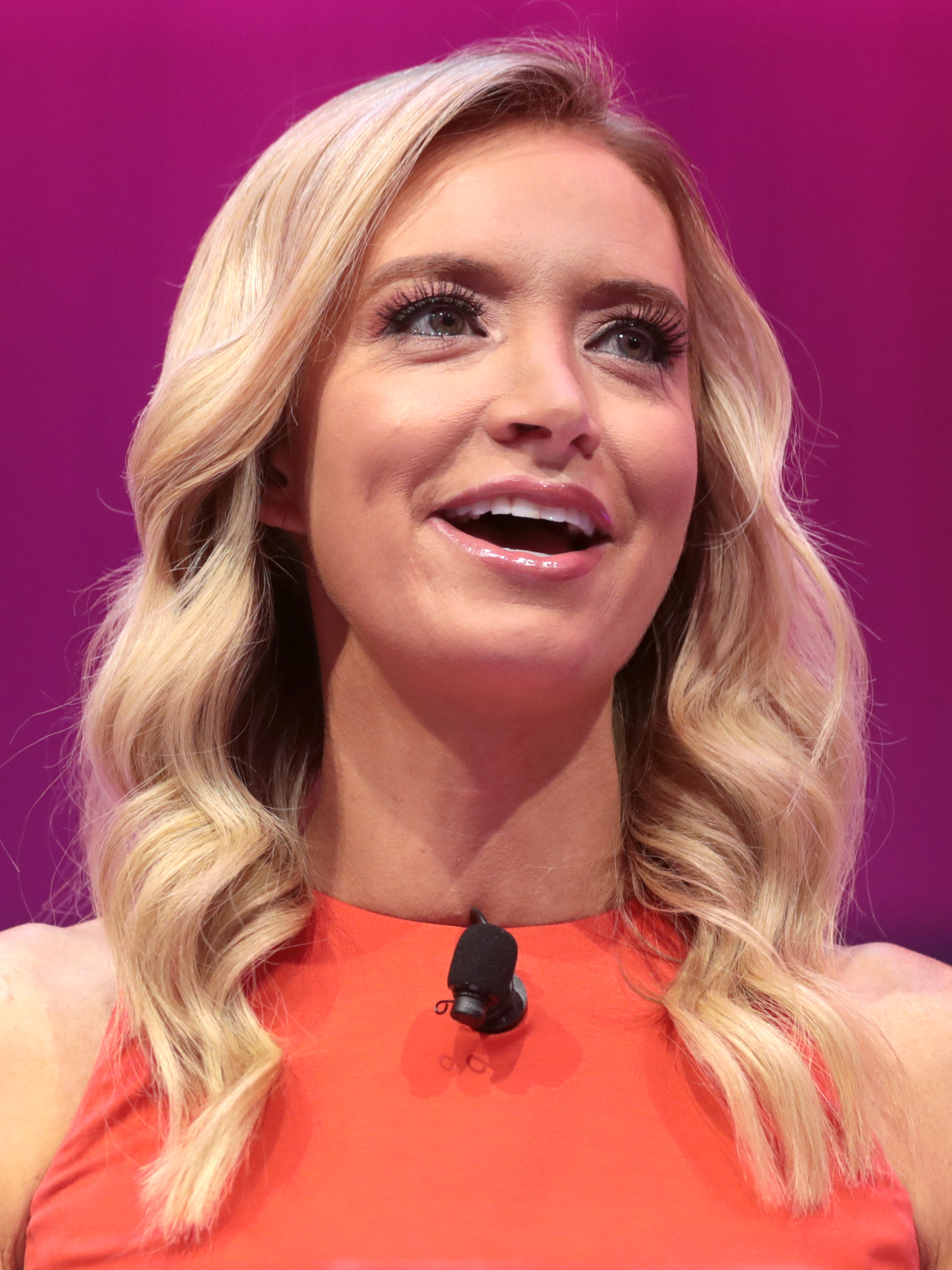
Kayleigh McEnany

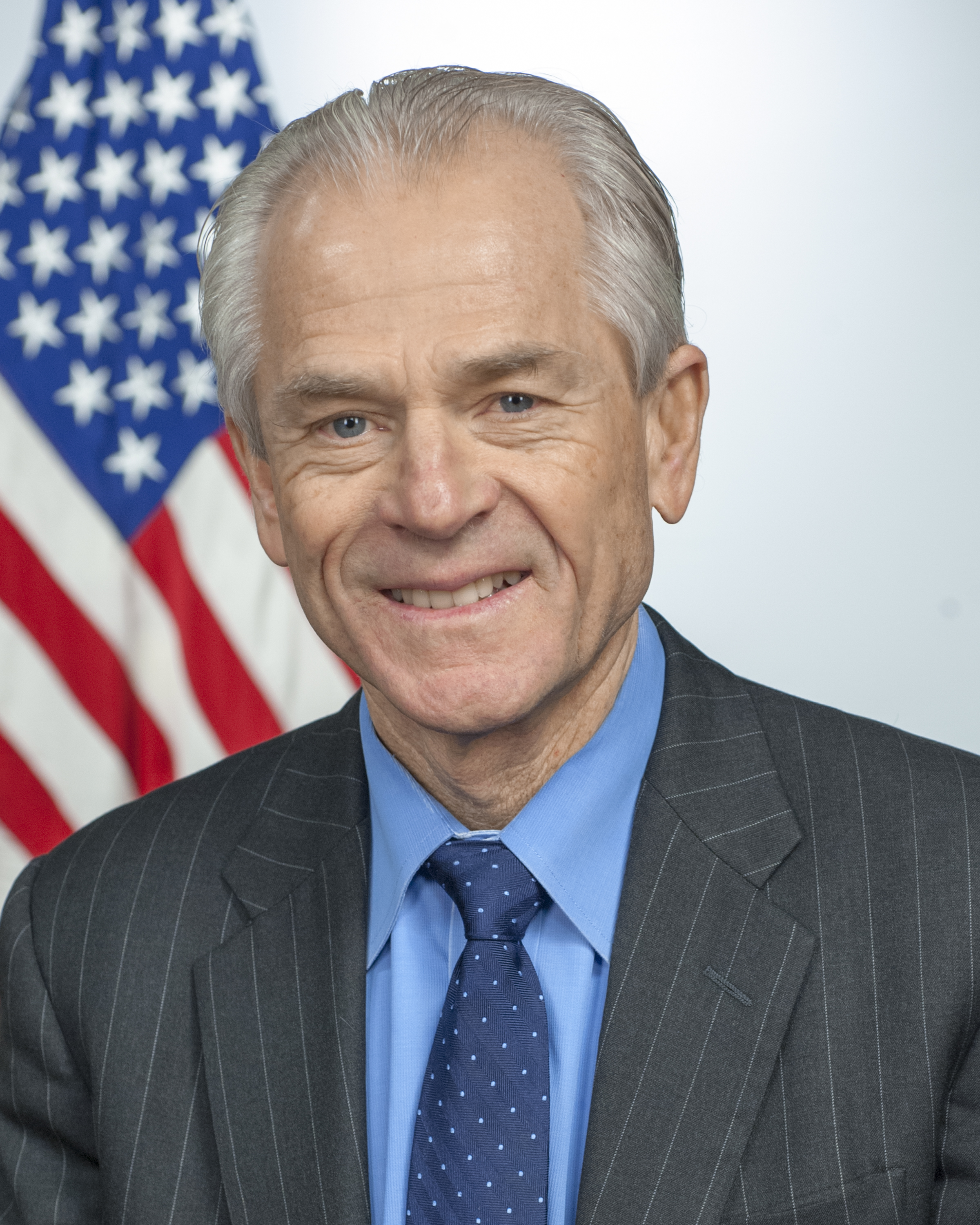
Peter Navarro

=== Cabinet-level officials ===
- Alexander Acosta, 27th United States Secretary of Labor (2017–2019), Dean of the Florida International University College of Law (2009–2017), and United States Attorney for the Southern District of Florida (2005–2009)
- William Barr, 77th & 85th United States Attorney General (1991–1993, 2019–2020) and 25th United States Deputy Attorney General (1990–1991)
- David Bernhardt, 53rd United States Secretary of the Interior (2019–2021) and 7th United States Deputy Secretary of the Interior (2017–2019)
- Jovita Carranza, 26th Administrator of the Small Business Administration (2020–2021), 44th Treasurer of the United States (2017–2020), and Deputy Administrator of the Small Business Administration (2006–2009)
- Ben Carson, 17th United States Secretary of Housing and Urban Development (2017–2021)
- Kelly Craft, 30th United States Ambassador to the United Nations (2019–2021) and United States Ambassador to Canada (2017–2019)
- Betsy DeVos, 11th United States Secretary of Education (2017–2021)
- Nikki Haley, 29th United States Ambassador to the United Nations (2017–2018) and 116th Governor of South Carolina (2011–2017)
- Robert Lighthizer, 18th United States Trade Representative (2017–2021) and 1st United States Deputy Trade Representative (1983–1985)
- Linda McMahon, 25th Administrator of the Small Business Administration (2017–2019)
- Mark Meadows, 29th White House Chief of Staff (2020–2021) and Ranking Member of the House Oversight Committee (2020)
- Christopher C. Miller, United States Secretary of Defense (2020–2021), 6th Director of the National Counterterrorism Center (2020), and Assistant Secretary of Defense for Special Operations and Low-Intensity Conflict (2020)
- Steven Mnuchin, 77th United States Secretary of the Treasury (2017–2021)
- Peter O'Rourke, Acting United States Secretary of Veterans Affairs (2018)
- Rick Perry, 14th United States Secretary of Energy (2017–2019) and 47th Governor of Texas (2000–2015)
- Mike Pompeo, 70th United States Secretary of State (2018–2021) and 6th Director of the Central Intelligence Agency (2017–2018)
- Reince Priebus, 27th White House Chief of Staff (2017), 64th Chair of the Republican National Committee (2011–2017), and Chair of the Republican Party of Wisconsin (2007–2011)
- John Ratcliffe, 6th Director of National Intelligence (2020–2021) and Member of the U.S. House of Representatives from Texas's 4th district (2015–2020)
- Wilbur Ross, 39th United States Secretary of Commerce (2017–2021)
- Eugene Scalia, 28th United States Secretary of Labor (2019–2021) and 25th United States Solicitor of Labor (2002–2003)
- Jeff Sessions, 84th United States Attorney General (2017–2018) and United States Senator from Alabama (1997–2017)
- Russell Vought, 42nd Director of the Office of Management and Budget (2019–2021) and Deputy Director of the Office of Management and Budget (2018–2020)
- Robert Wilkie, 10th United States Secretary of Veterans Affairs (2018–2021), 8th Under Secretary of Defense for Personnel and Readiness (2017–2018), and 25th Assistant Secretary of Defense for Legislative Affairs (2006–2009)
- Matthew Whitaker, Acting United States Attorney General (2018–2019) and United States Attorney for the Southern District of Iowa (2004–2009)
- Chad Wolf, United States Secretary of Homeland Security (2019–2021), Under Secretary of Homeland Security for Strategy, Policy, and Plans (2019–2021), and Assistant Secretary of Homeland Security for Strategy, Plans, Analysis, and Risk (2018–2019)

=== Department of Commerce officials ===
- Elizabeth Erin Walsh, Director General of the United States Commercial Service (2017–2018) and Assistant Secretary of Commerce (Global Markets) (2017–2018)

=== Department of Defense officials ===
- Anita K. Blair, Deputy Assistant Secretary of Defense for Civilian Personnel Policy (2017–2020)
- Ezra Cohen, Under Secretary of Defense for Intelligence (2020–2021) and Assistant Secretary of Defense for Special Operations and Low-Intensity Conflict (2020)
- Elbridge Colby, Deputy Assistant Secretary of Defense for Strategy and Force Development (2017–2018)
- Earl G. Matthews, General Counsel of the Department of the Army (2017–2018)
- Mark E. Mitchell, Acting Assistant Secretary of Defense for Special Operations and Low-Intensity Conflict (2017, 2019)
- Paul C. Ney Jr., General Counsel of the Department of Defense (2018–2021) and Acting General Counsel of the Navy (2006)
- Kash Patel, Chief of Staff to the United States Secretary of Defense (2020–2021)
- Gregory J. Slavonic, Acting United States Under Secretary of the Navy (2020–2021)
- James N. Stewart, Acting Under Secretary of Defense for Personnel and Readiness (2018–2019) and Assistant Secretary of Defense for Manpower and Reserve Affairs (2018–2019)
- Anthony Tata, Senior Official Performing the Duties of Under Secretary of Defense for Policy (2020–2021) and Senior Official Performing the Duties of Deputy Under Secretary of Defense for Policy (2020)
- Casey Wardynski, Assistant Secretary of the Army for Manpower and Reserve Affairs (2019–2021)

=== Department of Energy officials ===
- Paul Dabbar, Under Secretary of Energy for Science (2017–2021)
- Karen Evans, Assistant Secretary of Energy for Cybersecurity, Energy Security, and Emergency Response (2018–2020)

=== Department of Health and Human Services officials ===
- Michael Caputo, Assistant Secretary of Health and Human Services for Public Affairs (2020–2021)
- Mehmet Oz, Co-chairman of the President's Council on Sports, Fitness, and Nutrition (2018–2022)
- Robert R. Redfield, 18th Director of the Centers for Disease Control and Prevention (2018–2021)
- Vanila Singh, Chief Medical Officer, OASH, HHS (2017–2019)
- Herschel Walker, Co-Chair of the President's Council on Physical Fitness and Sports (2018–2022)

=== Department of Homeland Security officials ===
- Troy Edgar, Chief Financial Officer of the United States Department of Homeland Security (2020–2021)
- Tom Homan, Senior Official Performing the Duties of the Director of U.S. Immigration and Customs Enforcement (2017–2018)
- Mark A. Morgan, Acting Commissioner of U.S. Customs and Border Protection (2019–2021)
- Rodney S. Scott, 24th Chief of the United States Border Patrol (2020–2021)
- Ronald Vitiello, Acting Director of the U.S. Immigration and Customs Enforcement (2018–2019)

=== Department of Housing and Urban Development officials ===
- Lynne Patton Administrator of the United States Department of Housing and Urban Development for Region II (2017–2021)

=== Department of the Interior officials ===
- Douglas Domenech, United States Assistant Secretary of the Interior for Insular Areas (2017–2021)

=== Department of Justice officials ===
- Kurt Alme, United States Attorney for the District of Montana (2017–2020)
- Michael G. Bailey, United States Attorney for the District of Arizona (2019–2021)
- John Bash, United States Attorney for the Western District of Texas (2017–2020)
- Scott Brady, United States Attorney for the Western District of Pennsylvania (2017–2021)
- Robert S. Brewer Jr., United States Attorney for the Southern District of California (2019–2021)
- Maria Chapa Lopez, United States Attorney for the Middle District of Florida (2018–2021)
- Jeffrey Clark, United States Assistant Attorney General for the Civil Division (2020–2021) and United States Assistant Attorney General for the Environment and Natural Resources Division (2018–2021)
- Donald Q. Cochran, United States Attorney for the Middle District of Tennessee (2017–2021)
- Bart Davis, United States Attorney for the District of Idaho (2017–2021)
- Makan Delrahim, United States Assistant Attorney General for the Antitrust Division (2017–2021)
- David M. DeVillers, United States Attorney for the Southern District of Ohio (2019–2021)
- D. Michael Dunavant, United States Attorney for the Western District of Tennessee (2017–2021)
- Timothy A. Garrison, United States Attorney for the Western District of Missouri (2018–2021)
- Robert Higdon Jr., United States Attorney for the Eastern District of North Carolina (2017–2021)
- Jeffrey Jensen, United States Attorney for the Eastern District of Missouri (2017–2020)
- Larry Keefe, United States Attorney for the Northern District of Florida (2019–2021)
- Mark Klaassen, United States Attorney for the District of Wyoming (2017–2021)
- Brian Kuester, United States Attorney for the Eastern District of Oklahoma (2017–2021)
- Peter M. McCoy Jr., United States Attorney for the District of South Carolina (2020–2021)
- Joshua Minkler, United States Attorney for the Southern District of Indiana (2017–2020)
- Brian T. Moran, United States Attorney for the Western District of Washington (2019–2021)
- R. Andrew Murray, United States Attorney for the Western District of North Carolina (2017–2021)
- Ryan Patrick, United States Attorney for the Southern District of Texas (2018–2021)
- William J. Powell, United States Attorney for the Northern District of West Virginia (2017–2021)
- Michael R. Sherwin, Acting United States Attorney for the District of Columbia (2020–2021)
- R. Trent Shores, United States Attorney for the Northern District of Oklahoma (2017–2021)
- Gregg N. Sofer, United States Attorney for the Western District of Texas
- Jay Town, United States Attorney for the Northern District of Alabama (2017–2020)

=== Department of State officials ===
- Robin Bernstein, United States Ambassador to the Dominican Republic (2018–2021)
- Lynda Blanchard, United States Ambassador to Slovenia (2019–2021)
- Andrew Bremberg, Permanent Representative of the United States to the European Office of the United Nations (2019–2021)
- Terry Branstad, 12th United States Ambassador to China (2017–2020) and 39th and 42nd Governor of Iowa (2011–2017, 1983–1999)
- Ulrich Brechbuhl, 34th Counselor of the United States Department of State (2018–2021) and Under Secretary of State for Public Diplomacy and Public Affairs (2020)
- Scott Brown, United States Ambassador to New Zealand (2017–2020), United States Ambassador to Samoa (2017–2020) and United States Senator from Massachusetts (2010–2013)
- Brian Bulatao, 15th Under Secretary of State for Management (2019–2021)
- Thomas L. Carter, Permanent Representative of the United States to the International Civil Aviation Organization (2017–2020)
- Joseph Cella, United States Ambassador to Fiji (2019–2021), United States Ambassador to Kiribati (2019–2021), United States Ambassador to Nauru (2019–2021), United States Ambassador to Tonga (2019–2021), and United States Ambassador to Tuvalu (2019–2021)
- Ellie Cohanim, Deputy Special Envoy to Monitor and Combat Anti-Semitism (2019–2021)
- David B. Cornstein, United States Ambassador to Hungary (2018–2020)
- Michael G. DeSombre, United States Ambassador to Thailand (2020–2021)
- Robert Destro, United States Special Coordinator for Tibetan Issues (2020–2021)
- Hugh Dugan, Acting Special Envoy for Hostage Affairs (2019–2020)
- Randy Evans, United States Ambassador to Luxembourg (2018–2021)
- David T. Fischer, 21st United States Ambassador to Morocco (2020–2021)
- David M. Friedman, United States Ambassador to Israel (2017–2021)
- Ronald Gidwitz, Acting United States Ambassador to the European Union (2020–2021)
- Jim Gilmore, United States Ambassador to the Organization for Security and Cooperation in Europe (2019–2021) and Chair of the Republican National Committee (2001)
- Callista Gingrich, 11th United States Ambassador to the Holy See (2017–2021)
- George Edward Glass, United States Ambassador to Portugal (2017–2021)
- Jason Greenblatt, Special Representative for International Negotiations (2017–2019)
- Richard Grenell, Special Presidential Envoy for Serbia and Kosovo Peace Negotiations (2019–2021), United States Ambassador to Germany (2018–2020), and Director of National Intelligence (2020)
- Jeffrey Ross Gunter, United States Ambassador to Iceland (2019–2021)
- Ken Howery, United States Ambassador to Sweden (2019–2021)
- Ronald D. Johnson, United States Ambassador to El Salvador (2019–2021)
- Woody Johnson, 66th United States Ambassador to the United Kingdom (2017–2021)
- Zalmay Khalilzad, U.S. Special Representative for Afghanistan Reconciliation (2018–2021), 26th United States Ambassador to the United Nations (2007–2009), United States Ambassador to Iraq (2005–2007), and 15th United States Ambassador to Afghanistan (2004–2005)
- Stephen B. King, United States Ambassador to the Czech Republic (2017–2021)
- W. Robert Kohorst, United States Ambassador to Croatia (2018–2021)
- Keith J. Krach, 20th Under Secretary of State for Economic Growth, Energy, and the Environment (2019–2021)
- Christopher Landau, United States Ambassador to Mexico (2019–2021)
- Lana Marks, United States Ambassador to South Africa (2020–2021)
- Jamie McCourt, United States Ambassador to France and Monaco (2017–2021)
- Kevin Moley, 27th Assistant Secretary of State for International Organization Affairs (2018–2019)
- Georgette Mosbacher, United States Ambassador to Poland (2018–2021)
- Morgan Ortagus, 28th Spokesperson for the United States Department of State (2019–2021)
- Ed McMullen, United States Ambassador to Switzerland and Liechtenstein (2017–2021)
- Mick Mulvaney, United States Special Envoy for Northern Ireland (2020–2021), White House Chief of Staff (2019–2020), and 41st Director of the Office of Management and Budget (2017–2020)
- J. Peter Pham, U.S. Special Envoy for the Sahel Region of Africa (2020–2021) and United States Special Envoy for the African Great Lakes (2018–2020)
- Yleem Poblete, 4th Assistant Secretary of State for Arms Control, Verification, and Compliance (2018–2019)
- John Rakolta, United States Ambassador to the United Arab Emirates (2019–2021)
- Leandro Rizzuto Jr., Consul General in Hamilton, Bermuda (2020–2021)
- Nathan Sales, Special Presidential Envoy for the Global Coalition to Counter the Islamic State of Iraq and the Levant (2020–2021), 18th Coordinator for Counterterrorism (2017–2021), and Acting Under Secretary of State for Civilian Security, Democracy, and Human Rights (2017–2020)
- Carla Sands, United States Ambassador to Denmark (2017–2021)
- Manisha Singh, 25th Assistant Secretary of State for Economic and Business Affairs (2017–2021) and Acting Under Secretary for Economic Growth, Energy, and the Environment (2018–2019)
- Kiron Skinner, 30th Director of Policy Planning (2018–2019)
- Gordon Sondland, 20th United States Ambassador to the European Union (2018–2020)
- Donald Tapia, United States Ambassador to Jamaica (2019–2021)
- Kip E. Tom, United States Ambassador to the United Nations Agencies for Food and Agriculture (2019–2021)
- Trevor Traina, United States Ambassador to Austria (2018–2021)
- Carlos Trujillo, 20th United States Ambassador to the Organization of American States (2018–2021)
- Eric Ueland, Under Secretary of State for Civilian Security, Democracy, and Human Rights (2020–2021)
- Adrian Zuckerman, US Ambassador to Romania (2019–2021)

=== Department of the Treasury officials ===
- Marshall Billingslea, Assistant Secretary of the Treasury for Terrorist Financing (2017–2021)
- Monica Crowley, Assistant Secretary of the Treasury for Public Affairs (2019–2021)
- Mitchell Silk, Assistant Secretary of the Treasury for International Markets (2019–2021)

=== Department of Veterans Affairs officials ===
- Paul Lawrence, 7th Under Secretary of Veterans Affairs for Benefits (2018–2021)

=== Executive Office officials ===
- Nick Ayers, Chief of Staff to the Vice President (2017–2019)
- Peter J. Brown, Special Representative for Puerto Rico (2020–2021) and 9th Homeland Security Advisor (2019–2020)
- Frederick H. Fleitz, Executive Secretary and Chief of Staff of the United States National Security Council (2018)
- Michael Flynn, 24th United States National Security Advisor (2017) and Director of the Defense Intelligence Agency (2012–2014)
- Joe Grogan, Director of the Domestic Policy Council (2019–2020)
- Keith Kellogg, National Security Advisor to the Vice President of the United States (2018–2021) and Executive Secretary and Chief of Staff of the United States National Security Council (2017–2018)
- Larry Kudlow, 12th Director of the National Economic Council (2018–2021)
- K. T. McFarland, 28th United States Deputy National Security Advisor (2017)
- Robert C. O'Brien, 27th United States National Security Advisor (2019–2021) and 2nd Special Envoy for Hostage Affairs (2018–2019)
- Scott Pace, Executive Secretary of the National Space Council (2017–2021)
- Brooke Rollins, Director of the Domestic Policy Council (2020–2021)

=== Other federal officials ===
- John Barsa, Acting Deputy Administrator of the United States Agency for International Development (2020–2021) and Acting Administrator of the United States Agency for International Development (2020)
- Gary Bauer, Member of the United States Commission on International Religious Freedom (2018–2021) and 2nd President of the Family Research Council (1988–1999)
- Don Benton, 13th Director of the Selective Service System (2017–2021)
- Adam Boehler, CEO of U.S. International Development Finance Corporation (2019–2021)
- J. Steven Dowd, United States Director of the European Bank for Reconstruction and Development (2020–2021)
- Bonnie Glick, Deputy Administrator of the United States Agency for International Development (2019–2020)
- Lee Greenwood, former member of the National Council on the Arts (2008–2022)
- James Morhard, 14th Deputy Administrator of the National Aeronautics and Space Administration (2018–2021)
- Jennifer Nordquist, U.S. Executive Director of the World Bank (2018–2021)
- Andrew Saul, 16th Commissioner of the Social Security Administration (2019–2021)
- David Urban, Chair of the American Battle Monuments Commission (2018–2021)
- Ray Washburne, President and CEO of the Overseas Private Investment Corporation (2017–2019)
- Paula White-Cain, Special Advisor to the White House Office of Faith-Based and Neighborhood Partnerships (2018–2021)
- Stephen J. Yates, President of Radio Free Asia (2020–2021)

=== White House officials ===
- Steve Bannon, Senior Counselor to the President (2017)
- Kellyanne Conway, Senior Counselor to the President (2017–2020)
- Rick Dearborn, White House Deputy Chief of Staff for Policy (2017–2018)
- Hogan Gidley, White House Deputy Press Secretary (2019–2020)
- Brian Jack, White House Political Director (2019–2021)
- Derek Lyons, Counselor to the President (2020) and White House Staff Secretary (2018–2020)
- Kayleigh McEnany, 33rd White House Press Secretary (2020–2021)
- John McEntee, Director of the White House Presidential Personnel Office (2020–2021) and Personal Aide to the President (2017–2018)
- Stephen Miller, Senior Advisor to the President (2017–2021) and White House Director of Speechwriting (2017–2021)
- Peter Navarro, Director of the Office of Trade and Manufacturing Policy (2017–2021) and Director of the National Trade Council (2017)
- Dan Scavino, White House Deputy Chief of Staff for Communications (2020–2021) and Senior Advisor to the President for Digital Strategy (2019–2021)
- Mercedes Schlapp, 2nd White House Director of Strategic Communications (2017–2019)
- Cliff Sims, Deputy Director of National Intelligence for Strategy and Communications
- Ja'Ron Smith, Deputy Director of the Office of American Innovation (2019–2020)
- Ivanka Trump, Director of the Office of Economic Initiatives and Entrepreneurship (2017–2021) (Trump's daughter)
- Melania Trump, First Lady of the United States (2017–2021) (Trump's wife)
- Scott Turner, Executive Director of the White House Opportunity and Revitalization Council (2019–2021)

== Former executive branch officials ==
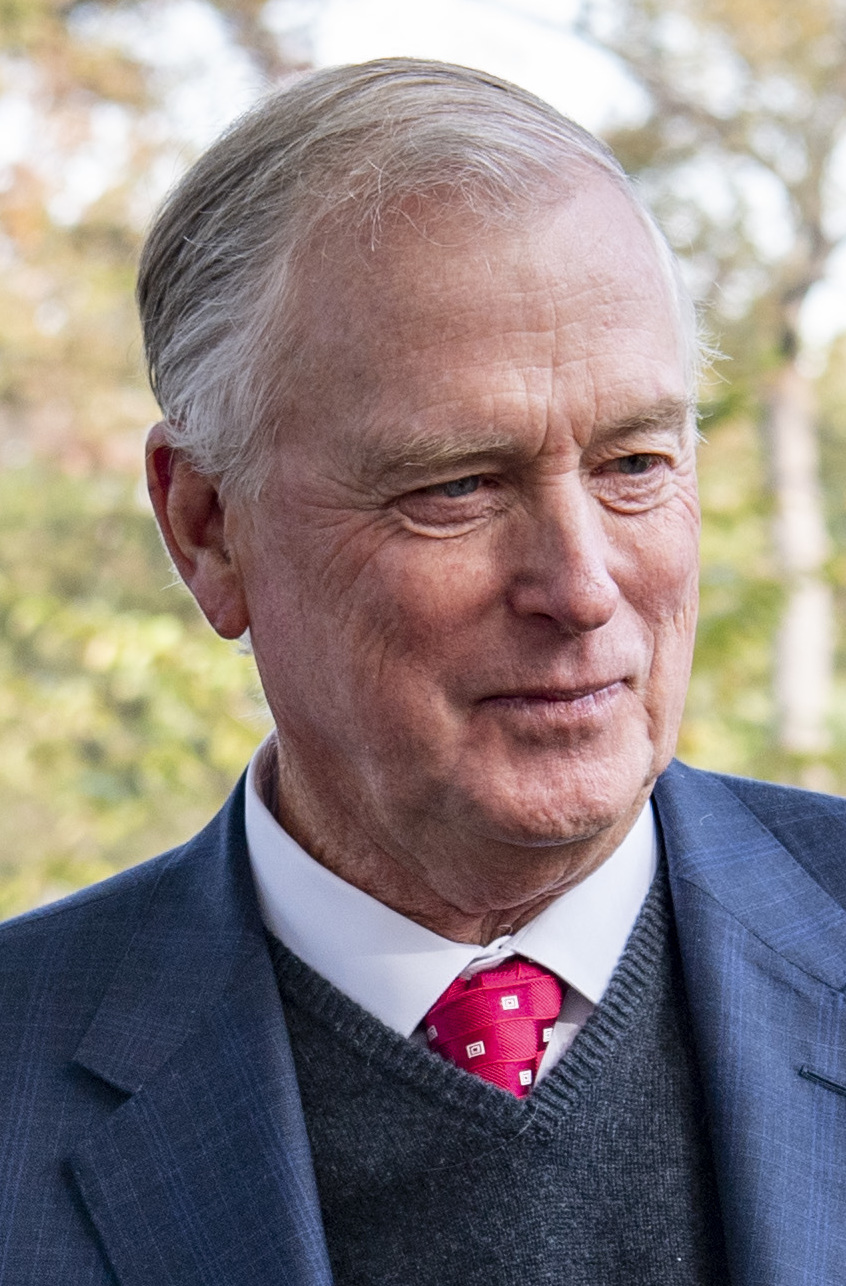
Dan Quayle

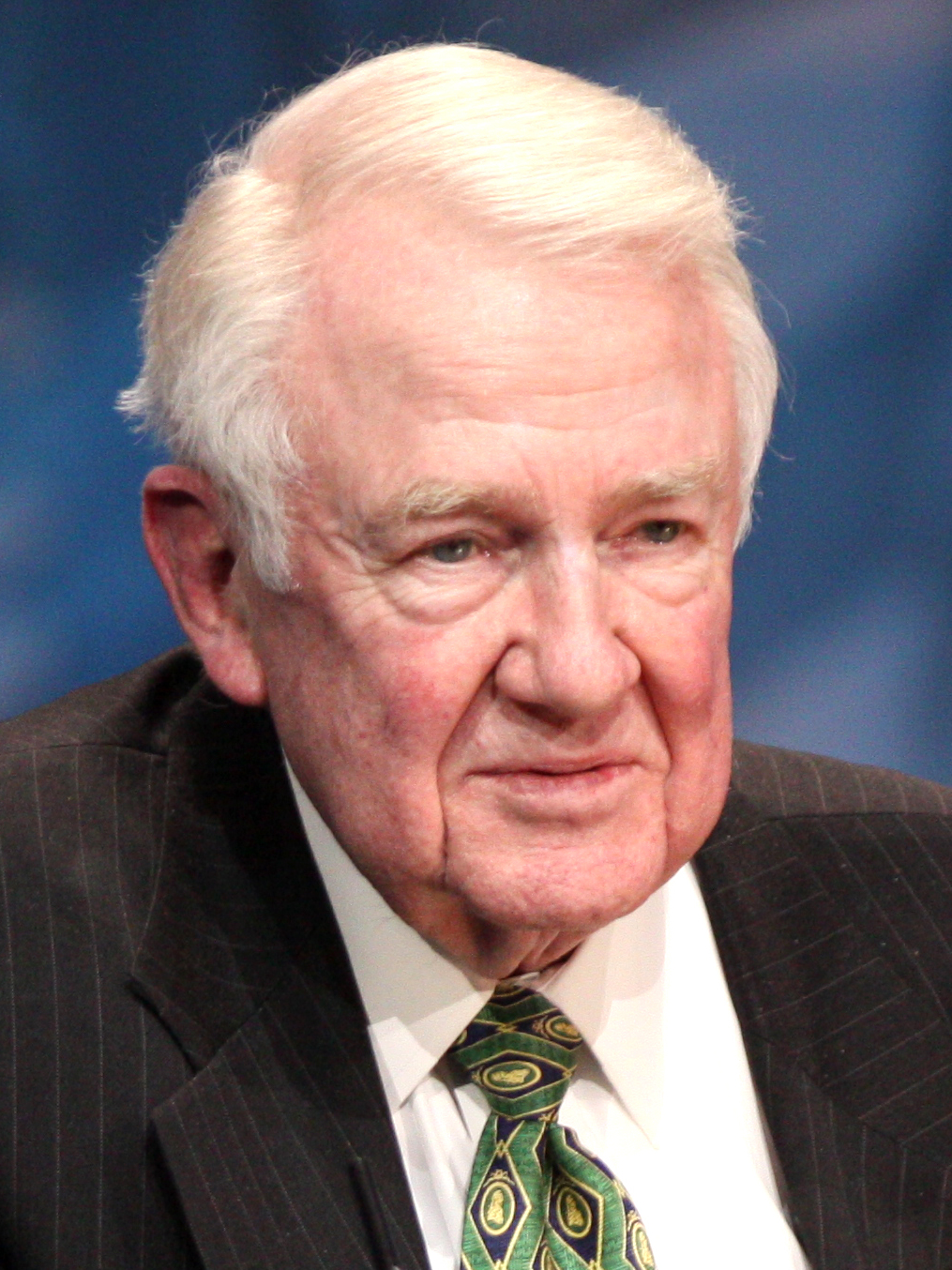
Edwin Meese

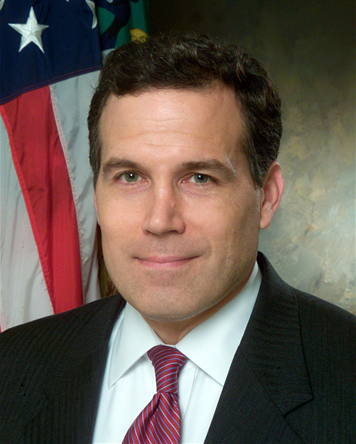
David McCormick

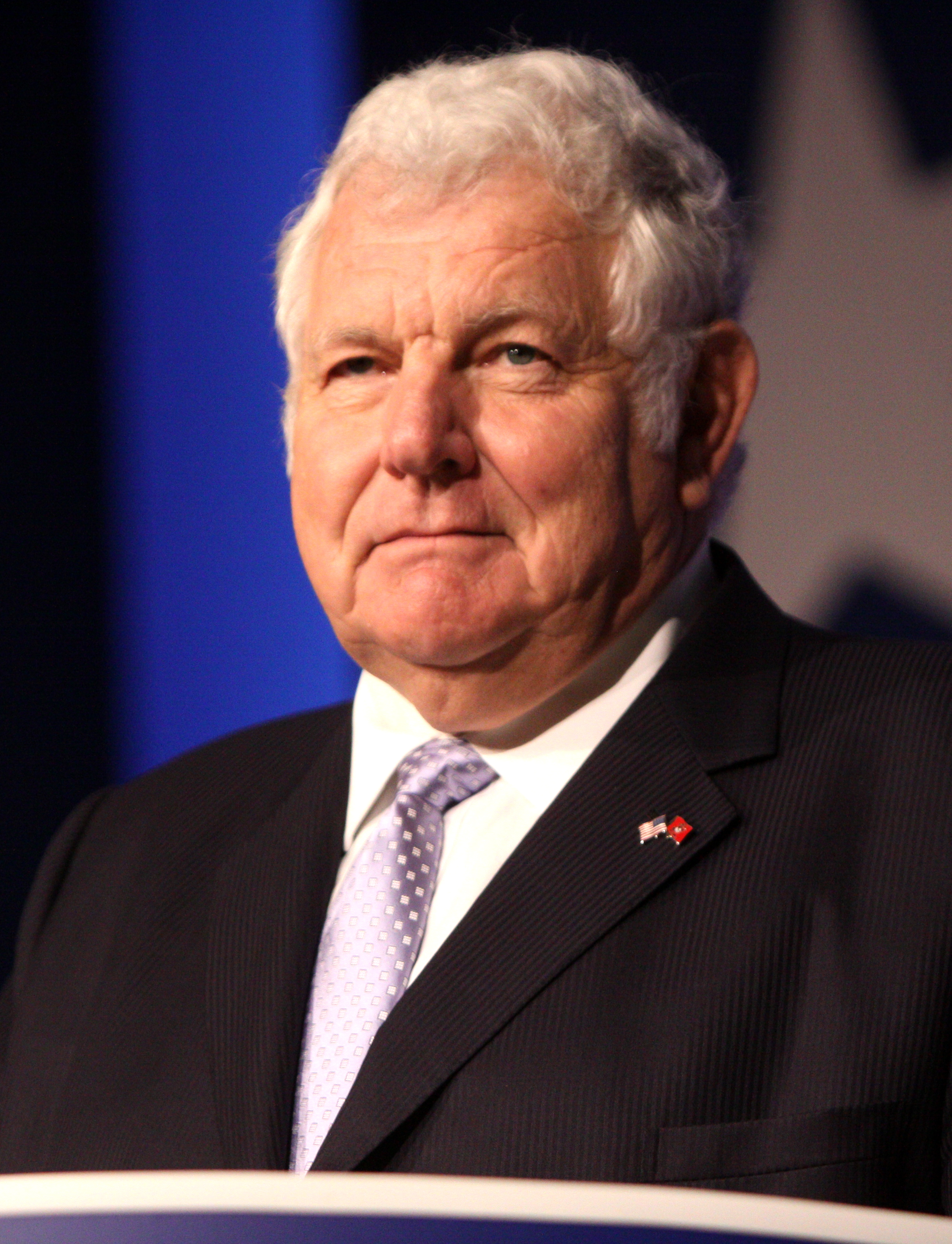
William Bennett

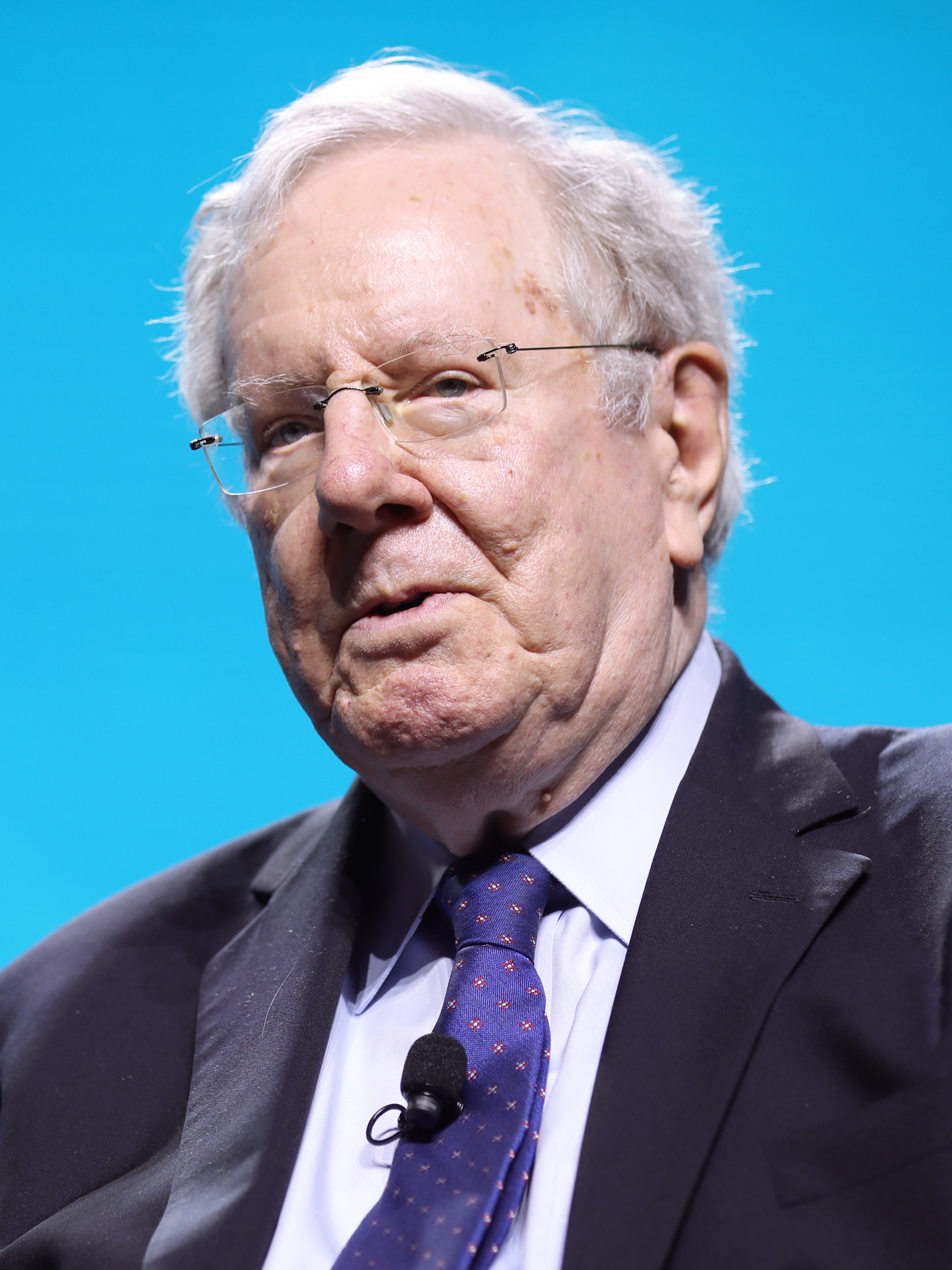
Steve Forbes

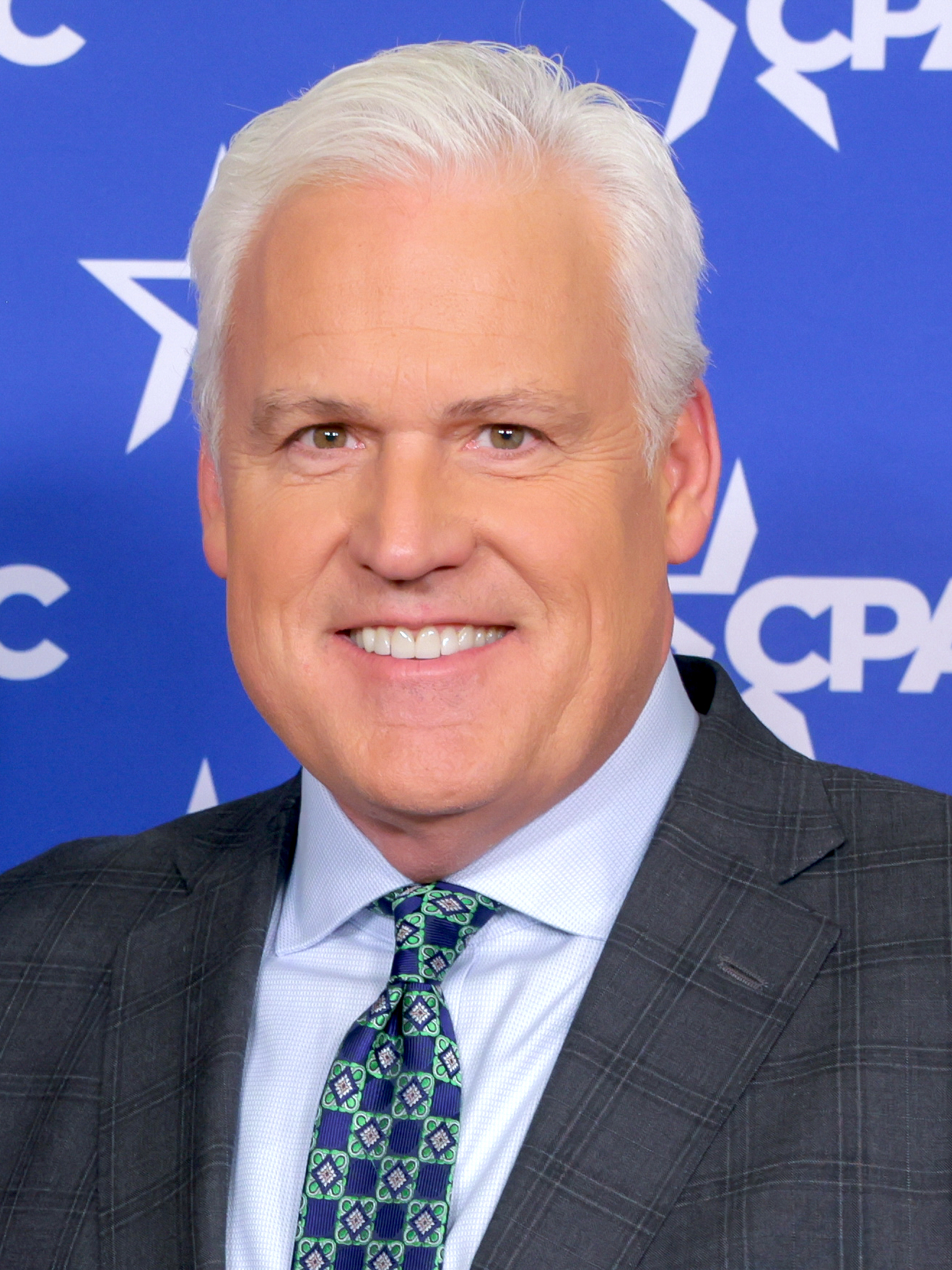
Matt Schlapp

=== Former Vice Presidents ===
- Dan Quayle, 44th Vice President of the United States (1989–1993), U.S. Senator from Indiana (1981–1989), U.S. Representative from IN-04 (1977–1981)

=== Cabinet-level officials ===
- Edwin Meese, 75th United States Attorney General (1985–1988)
- Jim Nicholson, 5th United States Secretary of Veterans Affairs (2005–2007) and United States Ambassador to the Holy See (2001–2004)
- George J. Terwilliger III, United States Attorney General Acting (1993) and 26th United States Deputy Attorney General (1991–1993)

=== Department of Defense officials ===
- Jed Babbin, Deputy Under Secretary of Defense for Acquisition Planning (1990–1991)
- Tidal W. McCoy, Assistant Secretary of the Air Force (Manpower & Reserve Affairs) (1981–1988)
- Jessica L. Wright, Under Secretary of Defense for Personnel and Readiness (2013–2015) and United States Assistant Secretary of Defense for Reserve Affairs (2012)

=== Department of Justice officials ===
- Joseph Russoniello, U.S. Attorney for the Northern District of California (2008–2010)
- Brett Tolman, United States Attorney for the District of Utah (2006–2009)

=== Department of State officials ===
- Paula Dobriansky, United States Special Envoy for Northern Ireland (2007–2009) and Under Secretary of State for Global Affairs (2001–2009)
- Bradford Higgins, Assistant Secretary of State for Resource Management for Resource Management (2006–2009)
- Ellen Sauerbrey, 11th Assistant Secretary of State for Population, Refugees, and Migration (2006–2007)
- Clifford M. Sobel, United States Ambassador to Brazil (2006–2009) and United States Ambassador to the Netherlands (2001–2005)

=== Department of the Treasury officials ===
- Dave McCormick, Under Secretary of the Treasury for International Affairs (2007–2009)

=== Executive Office officials ===
- William Bennett, Director of the Office of National Drug Control Policy (1989–1990), 3rd United States Secretary of Education (1985–1988), and Chair of the National Endowment for the Humanities (1981–1985)
- William Flynn Martin, Special Assistant to the President for National Security Affairs (1983–1985)
- John Poindexter, 13th United States National Security Advisor (1985–1986) and 13th United States Deputy National Security Advisor (1983–1985)

=== Other federal officials ===
- James J. Carey, Chairman of the U. S. Federal Maritime Commission (1989–1991)
- Hal Daub, Chair of the Social Security Advisory Board (2002–2006) and 48th Mayor of Omaha (1995–2001)
- Steve Forbes, Chairman of the Board for International Broadcasting (1985–1993)
- Reuben Jeffery III, Chairperson of the Commodity Futures Trading Commission (2005–2007)
- David H. Leroy, United States Nuclear Waste Negotiator (1990–1993)
- Daniel FitzGerald Runde, Director of the Global Development Alliance, USAID (2005–2007)

=== White House officials ===
- Matt Schlapp, White House Director of Political Affairs (2003–2005)

== Former members of Congress ==
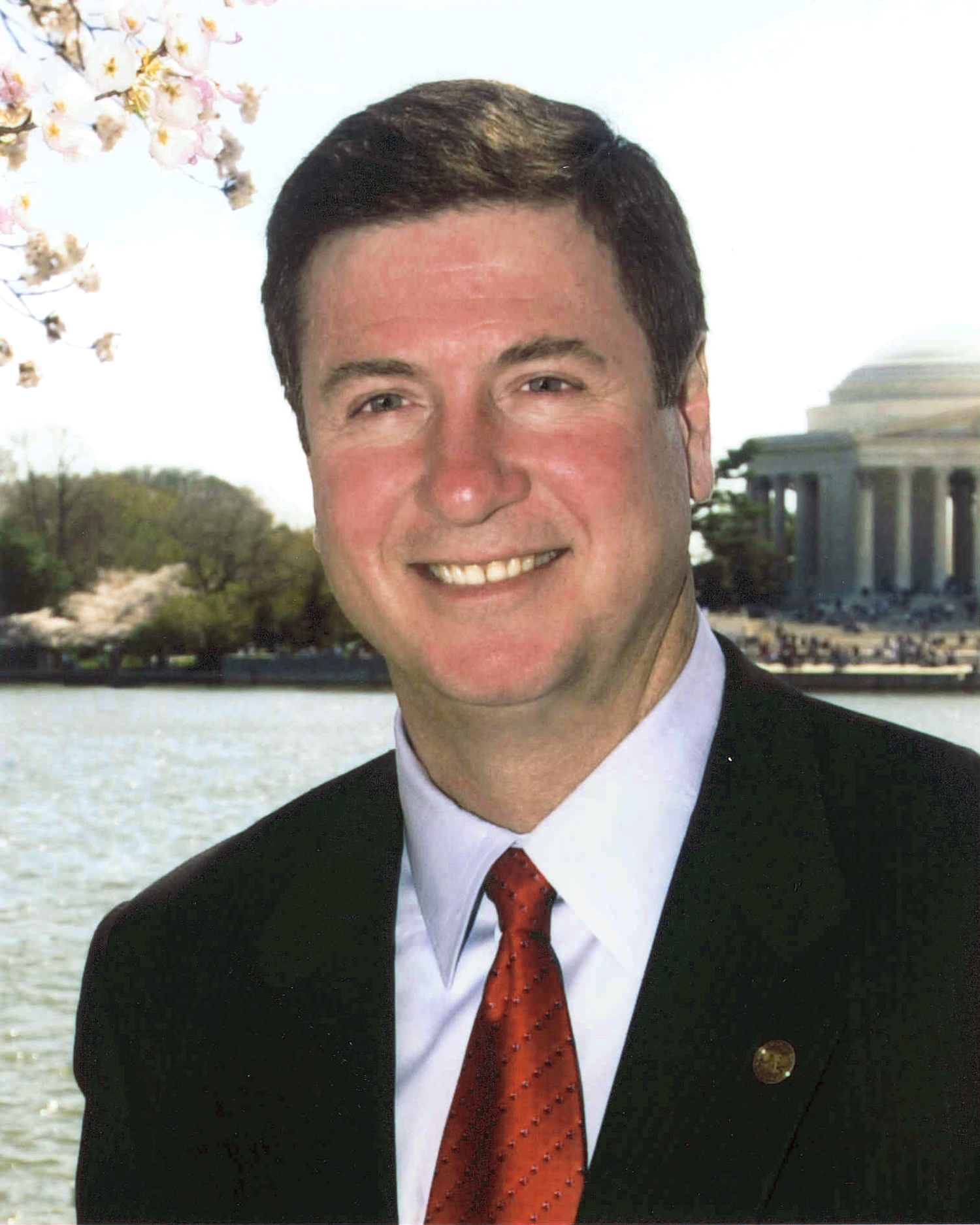
George Allen

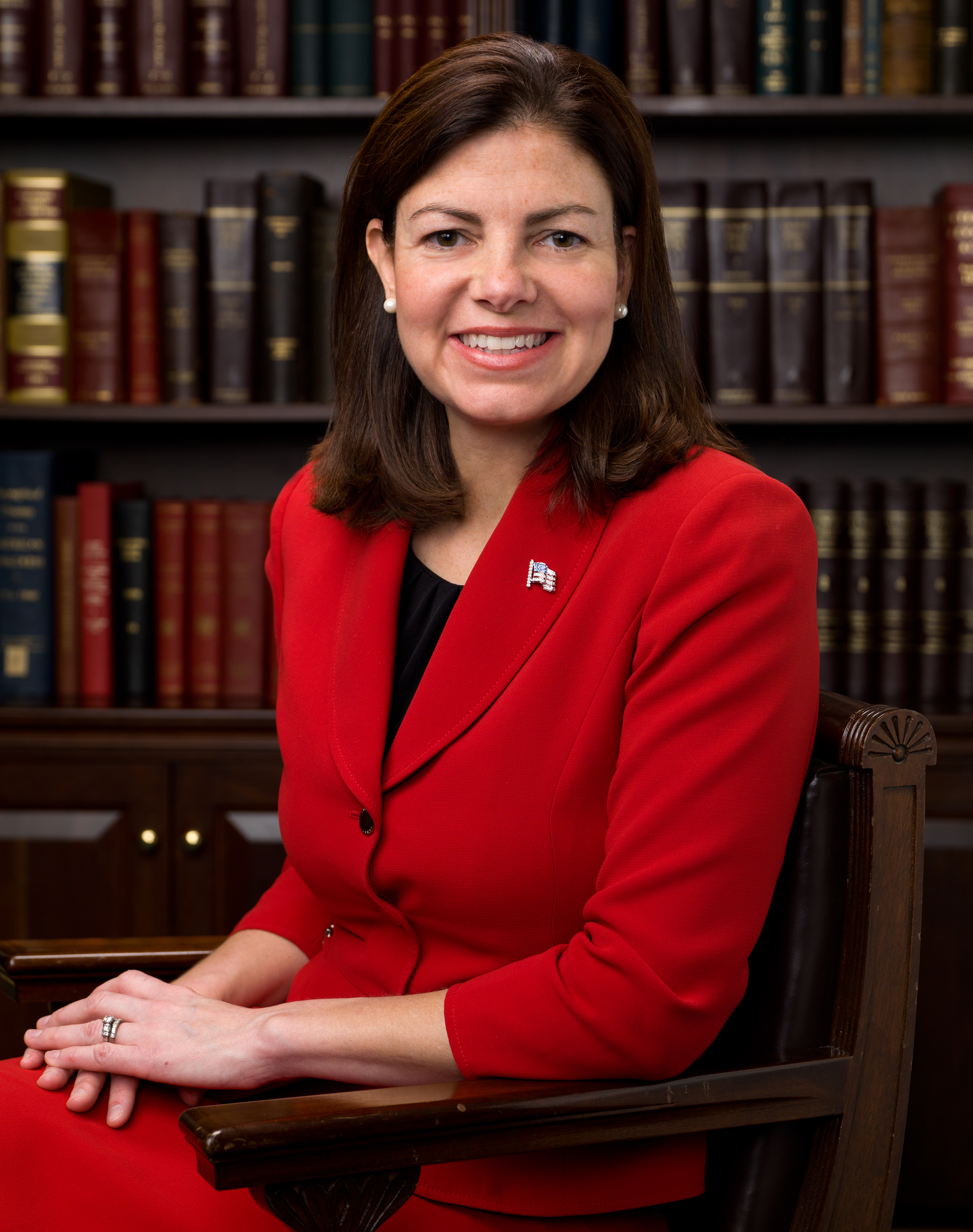
Kelly Ayotte

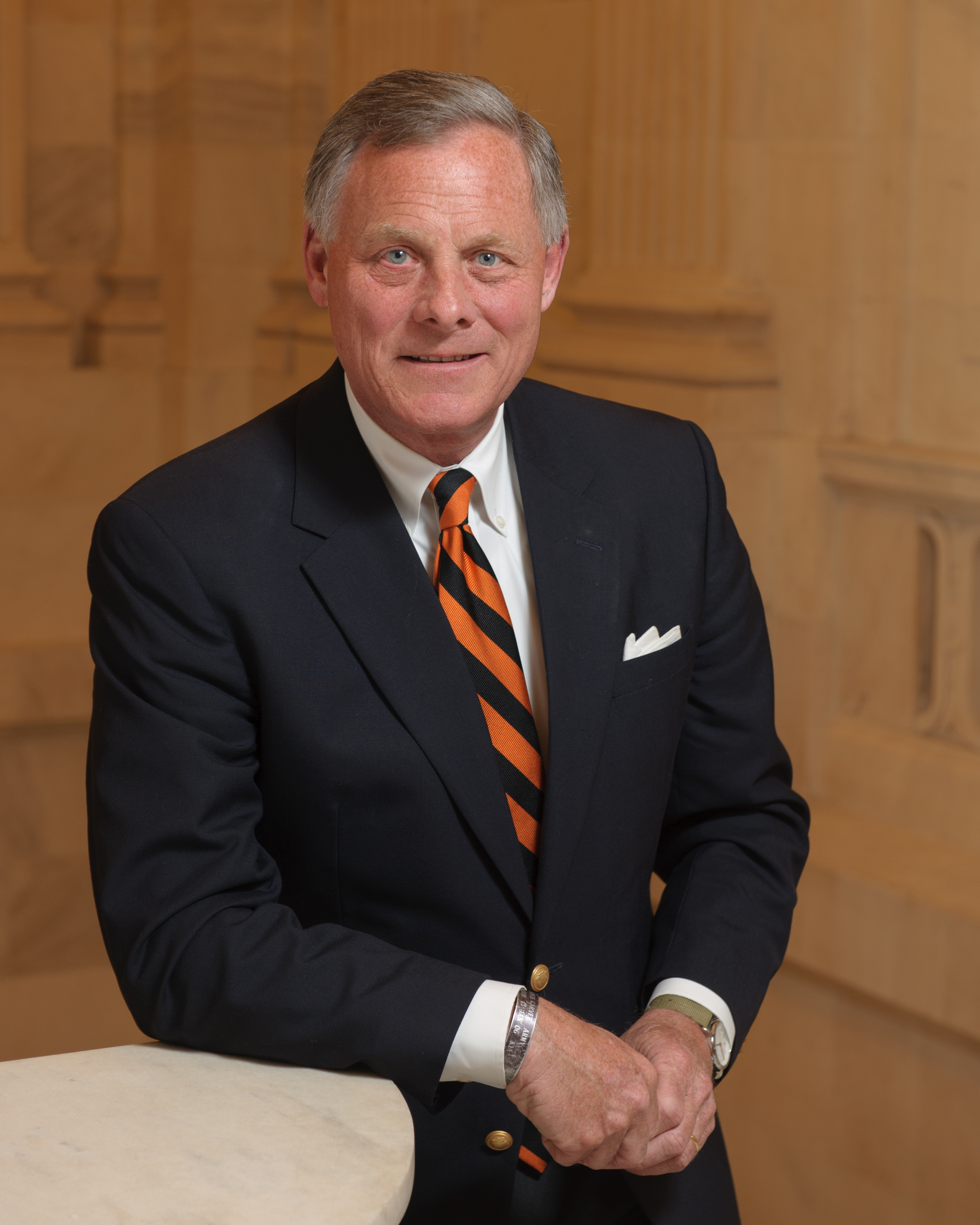
Richard Burr

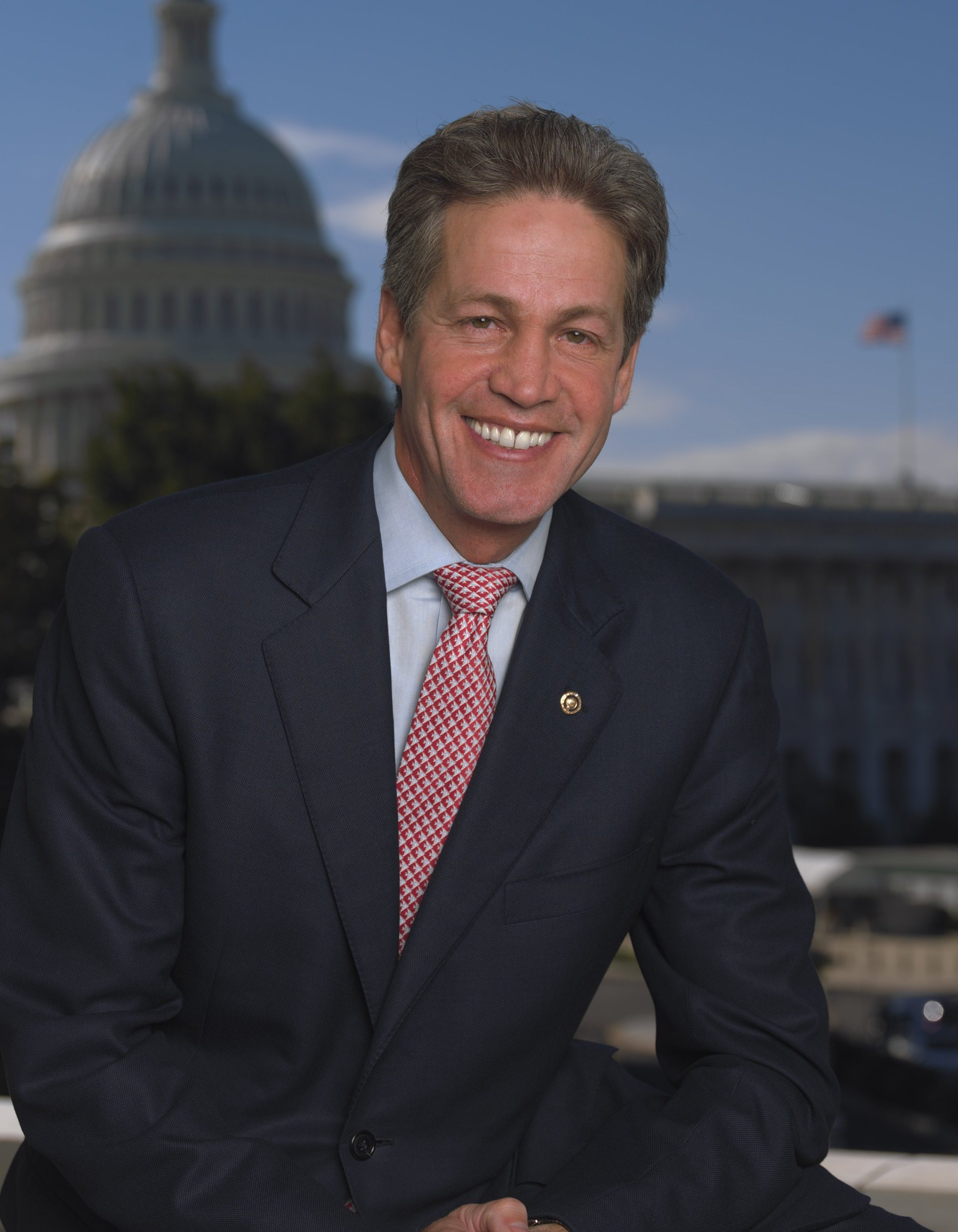
Norm Coleman

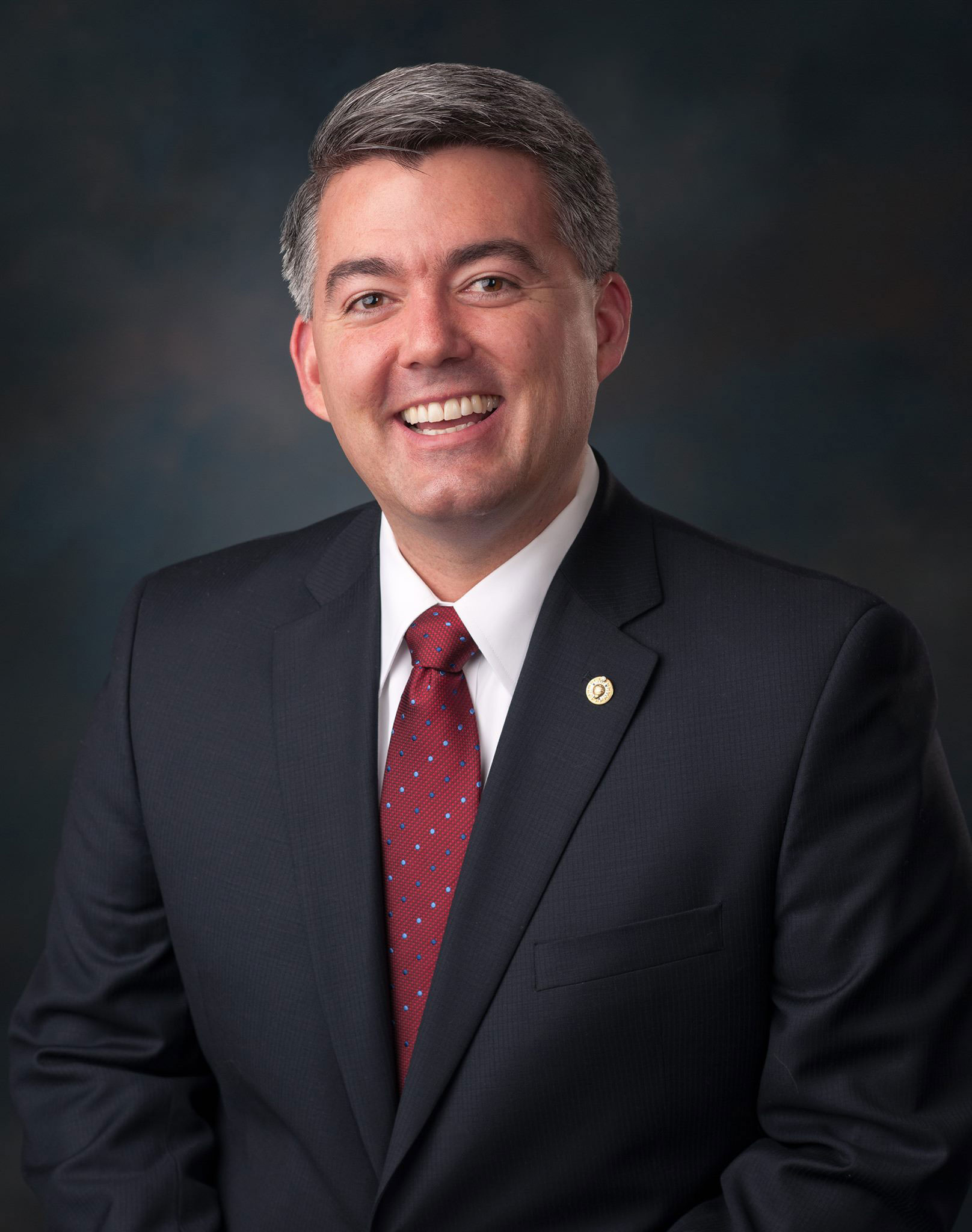
Cory Gardner

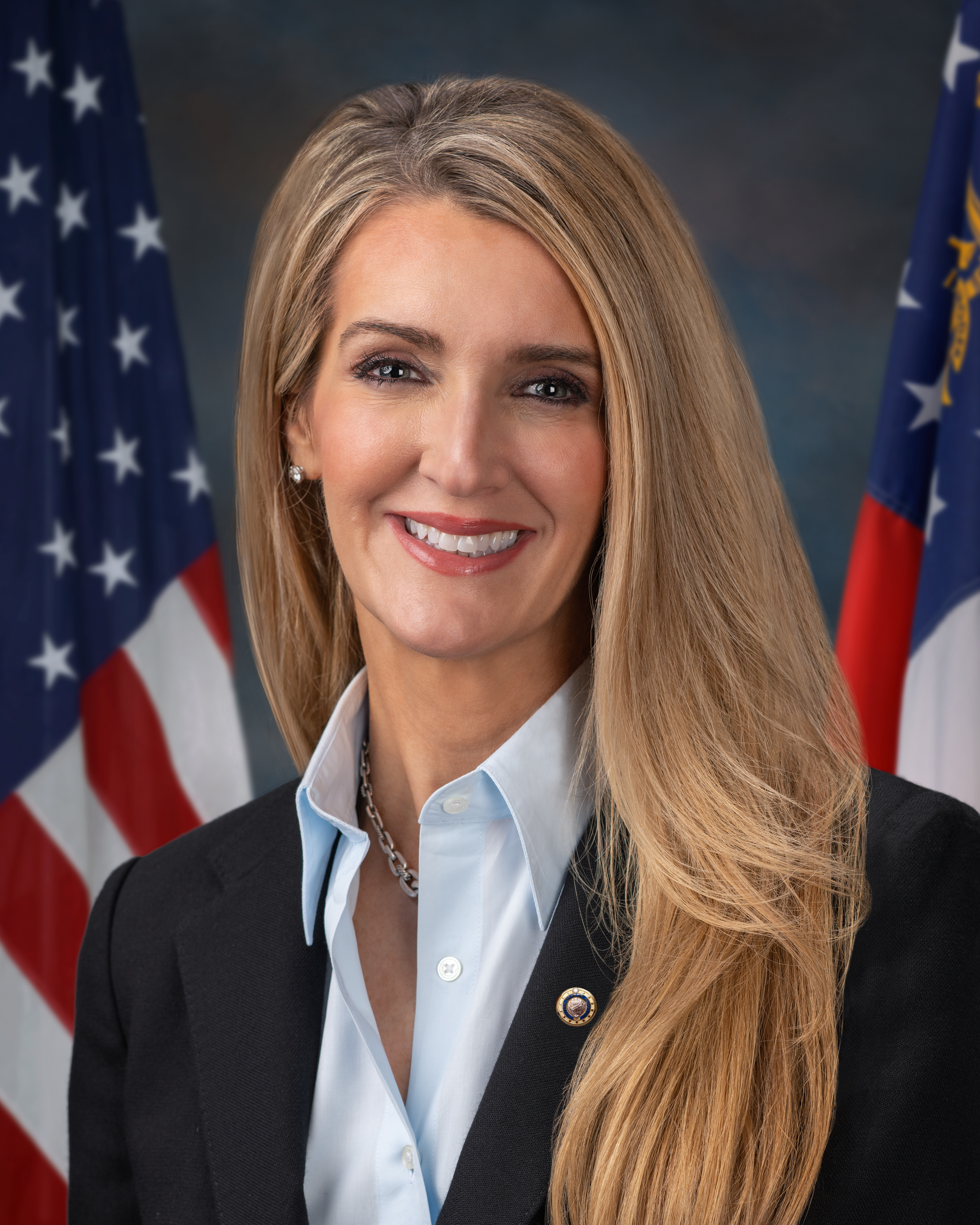
Kelly Loeffler

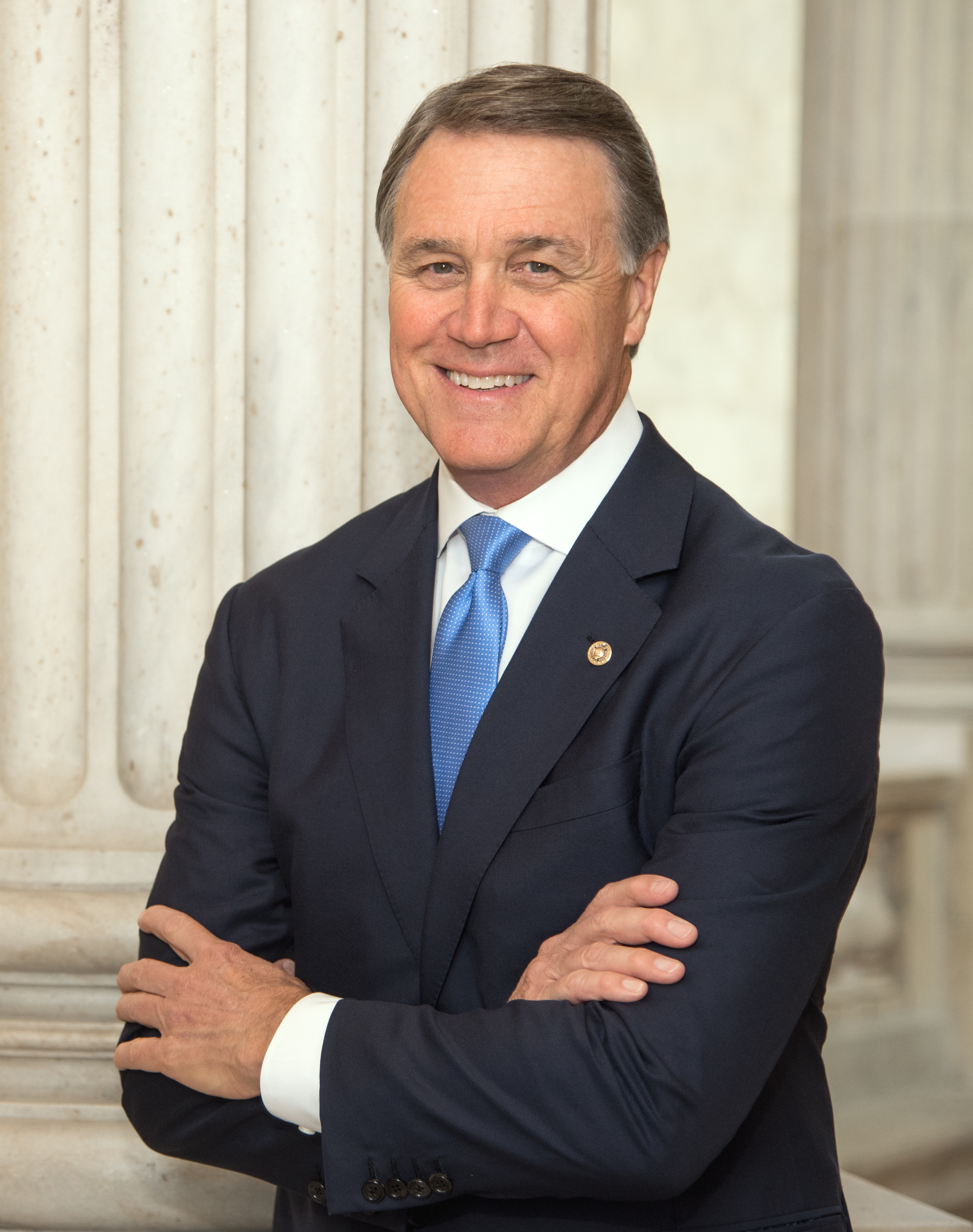
David Perdue

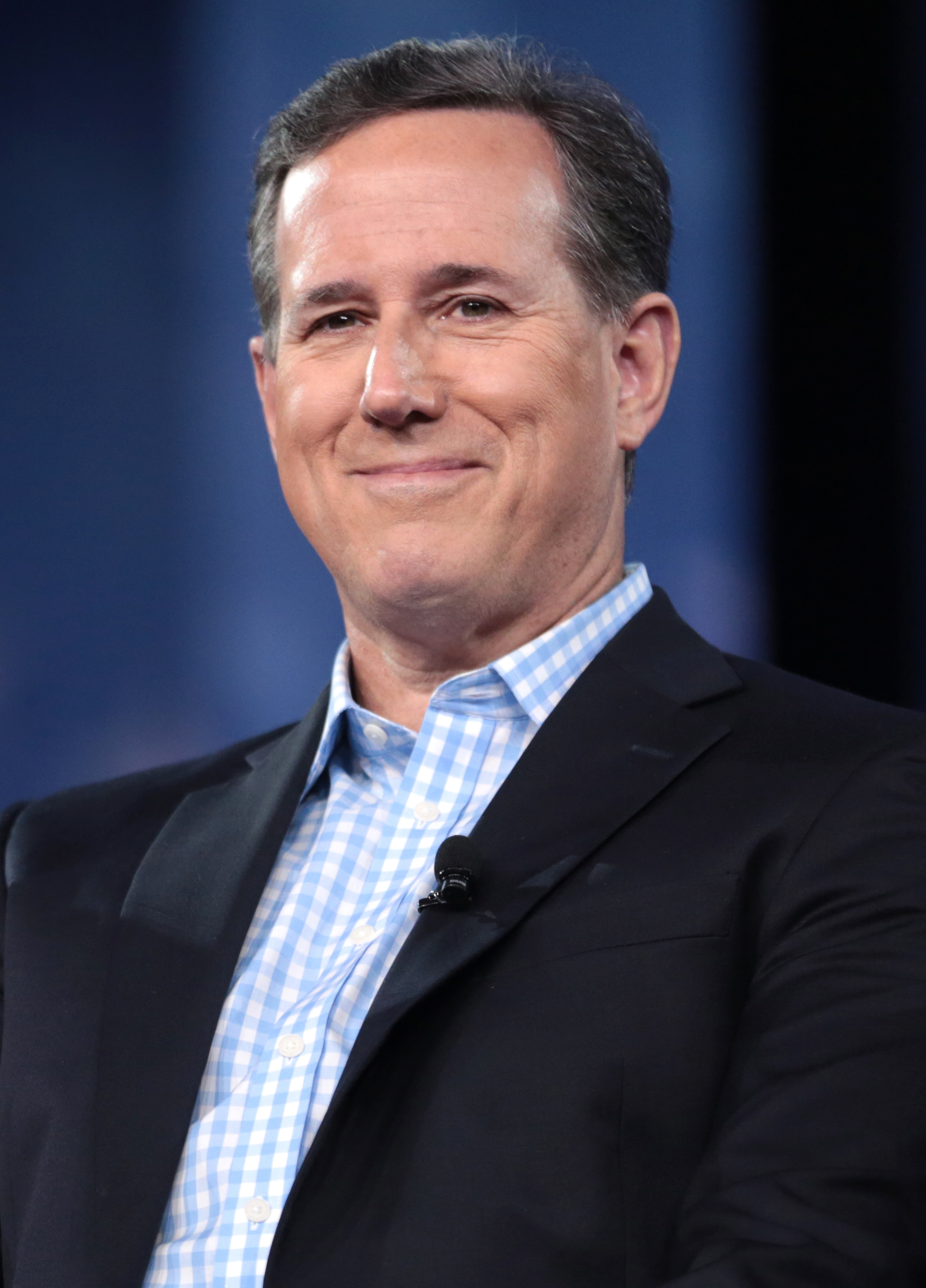
Rick Santorum

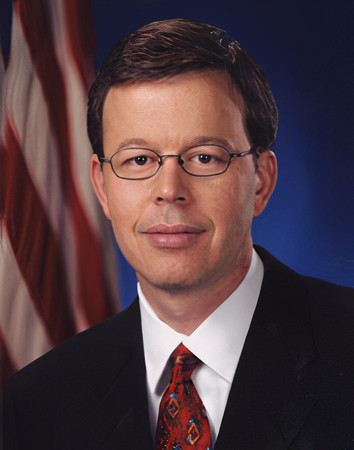
Jim Talent

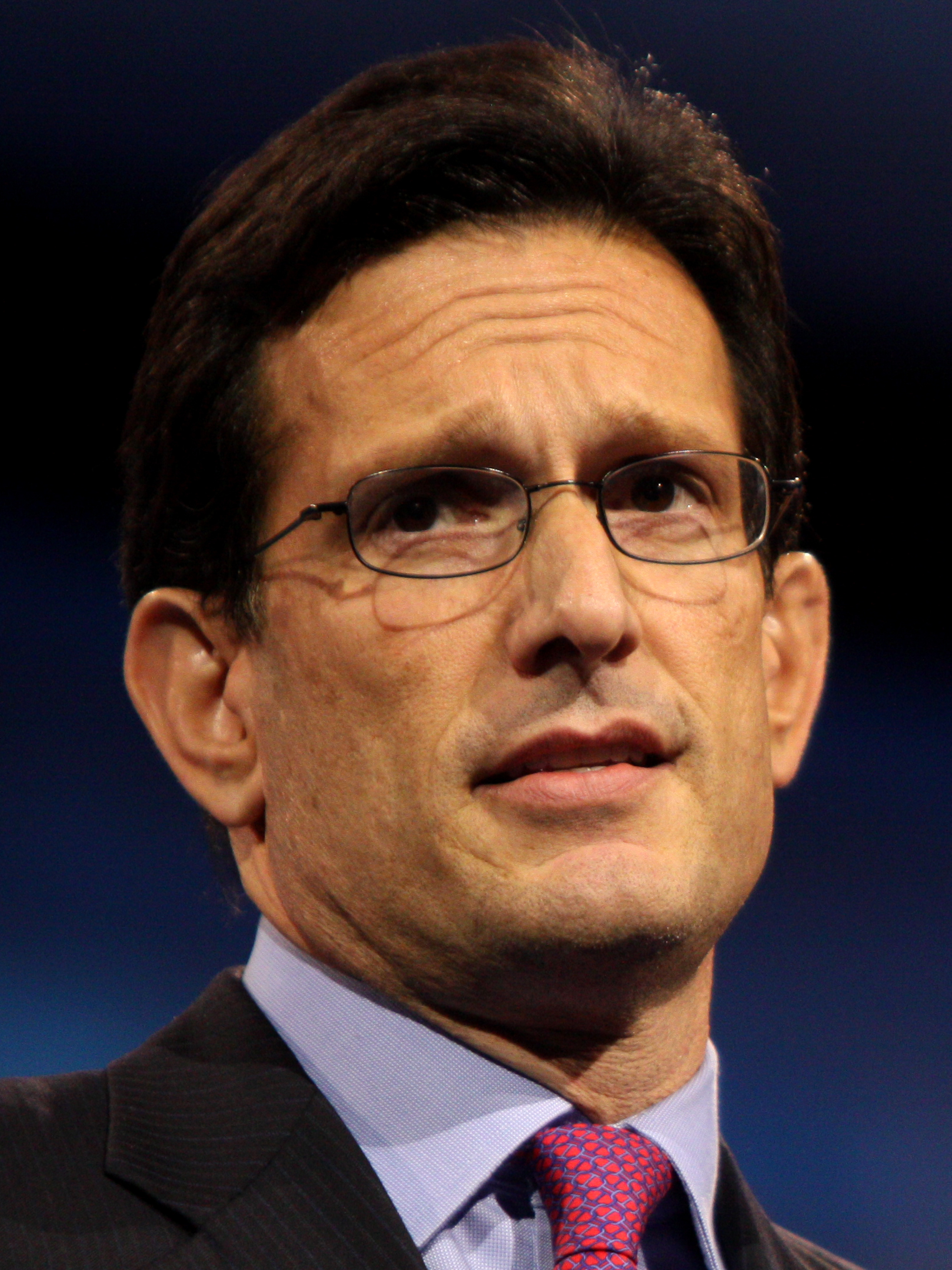
Eric Cantor

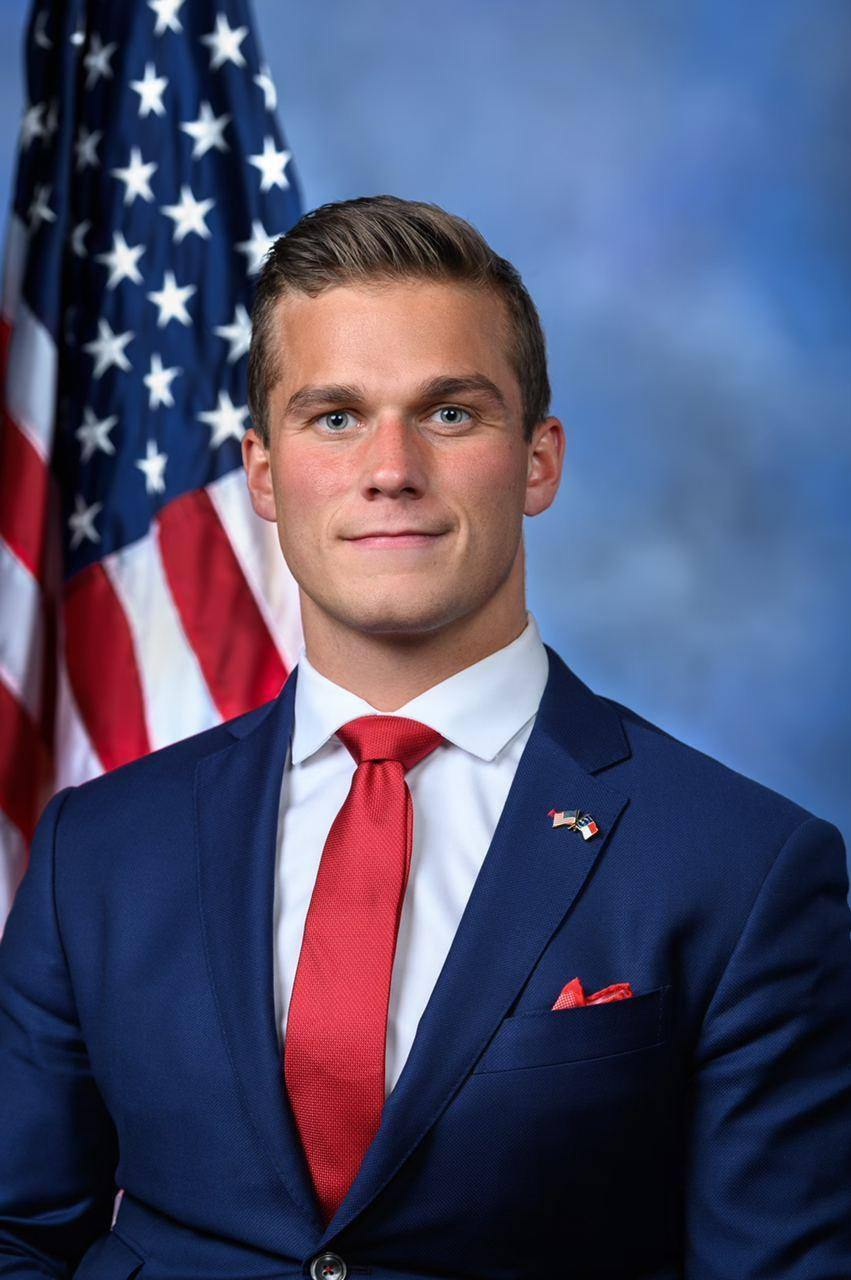
Madison Cawthorn

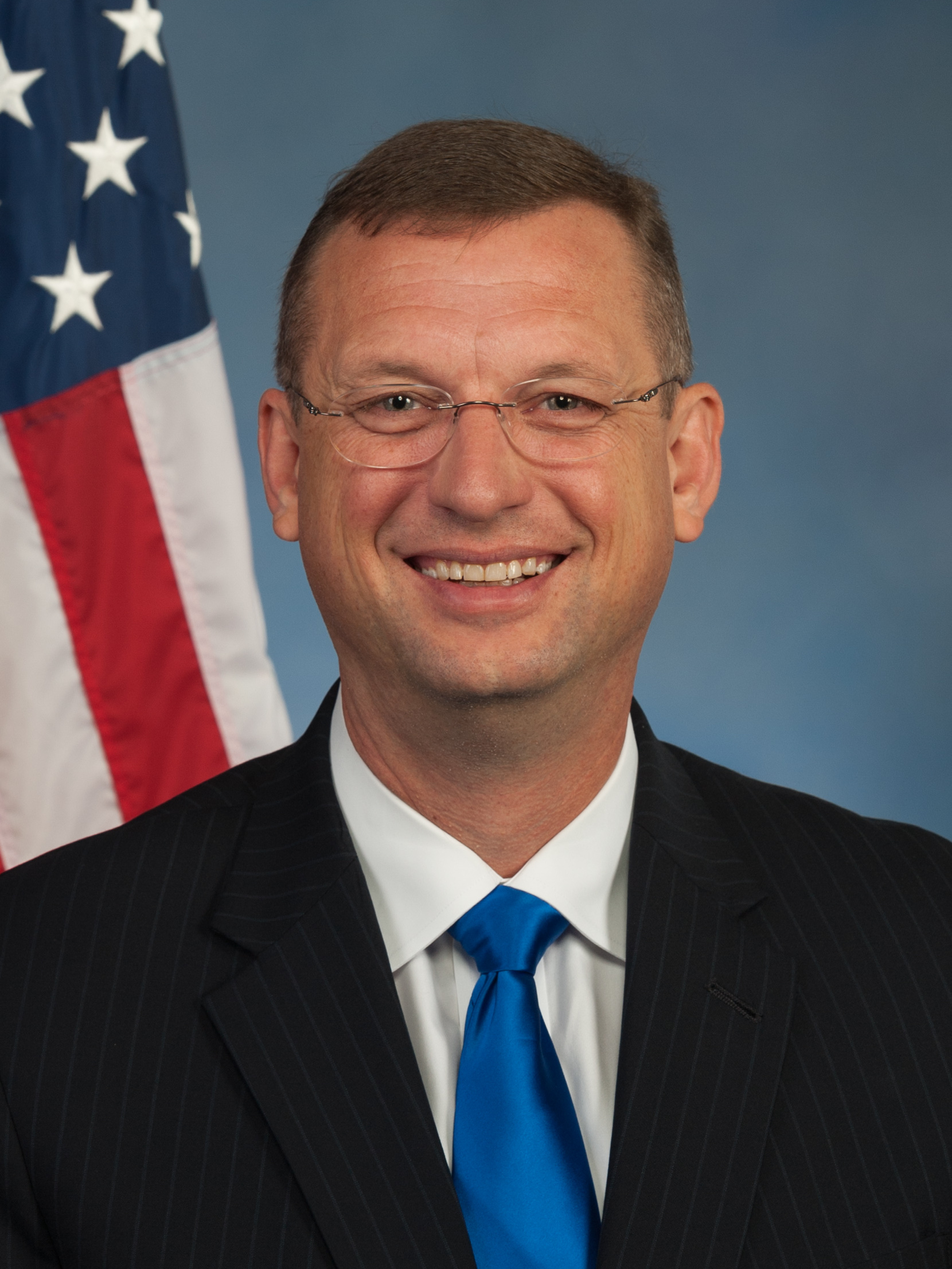
Doug Collins

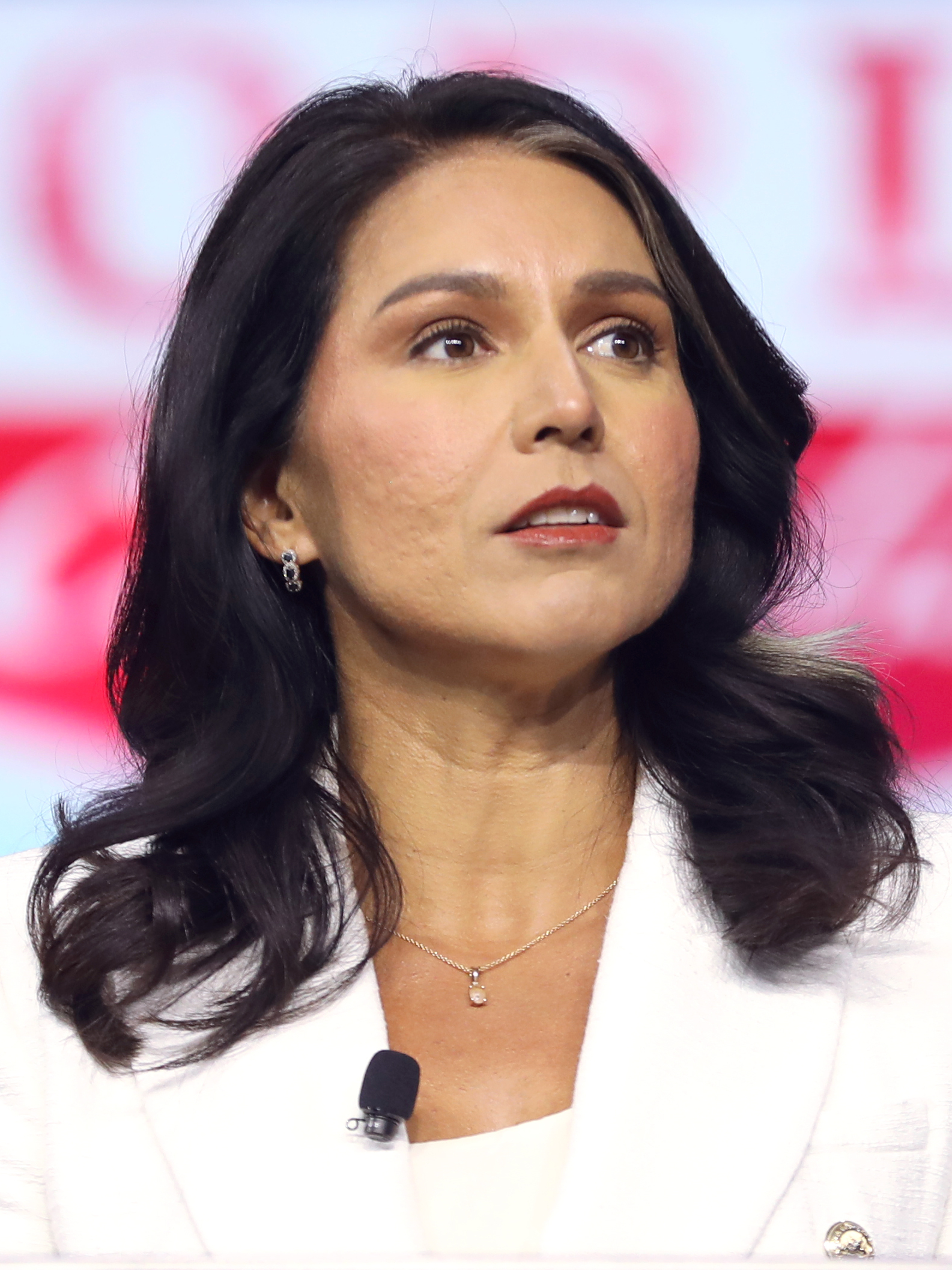
Tulsi Gabbard

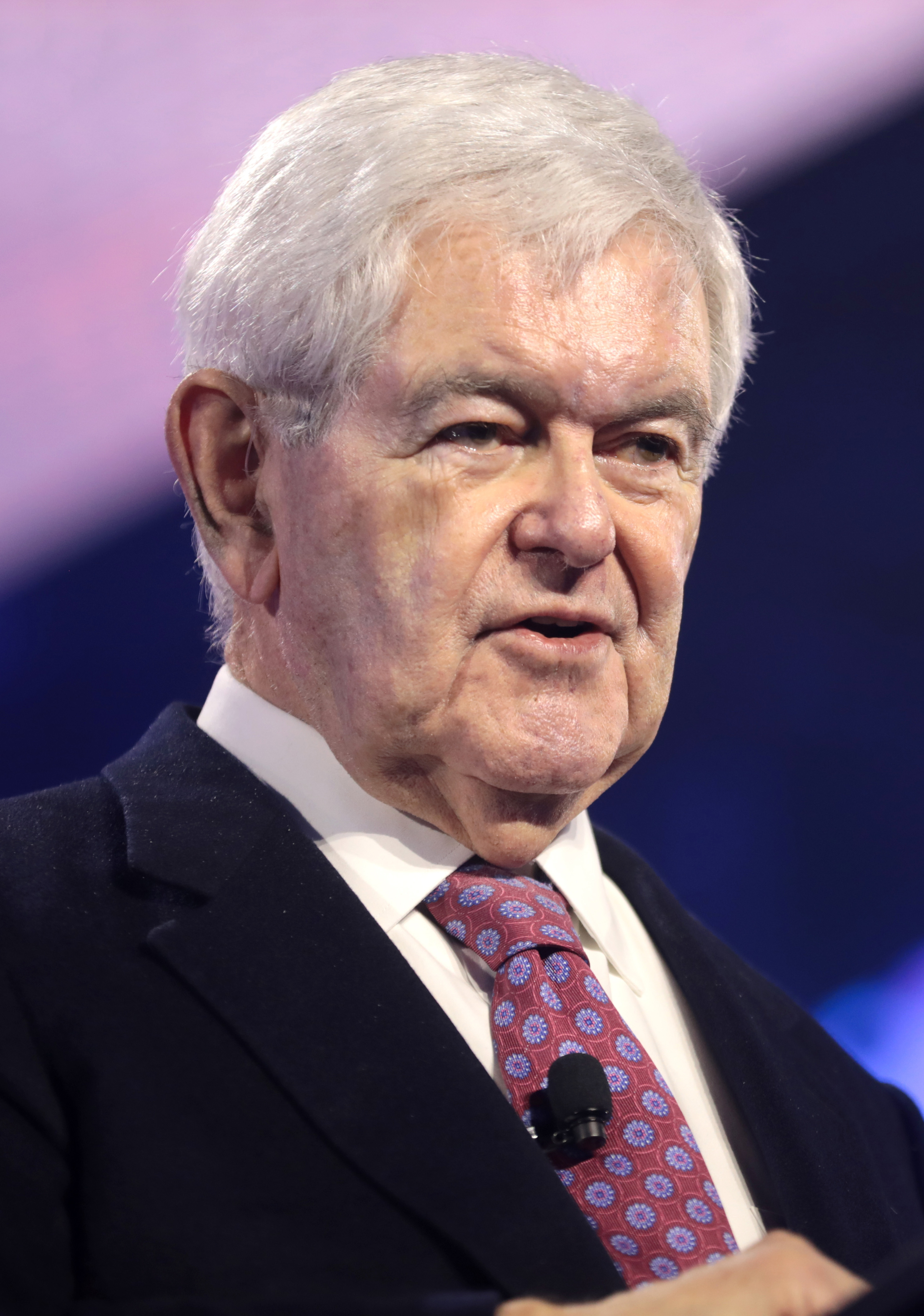
Newt Gingrich

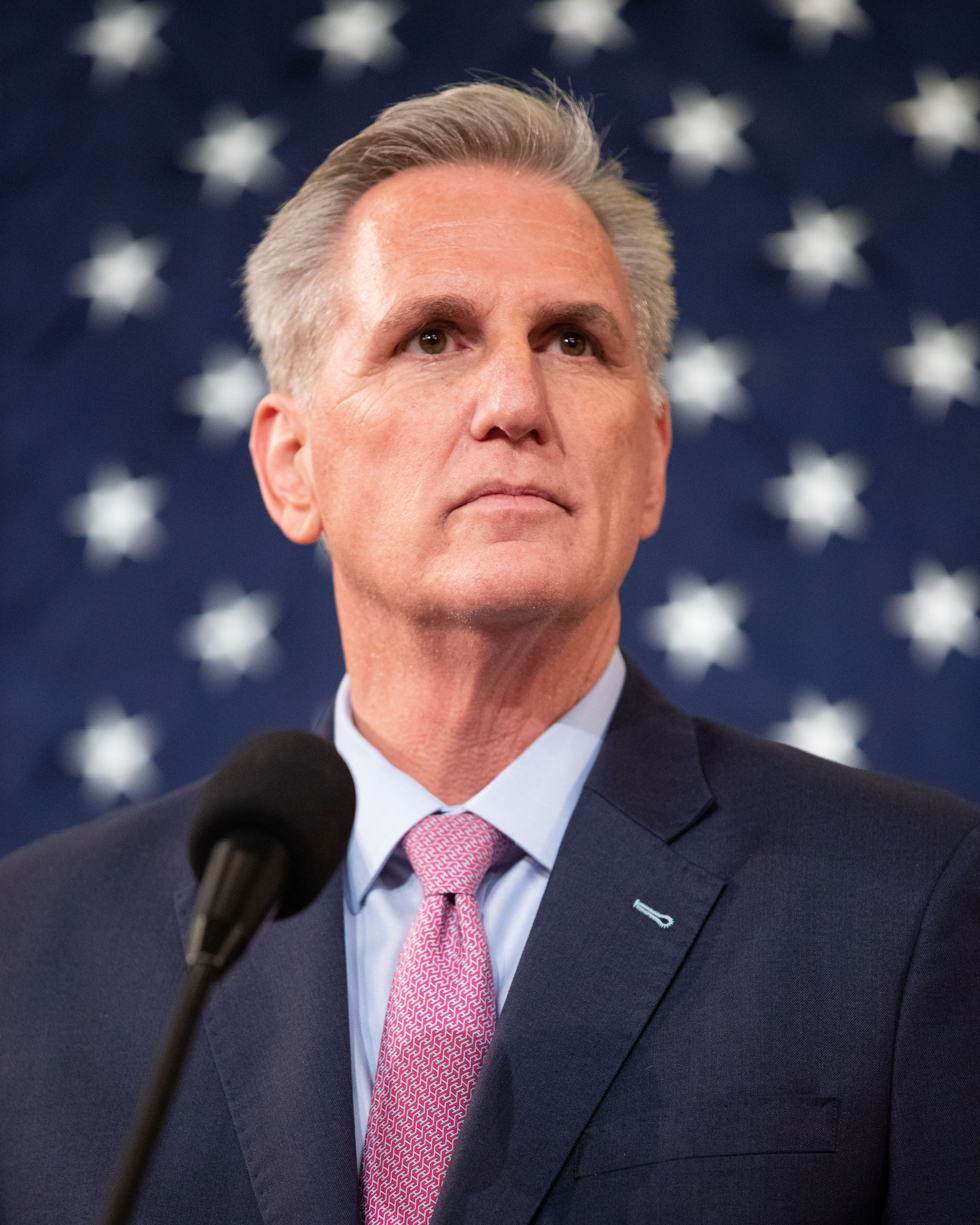
Kevin McCarthy

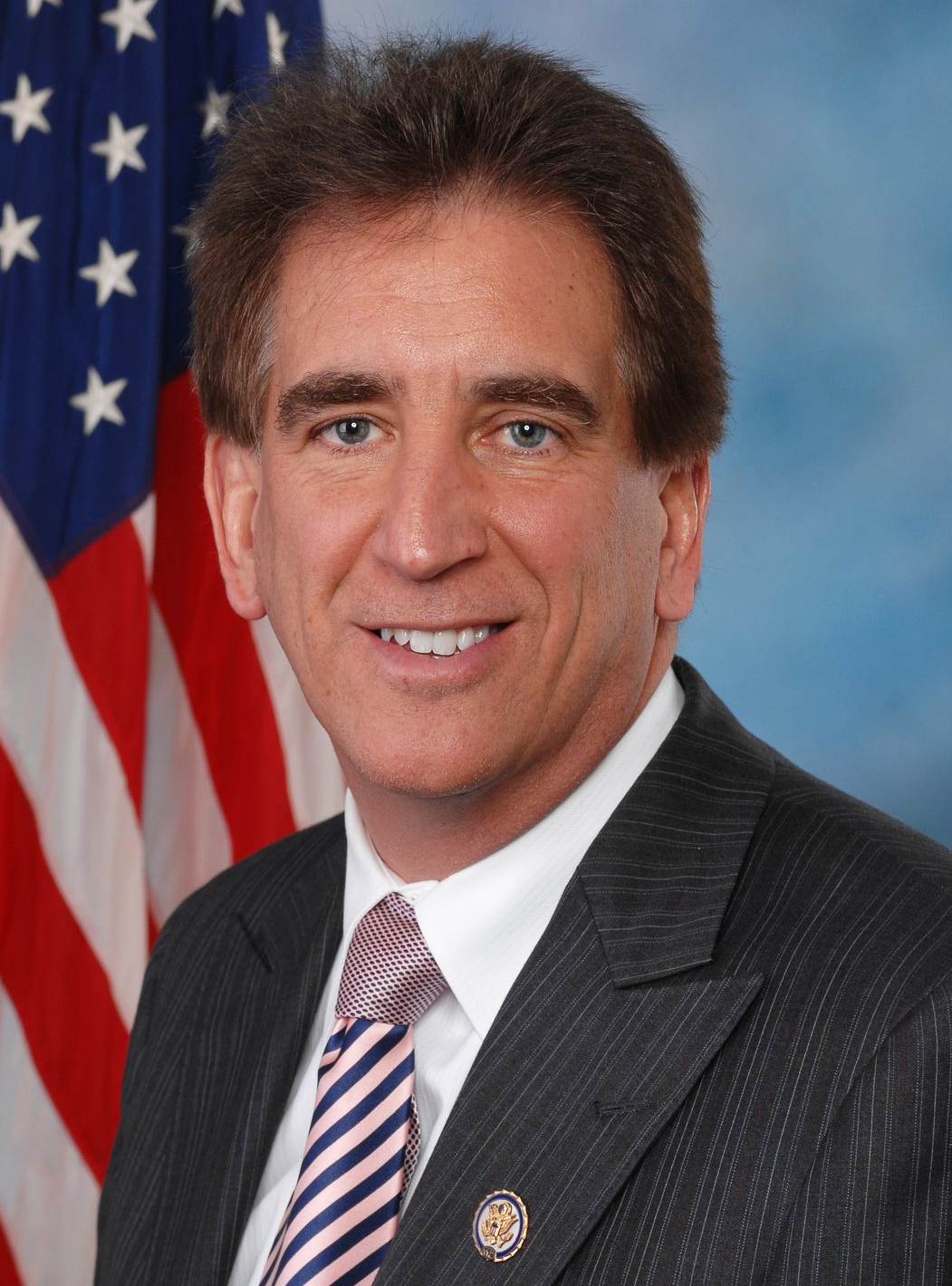
Jim Renacci

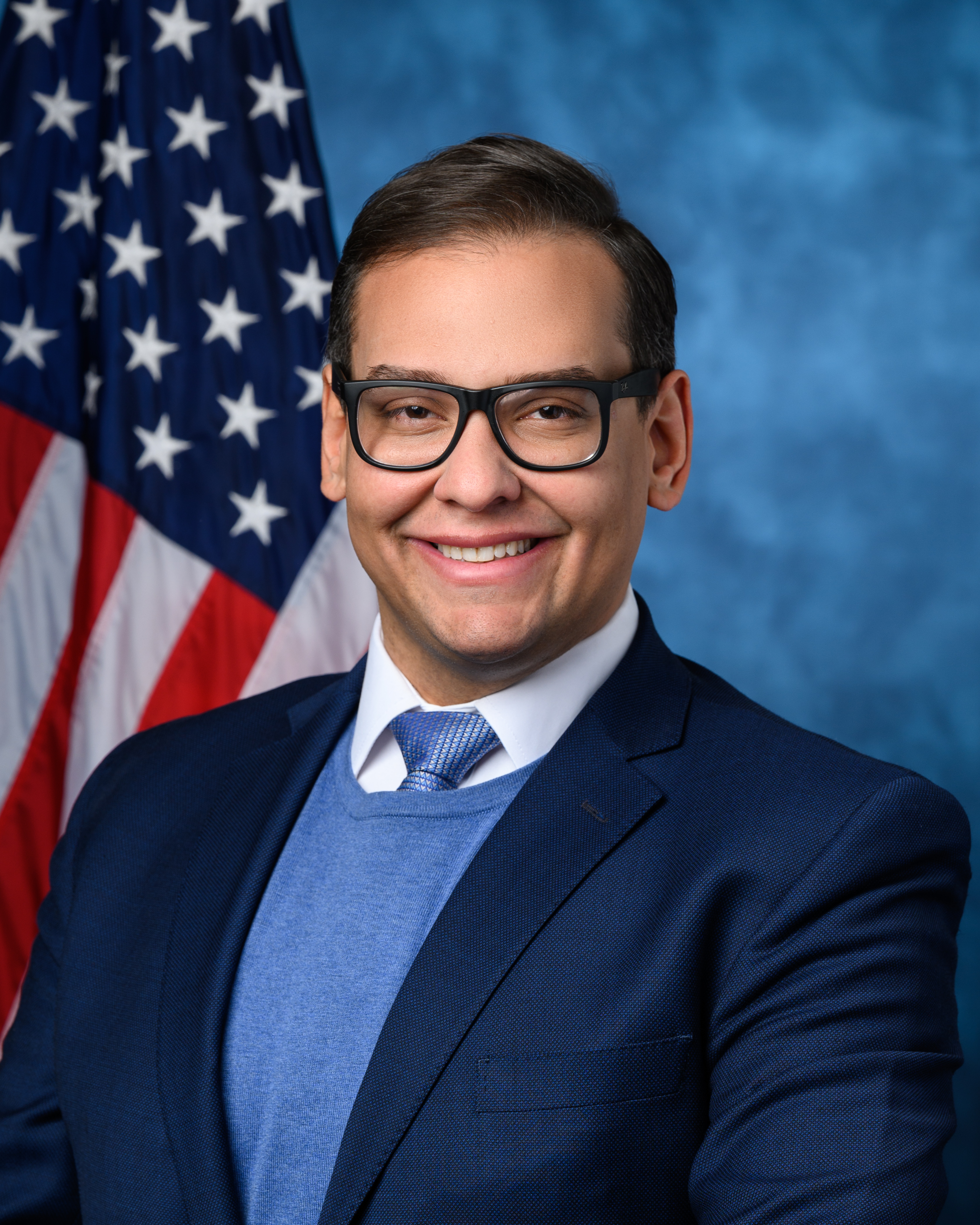
George Santos

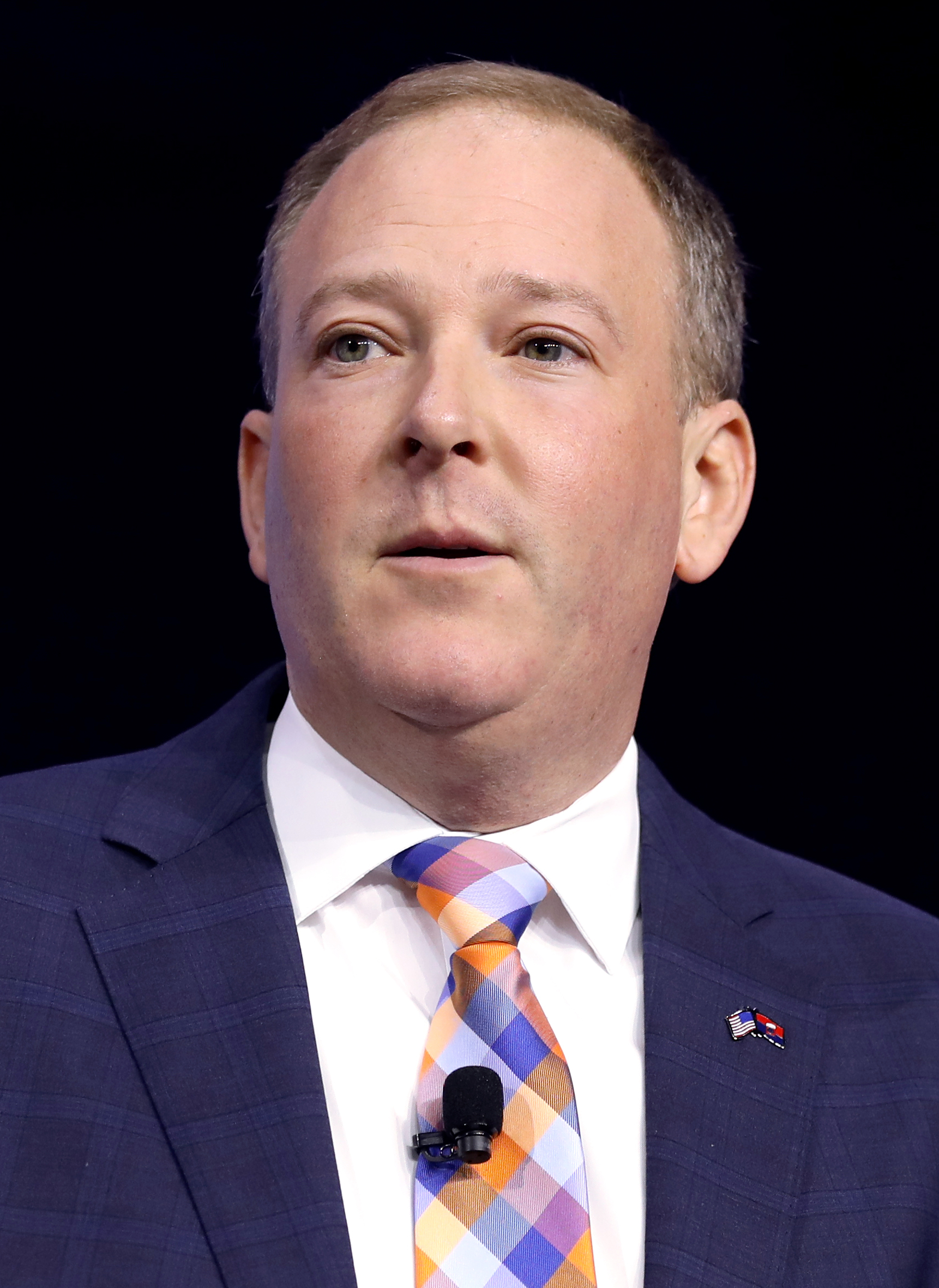
Lee Zeldin

=== Senators ===
- George Allen, United States Senator from Virginia (2001–2007) and 67th Governor of Virginia (1994–1998)
- Kelly Ayotte, United States Senator from New Hampshire (2011–2017)
- Richard Burr, Chair of the Senate Intelligence Committee (2015–2020)
- Norm Coleman, United States Senator from Minnesota (2003–2009)
- Al D'Amato, Chair of the Senate Banking Committee (1995–1999)
- Cory Gardner, United States Senator from Colorado (2015–2021)
- Kelly Loeffler, United States Senator from Georgia (2020–2021)
- David Perdue, United States Senator from Georgia (2015–2021)
- Rick Santorum, Chair of the Senate Republican Conference (2001–2007)
- Bob Smith, Chair of the Senate Environment Committee (1999–2001, 2001)
- Jim Talent, United States Senator from Missouri (2002–2007)

=== Shadow senators ===
- Zoraida Buxó, United States Shadow Senator from Puerto Rico (2021–2024)

=== Representatives ===
- Rod Blum, Member of the U.S. House of Representatives from Iowa's 1st district (2015–2019)
- Joseph Cao, Member of the U.S. House of Representatives from Louisiana's 2nd district (2009–2011)
- Eric Cantor, House Majority Leader (2011–2014), House Minority Whip (2009–2014) and House Republican Chief Deputy Whip (2003–2009)
- Madison Cawthorn, Member of the U.S. House of Representatives from North Carolina's 11th district (2021–2023)
- Chris Collins, Member of the U.S. House of Representatives from New York's 27th district (2013–2019)
- Doug Collins, Member of the U.S. House of Representatives from Georgia's 9th district (2013–2021)
- Connie Conway, Member of the U.S. House of Representatives from California's 22nd district (2022–2023)
- Rodney Davis, Ranking Member of the House Administration Committee (2019–2023)
- Peter Deutsch, Member of the U.S. House of Representatives from Florida's 20th district (1993–2005) (Democratic)
- Jimmy Duncan, Member of the U.S. House of Representatives from Tennessee's 2nd district (1988–2019)
- Sean Duffy, Member of the U.S. House of Representatives from Wisconsin's 7th district (2011–2019)
- Mayra Flores, Member of the U.S. House of Representatives from Texas's 34th district (2022–2023)
- Tulsi Gabbard, Member of the U.S. House of Representatives from Hawaii's 2nd district (2013–2021)
- Greg Ganske, Member of the U.S. House of Representatives from Iowa's 4th district (1995–2003)
- Newt Gingrich, 50th Speaker of the United States House of Representatives (1995–1999) and Leader of the House Republican Conference (1995–1999)
- Louie Gohmert, Member of the U.S. House of Representatives from Texas's 1st district (2005–2023)
- Trey Gowdy, Chair of the House Oversight Committee (2017–2019)
- Yvette Herrell, Member of the U.S. House of Representatives from New Mexico's 2nd district (2021–2023)
- Jody Hice, Member of the U.S. House of Representatives from Georgia's 10th district (2015–2023)
- Tim Huelskamp, Member of the U.S. House of Representatives from Kansas's 1st district (2011–2017)
- Fred Keller, Member of the U.S. House of Representatives from Pennsylvania's 12th district (2019–2023)
- Peter King, Chair of the House Homeland Security Committee (2005–2007, 2011–2013)
- Jack Kingston, Vice Chair of the House Republican Conference (2003–2007)
- Jason Lewis, Member of the U.S. House of Representatives from Minnesota's 2nd district (2017–2019)
- Bob Livingston, Chair of the House Appropriations Committee (1995–1999)
- Billy Long, Member of the U.S. House of Representatives from Missouri's 7th district (2011–2023)
- Kevin McCarthy, 55th Speaker of the United States House of Representatives (2023) and Member of the U.S. House of Representatives from California (2007–2023)
- Bob McEwen, Member of the U.S. House of Representatives from Ohio's 6th district (1981–1993)
- David McIntosh, Member of the U.S. House of Representatives from Indiana's 2nd district (1995–2001) and Director of the Domestic Policy Council (1987–1988)
- Bruce Poliquin, Member of the U.S. House of Representatives from Maine's 2nd district (2015–2019)
- Trey Radel, Member of the U.S. House of Representatives from Florida's 19th district (2013–2014)
- Denny Rehberg, Member of the U.S. House of Representatives from Montana's at-large district (2001–2013)
- Jim Renacci, Member of the U.S. House of Representatives from Ohio's 16th district (2011–2019)
- David Rivera, Member of the U.S. House of Representatives from Florida's 25th district (2011–2013)
- Mike Rogers, Chair of the House Intelligence Committee (2011–2015)
- George Santos, Member of the U.S. House of Representatives from New York's 3rd district (2023) (Independent)
- Aaron Schock, Member of the U.S. House of Representatives from Illinois's 18th district (2009–2015)
- Andrea Seastrand, Member of the U.S. House of Representatives from California's 22nd district (1995–1997)
- Chris Stewart, Member of the U.S. House of Representatives from Utah's 2nd district (2013–2023)
- Marlin Stutzman, Member of the U.S. House of Representatives from Indiana's 3rd district (2010–2017)
- Scott Taylor, Member of the U.S. House of Representatives from Virginia's 2nd district (2017–2019)
- Bob Walker, Chair of the House Science Committee (1995–1997)
- Mark Walker, Vice Chair of the House Republican Conference (2019–2021)
- Dave Weldon, Member of the U.S. House of Representatives from Florida's 15th district (1995–2009)
- Ted Yoho, Member of the U.S. House of Representatives from Florida's 3rd district (2013–2021)
- Lee Zeldin, Member of the U.S. House of Representatives from New York's 1st district (2015–2023)

== Statewide Officials ==
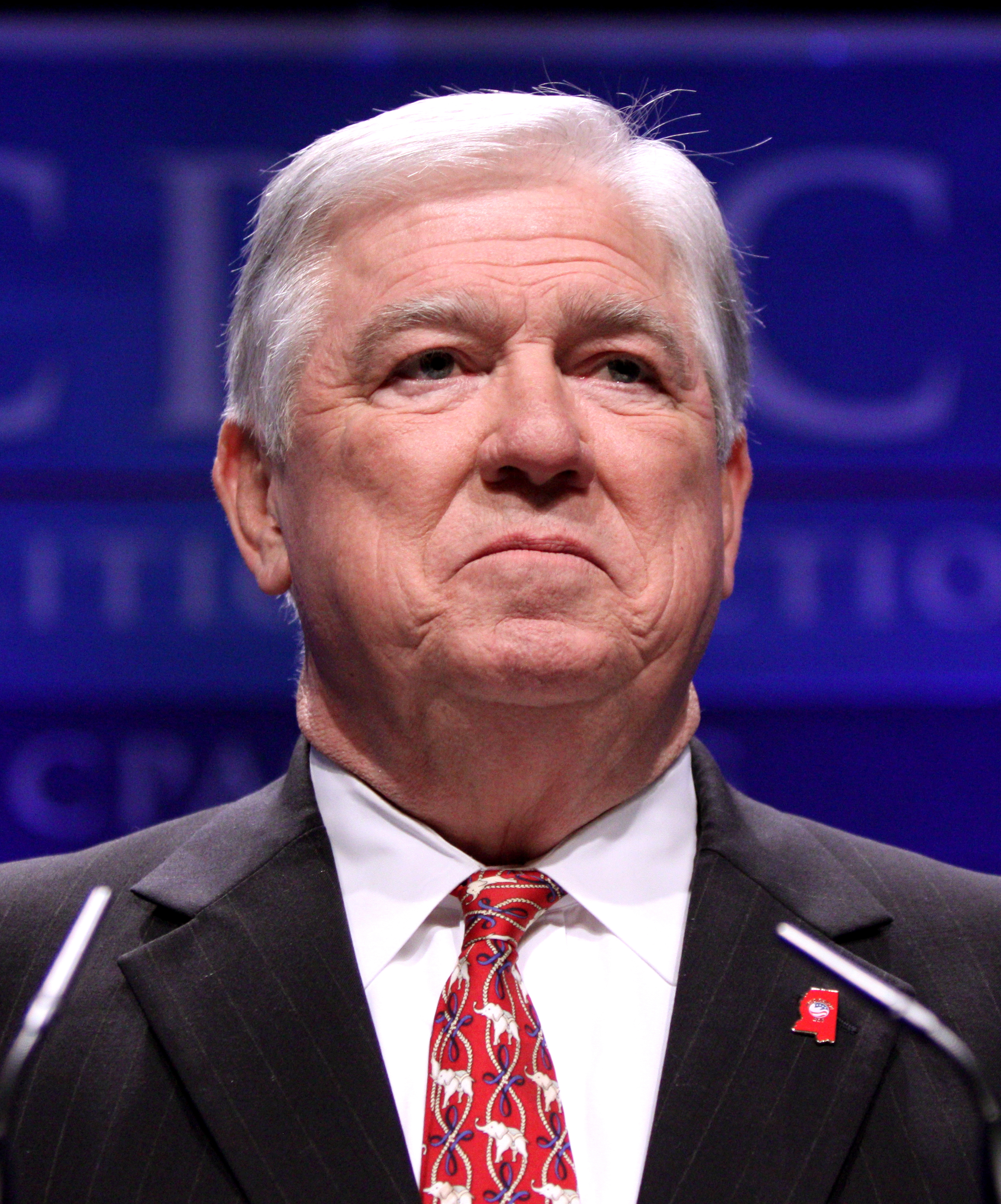
Haley Barbour

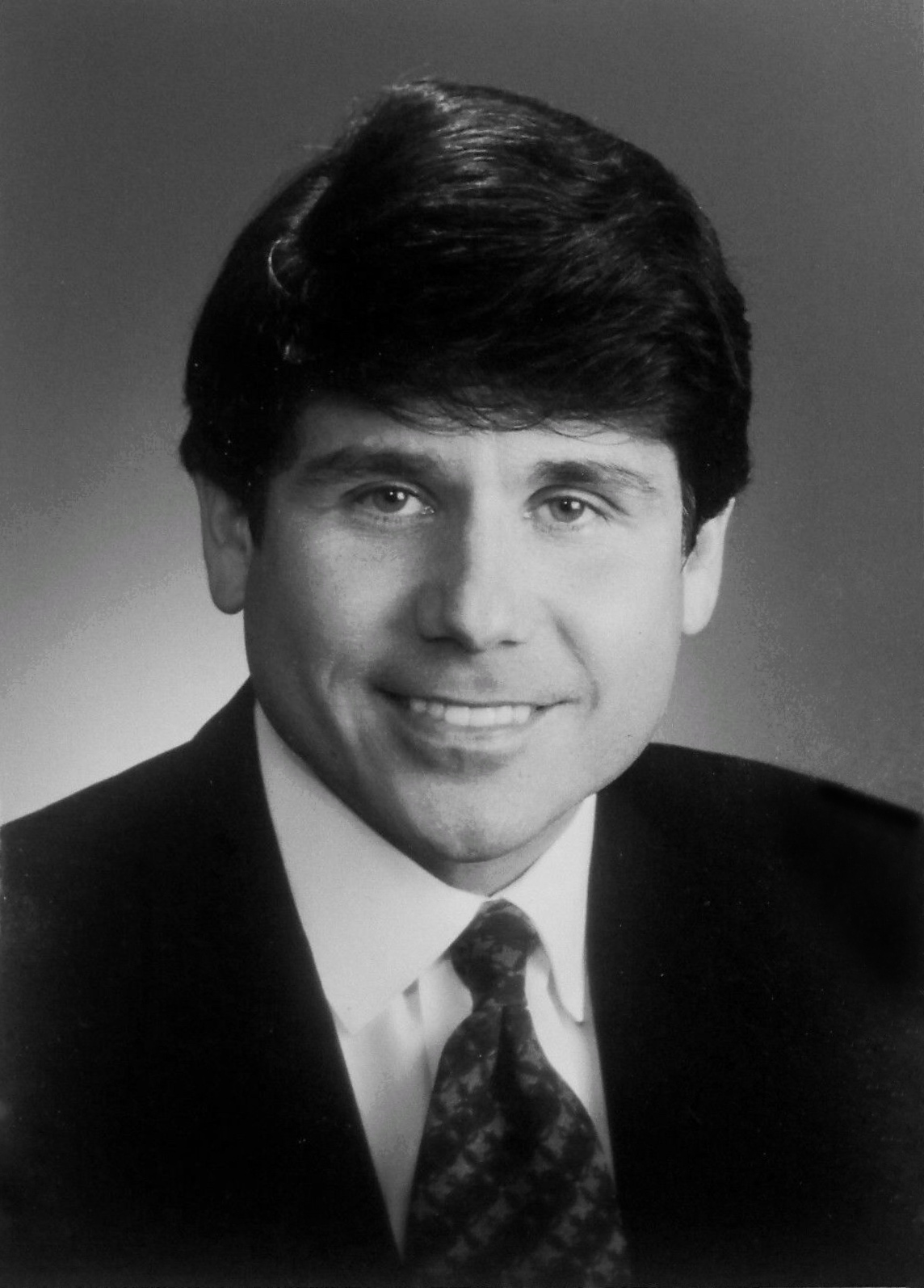
Rod Blagojevich

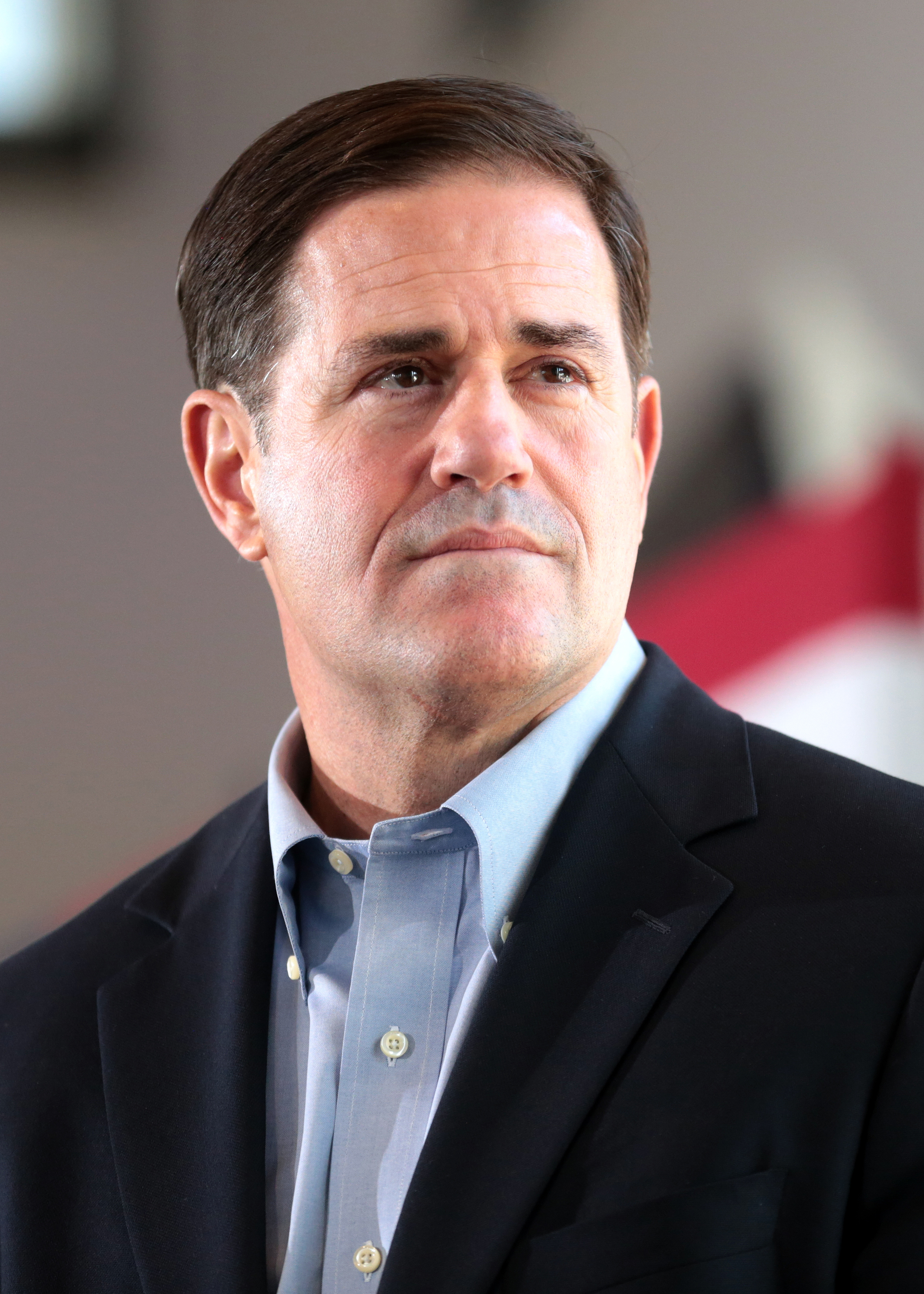
Doug Ducey

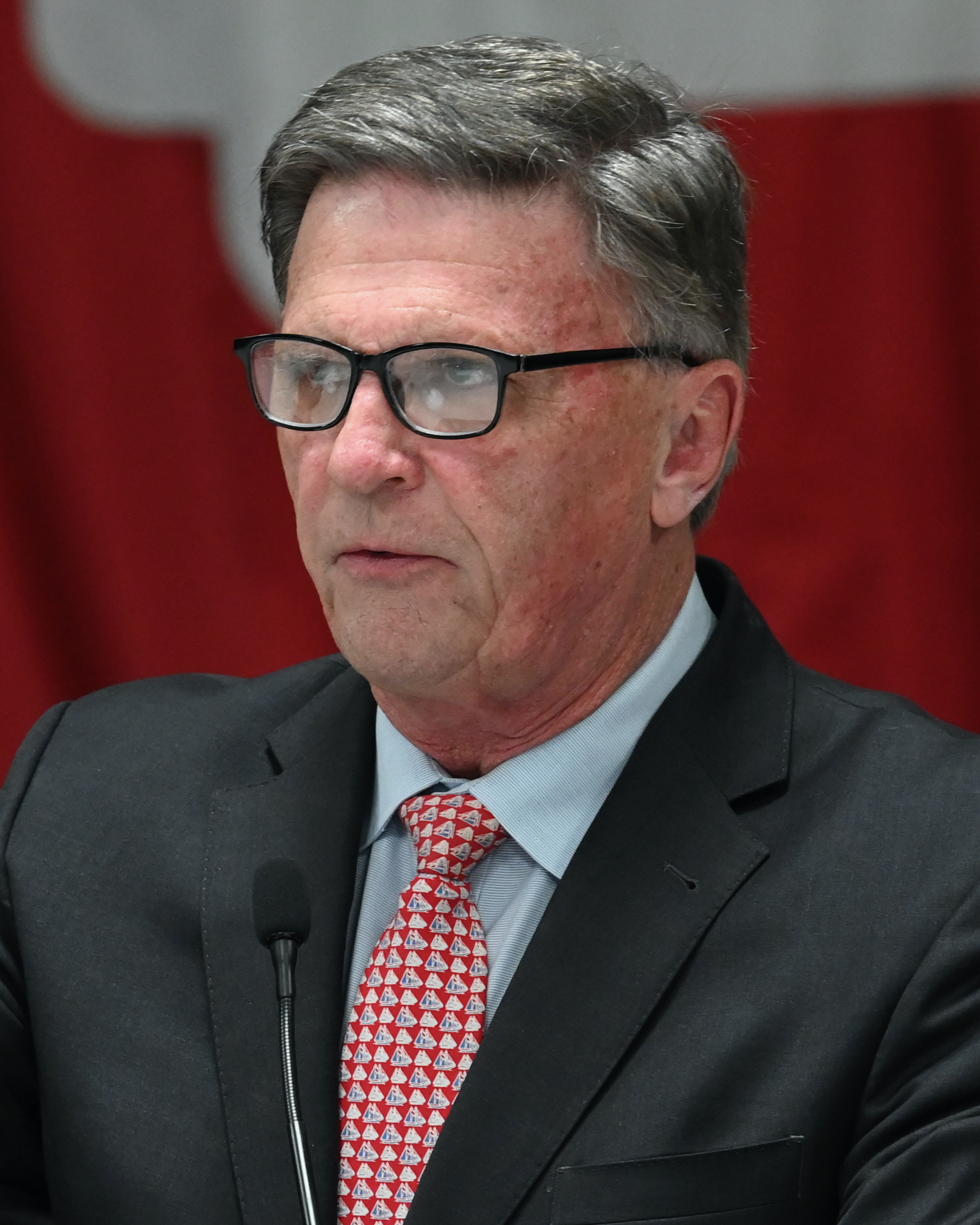
Bob Ehrlich

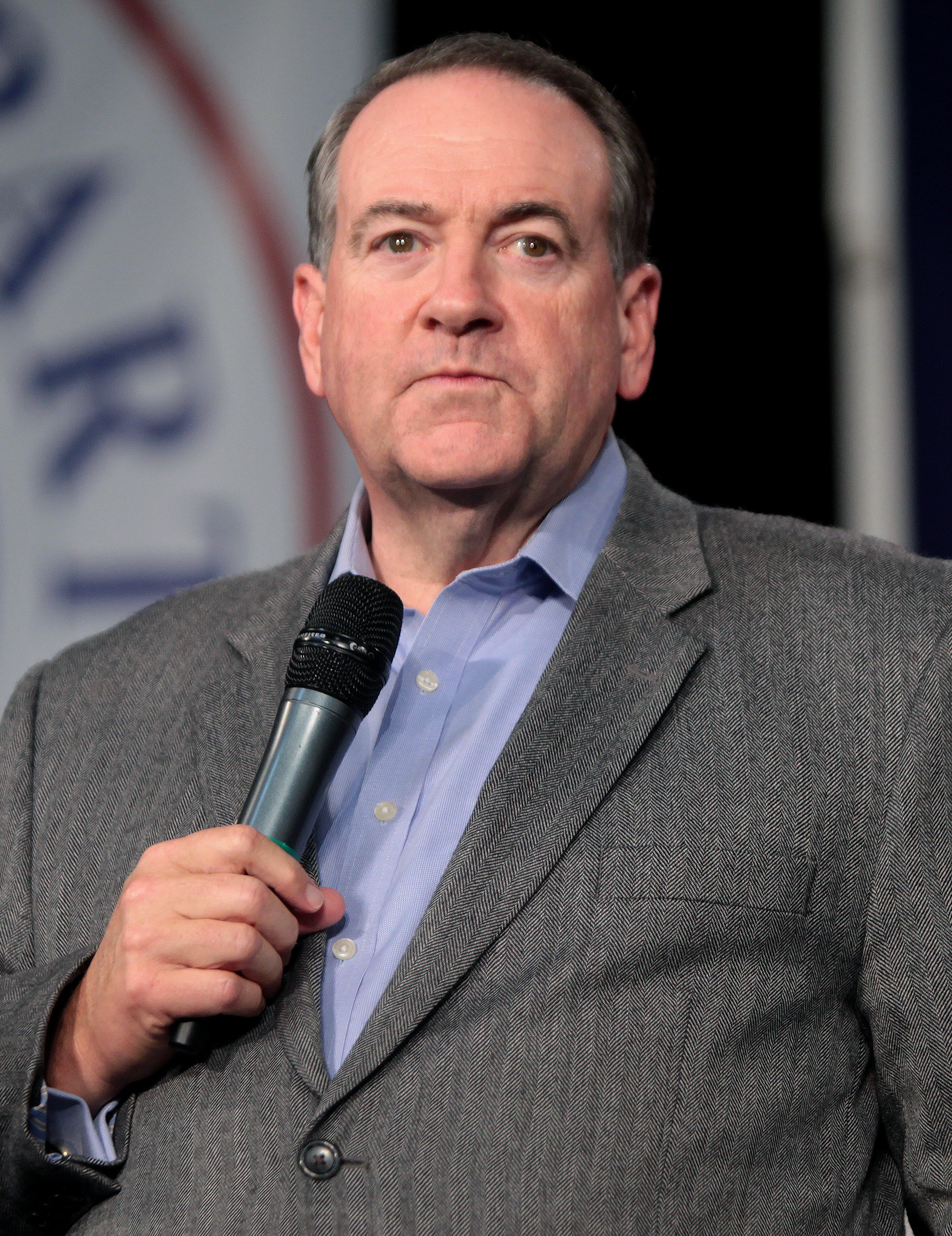
Mike Huckabee

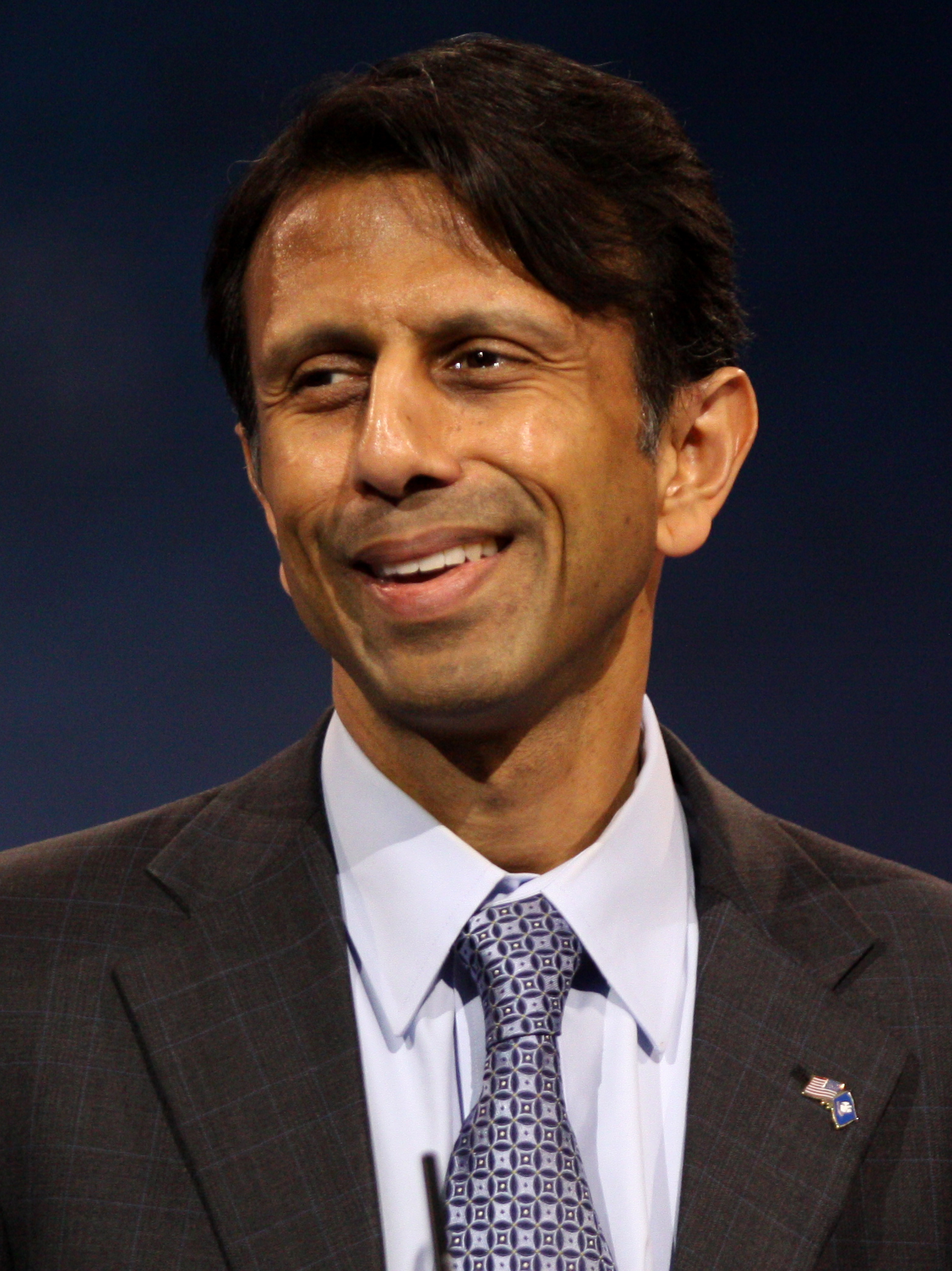
Bobby Jindal

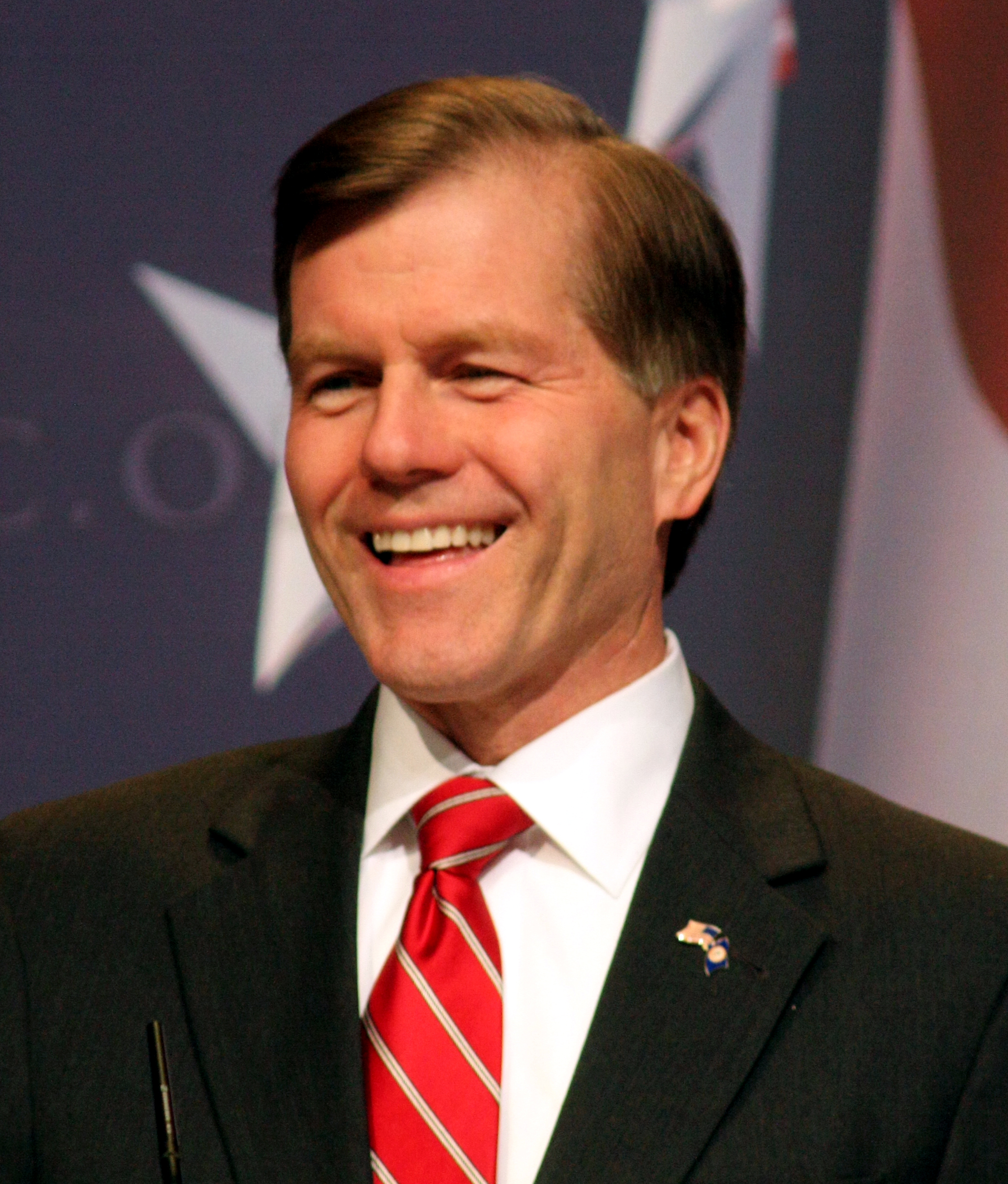
Bob McDonnell

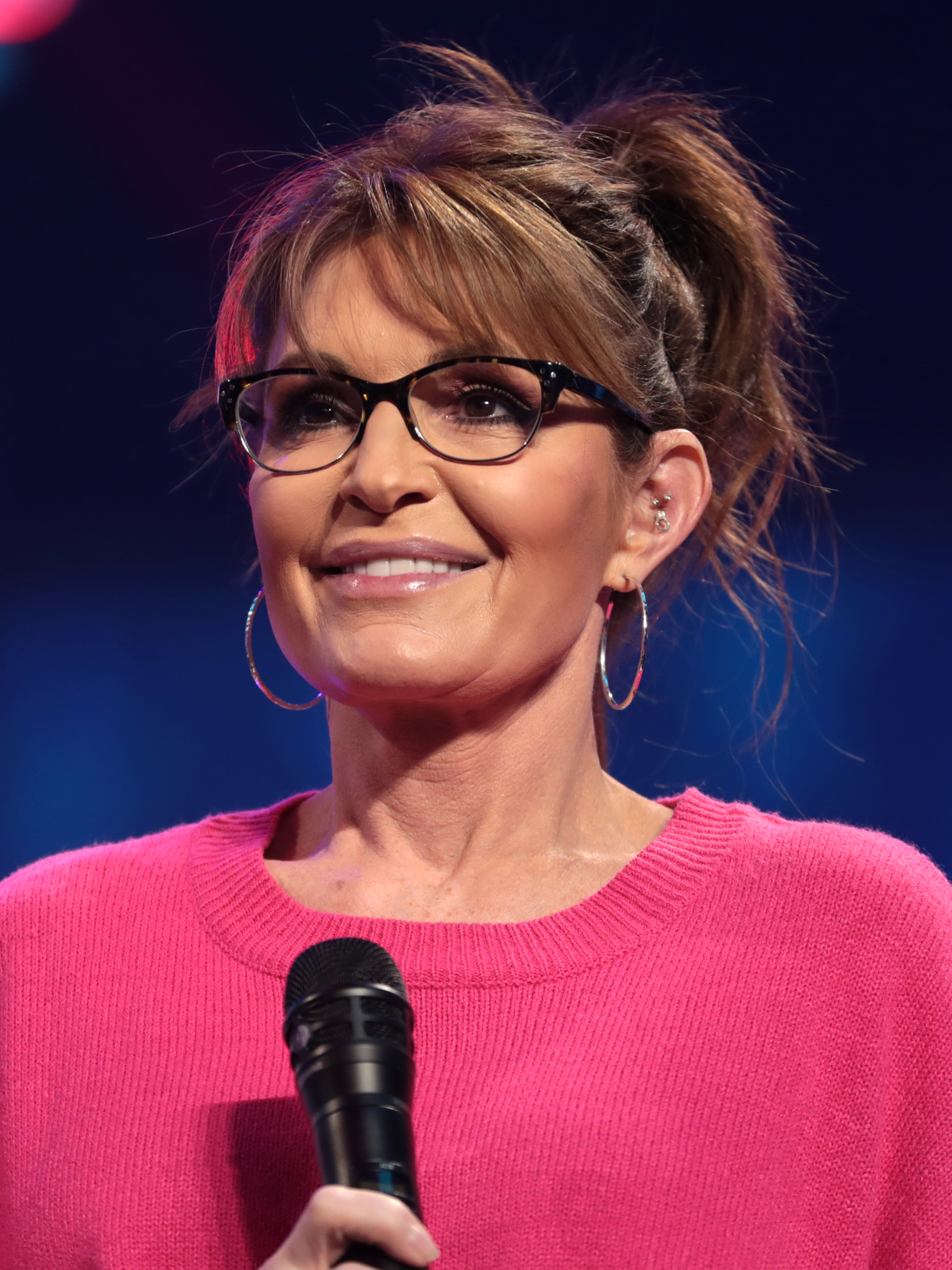
Sarah Palin

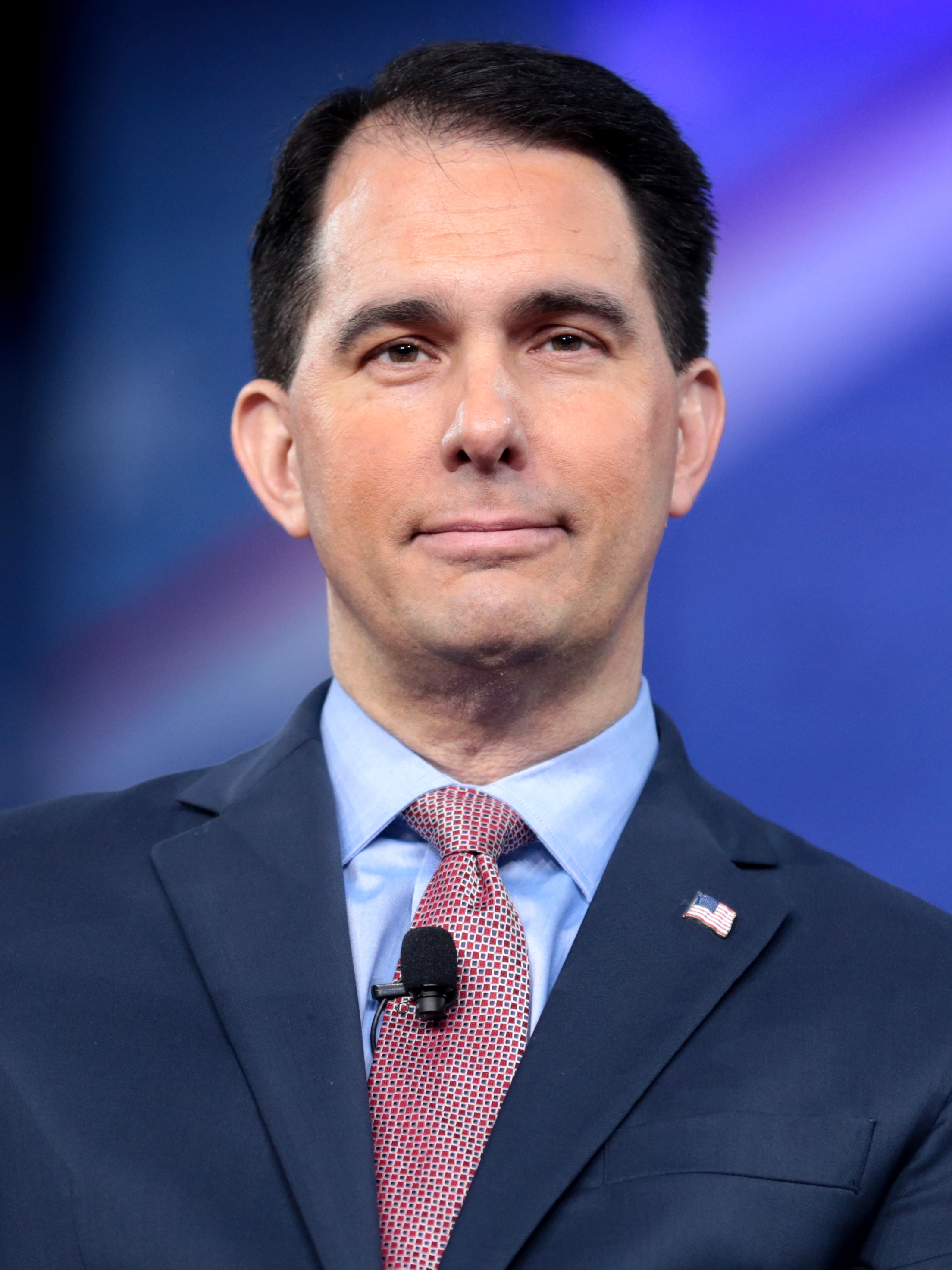
Scott Walker

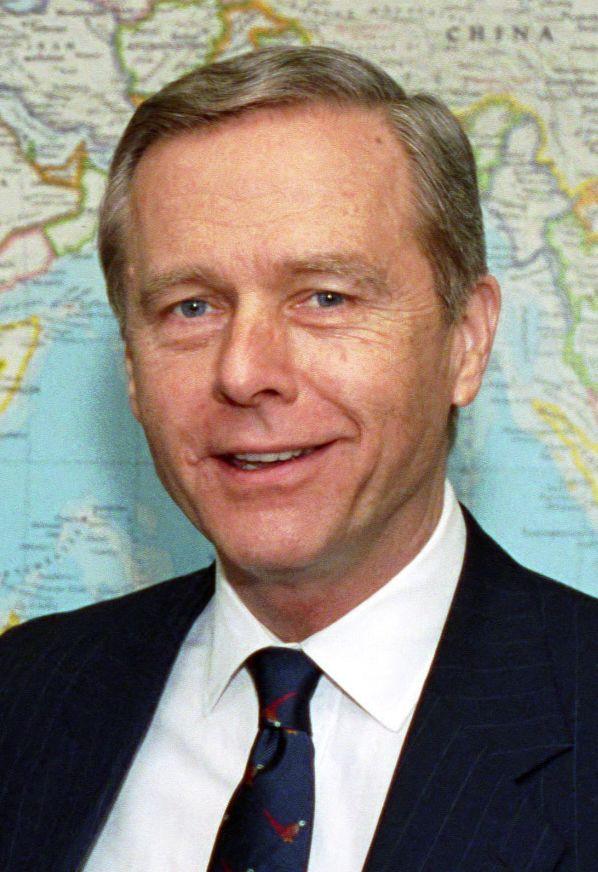
Pete Wilson

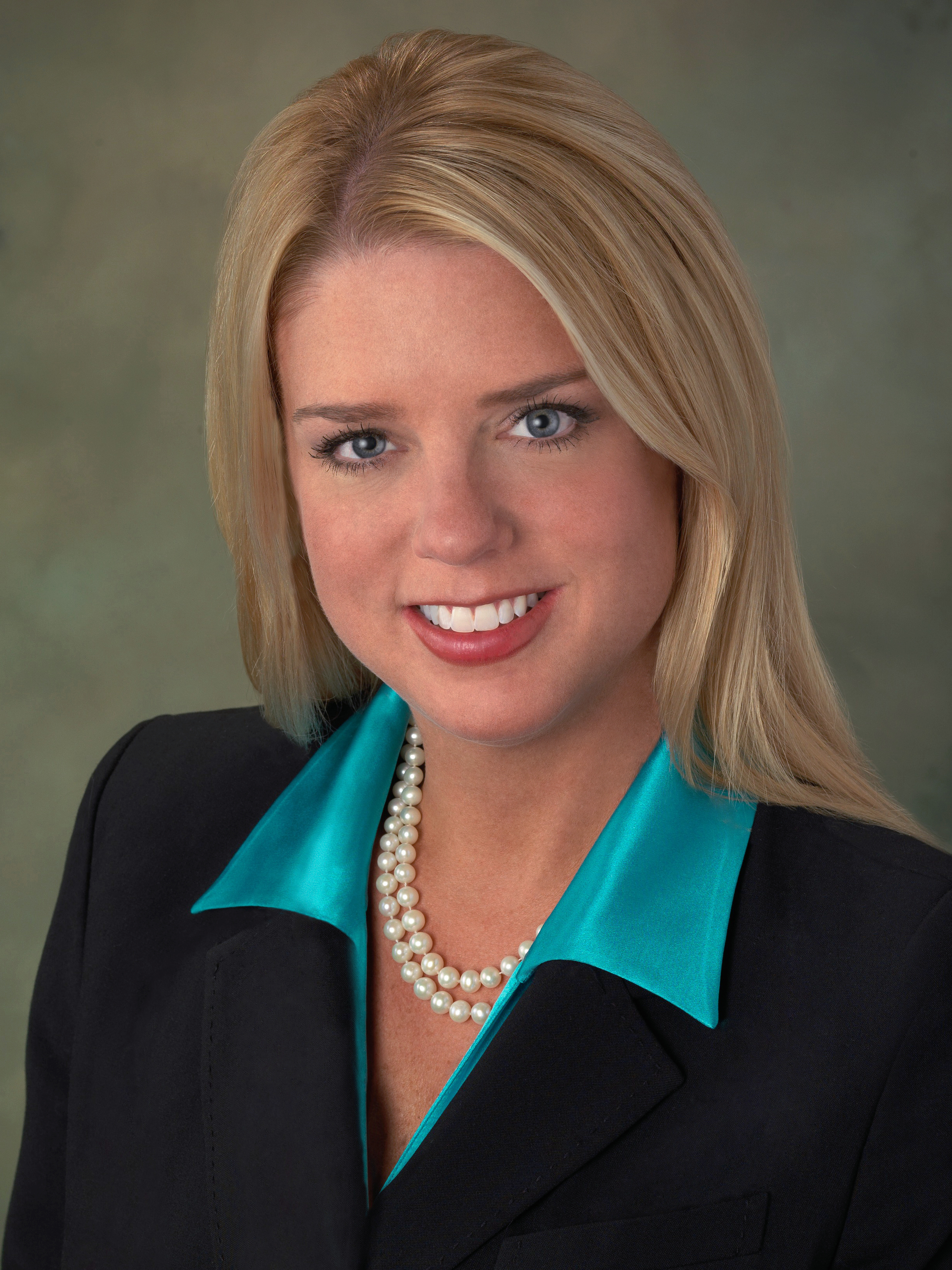
Pam Bondi

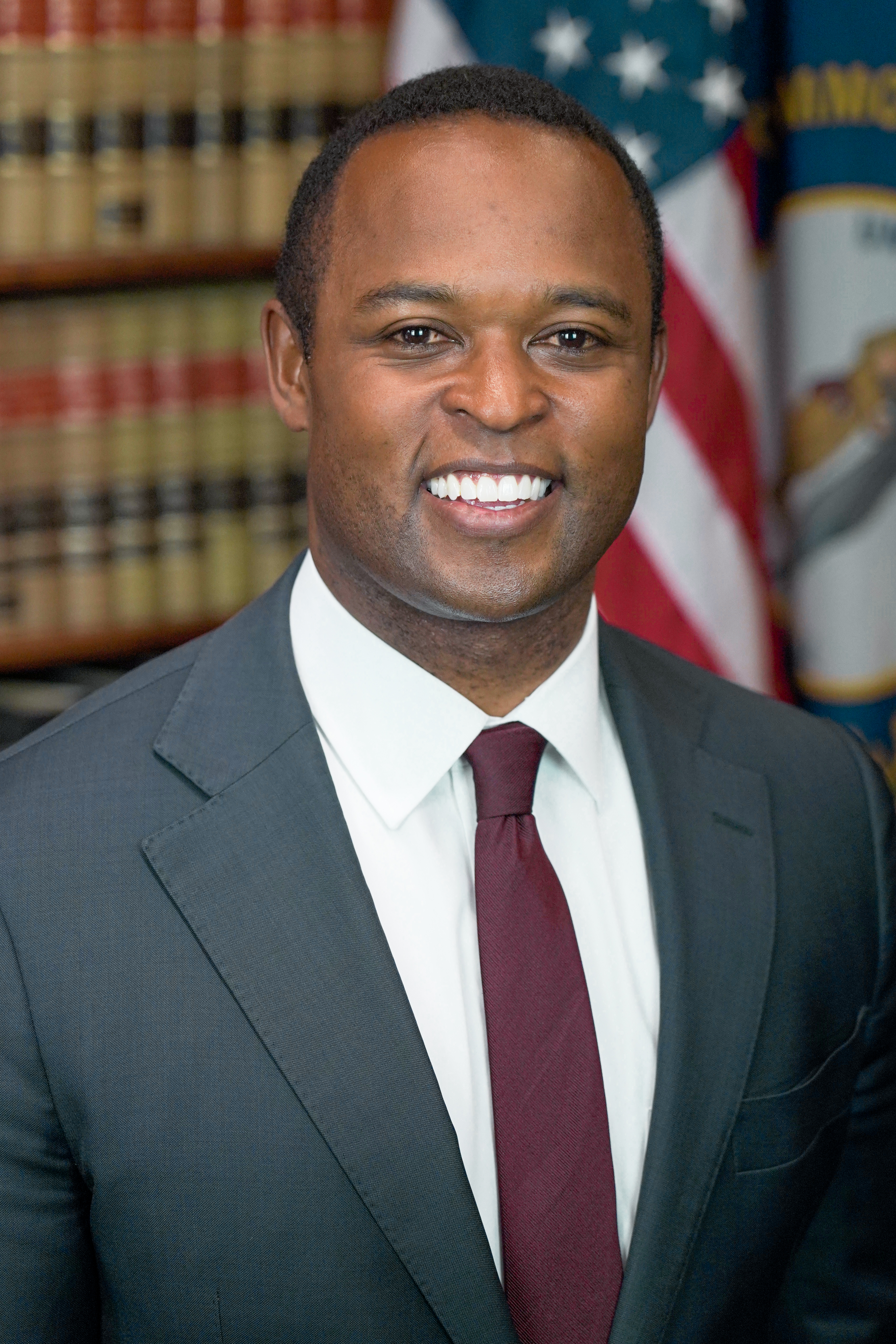
David Cameron

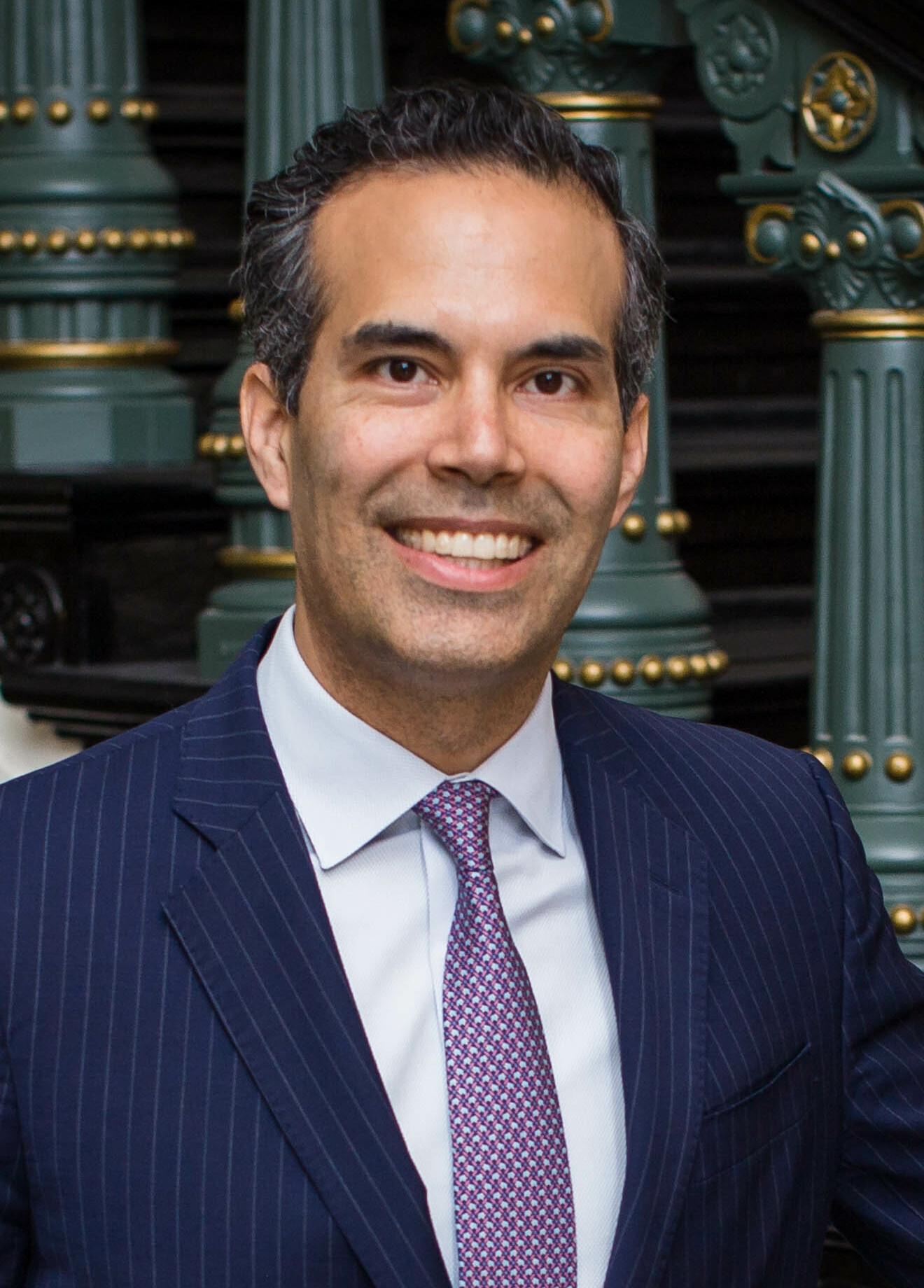
George P. Bush

=== Governors ===
- Haley Barbour, 63rd Governor of Mississippi (2004–2012), Chair of the Republican National Committee (1993–1997), and White House Director of Political Affairs (1986–1987)
- Rod Blagojevich, 40th Governor of Illinois (2003–2009) and Member of the U.S. House of Representatives from Illinois's 5th district (1997–2003) (Democrat)
- Jan Brewer, 22nd Governor of Arizona (2009–2015)
- Phil Bryant, 64th Governor of Mississippi (2012–2020)
- Felix Perez Camacho, 7th Governor of Guam (2003–2011)
- Jeff Colyer, 47th Governor of Kansas (2018–2019)
- Doug Ducey, 23rd Governor of Arizona (2015–2023)
- Bob Ehrlich, 60th Governor of Maryland (2003–2007) and Member of the U.S. House of Representatives from Maryland's 2nd district (1995–2003)
- Eric Greitens, 56th Governor of Missouri (2017–2018)
- Mike Huckabee, 44th Governor of Arkansas (1996–2007)
- Bobby Jindal, 55th Governor of Louisiana (2008–2016), Member of the U.S. House of Representatives from Louisiana's 1st district, and Assistant Secretary of Health and Human Services for Planning and Evaluation (2001–2003)
- Frank Keating, 25th Governor of Oklahoma (1995–2003), United States Deputy Secretary of Housing and Urban Development (1992–1993), and United States Associate Attorney General (1988–1990)
- Susana Martinez, 31st Governor of New Mexico (2011–2019)
- Bob McDonnell, 71st Governor of Virginia (2010–2014)
- Chuck Morse, Acting Governor of New Hampshire (2017)
- Sarah Palin, 9th Governor of Alaska (2006–2009)
- Tim Pawlenty, 39th Governor of Minnesota (2003–2011)
- Ralph Torres, 9th Governor of the Northern Mariana Islands (2015–2023)
- Scott Walker, 45th Governor of Wisconsin (2011–2019)
- Pete Wilson, 36th Governor of California (1991–1999) and United States Senator from California (1983–1991)

=== Lieutenant governors ===
- André Bauer, 87th Lieutenant Governor of South Carolina (2003–2011)
- Craig Campbell, 10th Lieutenant Governor of Alaska (2009–2010)
- Abel Maldonado, 48th Lieutenant Governor of California (2010–2011)

=== Secretaries of state ===
- Ken Blackwell, 48th Secretary of State of Ohio (1999–2007)
- John Merrill, 53rd Secretary of State of Alabama (2015–2023)
- Jim Miles, 40th Secretary of State of South Carolina (1991–2003)

=== Attorneys general ===
- Pam Bondi, 37th Attorney General of Florida (2011–2019)
- Daniel Cameron, 51st Attorney General of Kentucky (2019–2024)
- Curtis Hill, 43rd Attorney General of Indiana (2017–2021)
- Derek Schmidt, 44th Attorney General of Kansas (2011–2023)
- Bill Schuette, 53rd Attorney General of Michigan (2011–2019)
- Dennis Vacco, 62nd Attorney General of New York (1995–1998) and United States Attorney for the Western District of New York (1988–1993)

=== Treasurers ===
- Josh Mandel, Treasurer of Ohio (2011–2019)
- Dan Schwartz, 22nd Treasurer of Nevada (2015–2019)

=== Auditors ===
- Mike Harmon, Auditor of Kentucky (2016–2024)

=== Public service commissioners ===
- Dane Maxwell, Member of the Mississippi Public Service Commission from the Southern district (2020–2024)

=== Board of regents ===
- Karrin Taylor Robson, Member of the Arizona Board of Regents (2017–2021)

=== Other ===
- George P. Bush, 28th Land Commissioner of Texas (2015–2023)
- Chris Kise, Solicitor General of Florida (2003–2007)
- Russell Prescott, Member of the New Hampshire Executive Council from the 3rd district (2017–2021)
- Catherine Templeton, Director of the South Carolina Department of Health and Environmental Control (2012–2015)
- Don Tracy, Chair of the Illinois Gaming Board (2015–2019)
- Lucé Vela, 12th First Lady of Puerto Rico (2009–2013)
- Andrew R. Wheeler, 12th Virginia Secretary of Natural Resources (2022–2024) and 15th Administrator of the Environmental Protection Agency (2018–2021)

== State judicial officials ==
- Russell Mock, Presiding Judge, Ohio First District Court of Appeals (2015–2021)

== State Legislators ==
=== State Senators ===
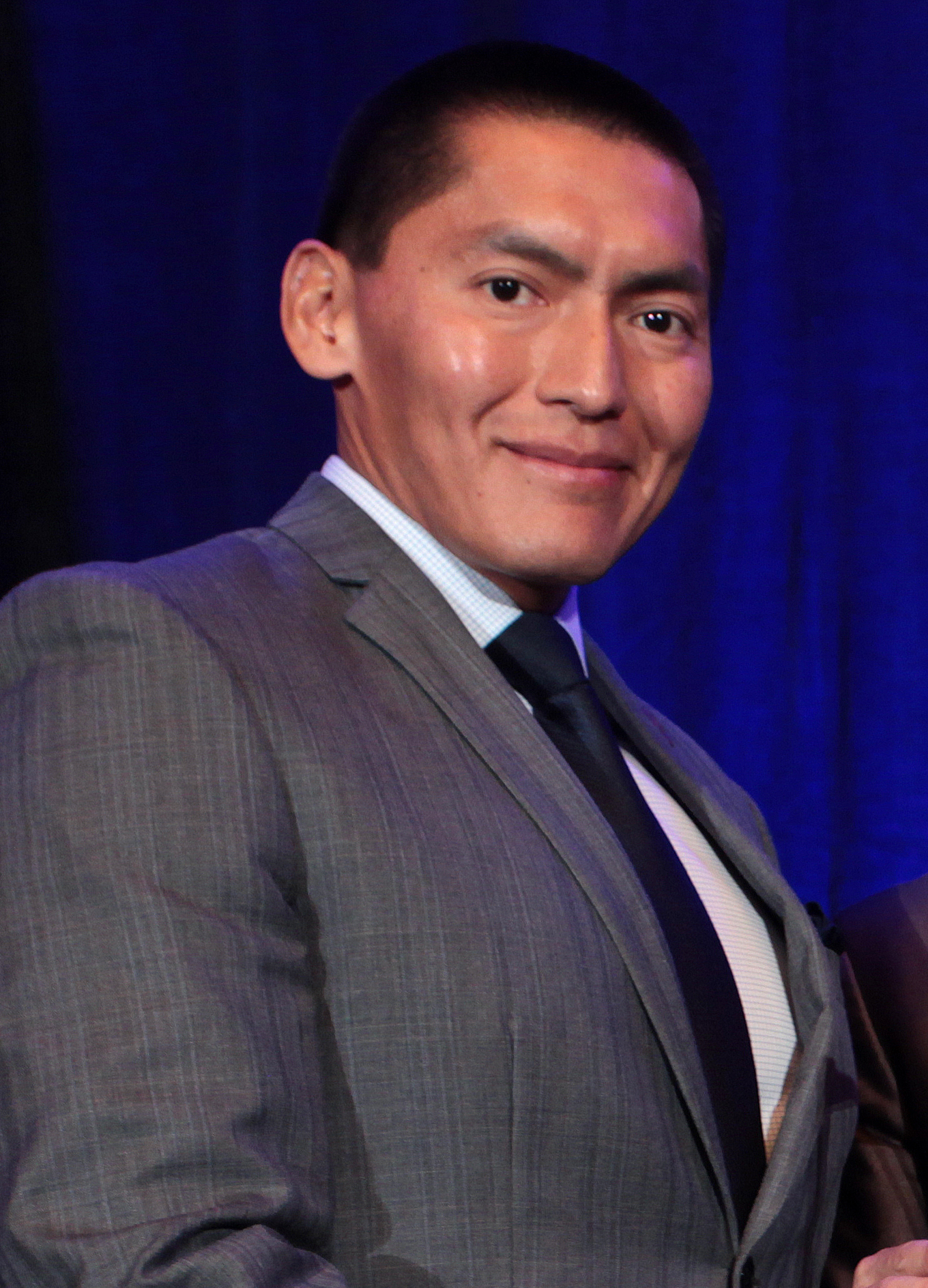
Carlyle Begay

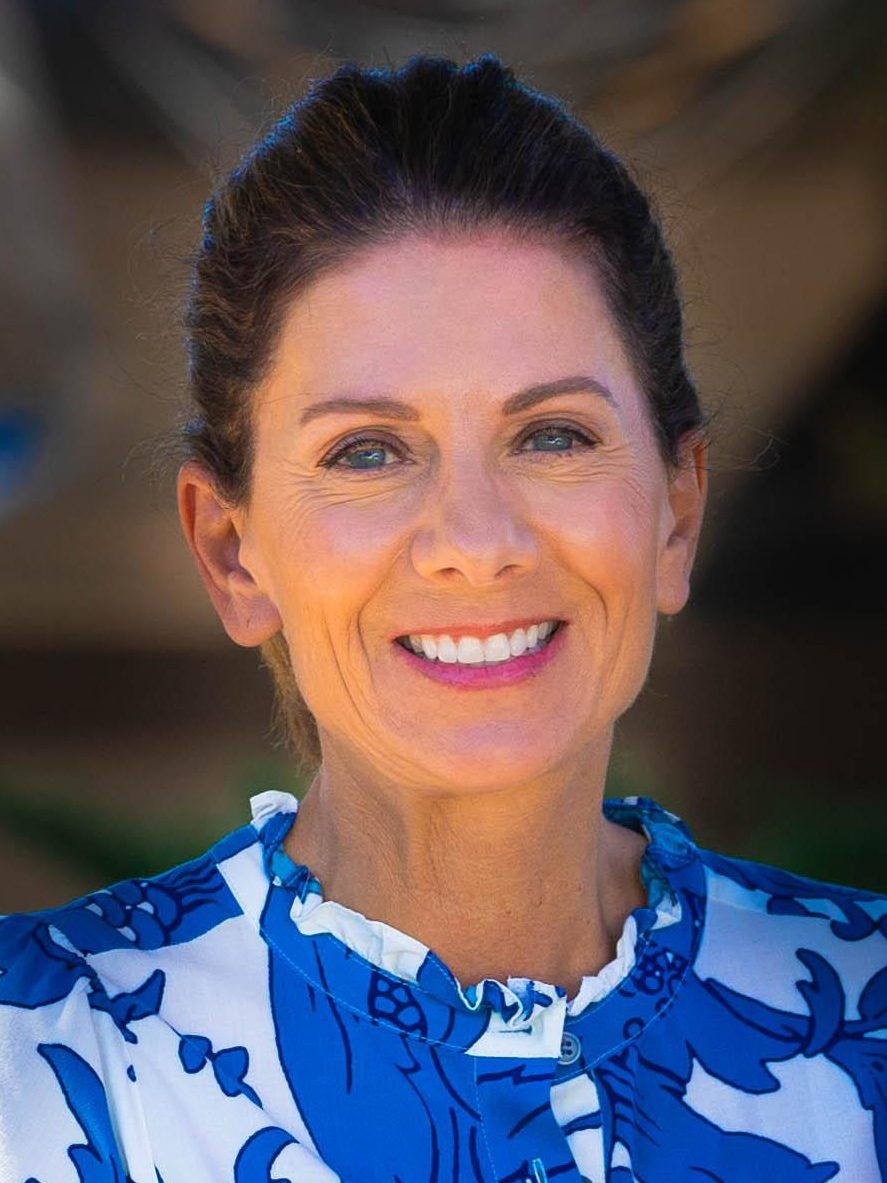
Melissa Melendez

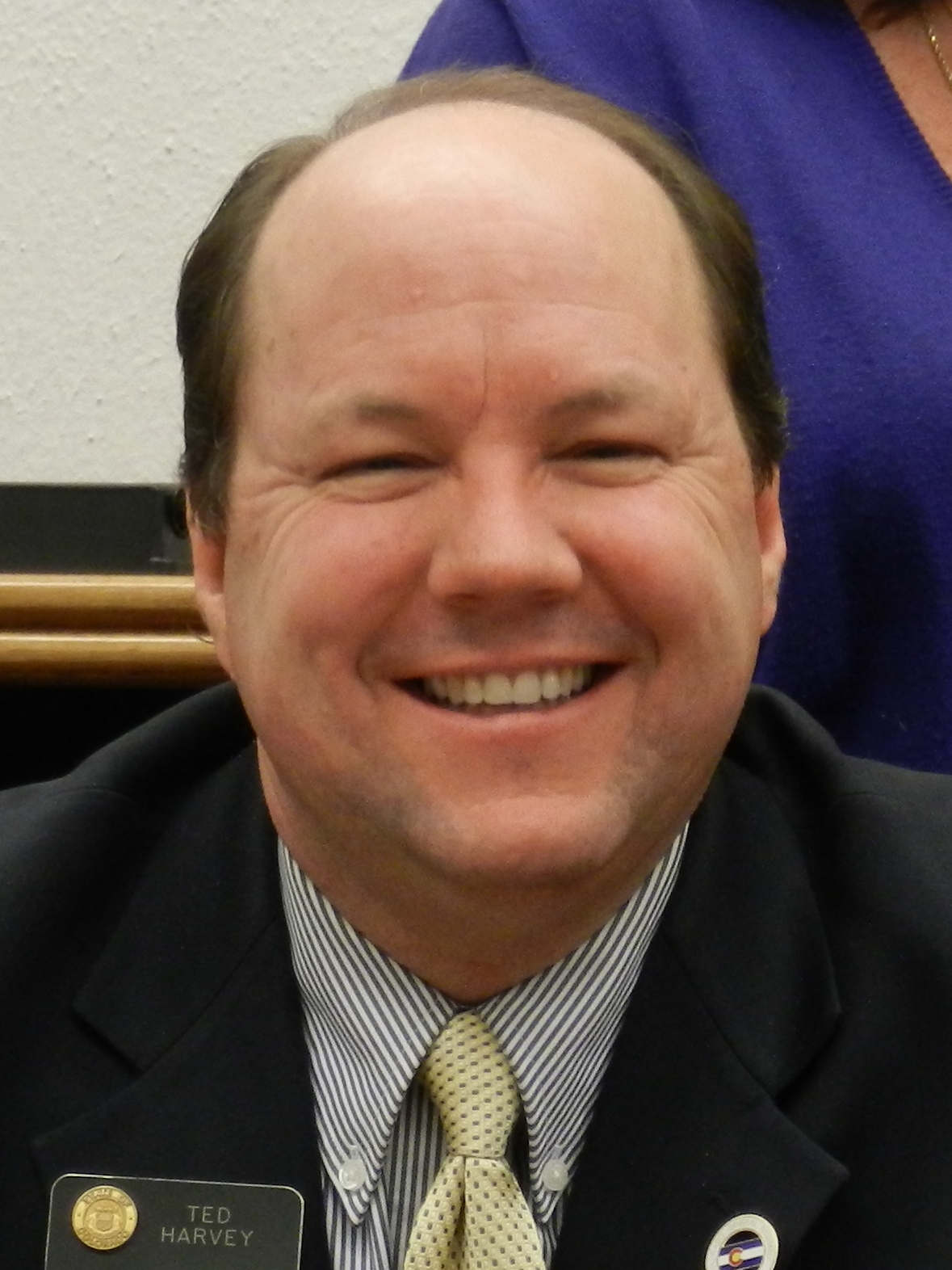
Ted Harvey

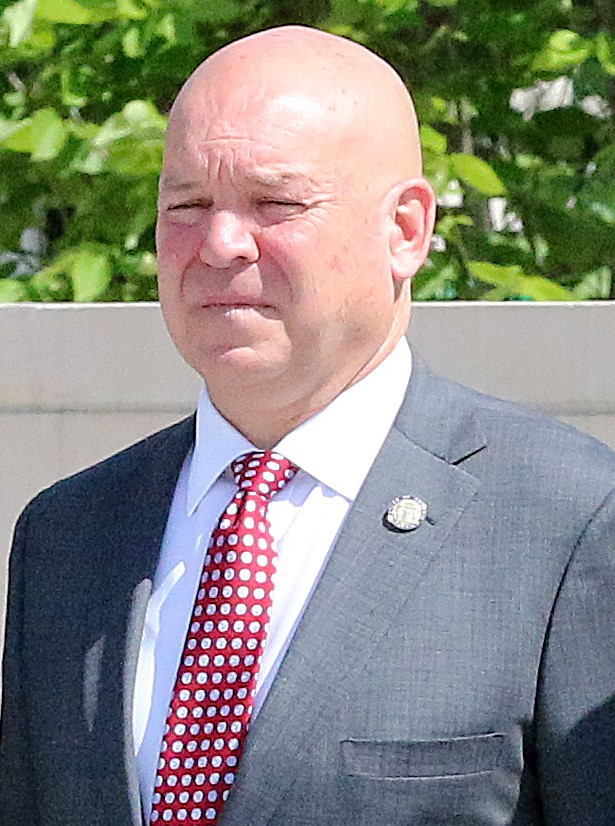
Mike Dugan

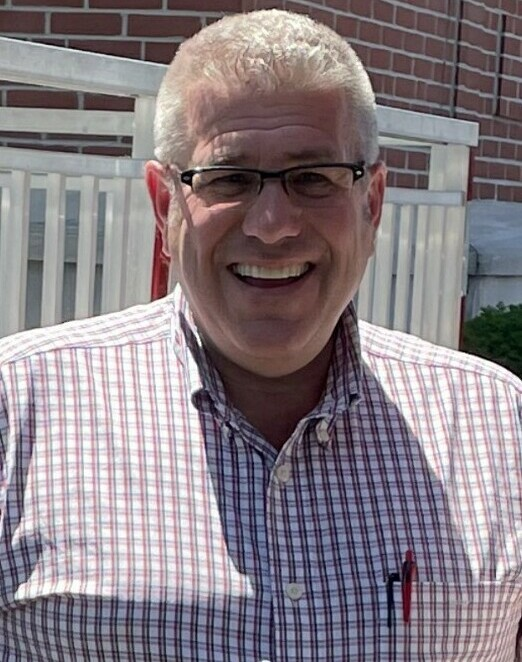
Darren Bailey

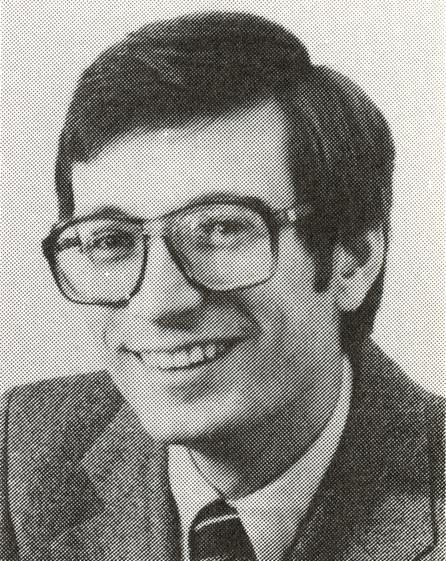
Tad Jude

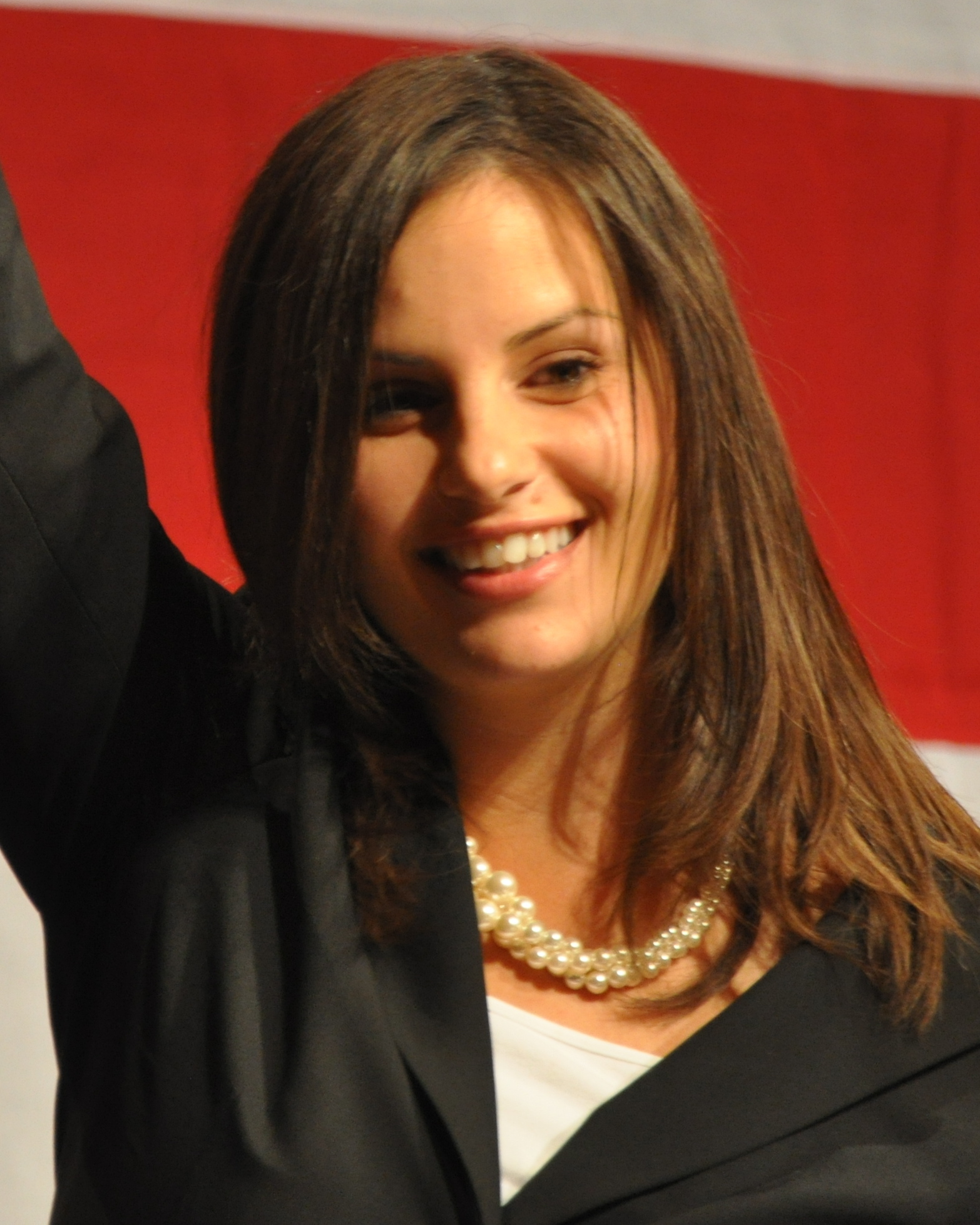
Elizabeth Helgelien

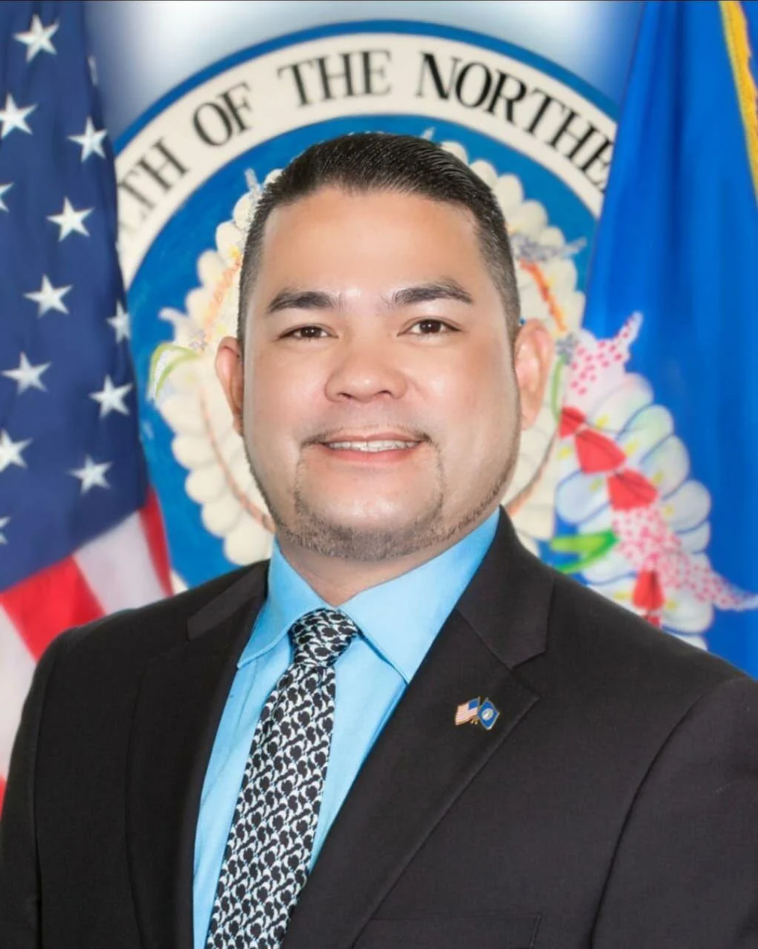
Vinnie Sablan

==== Alabama Senate ====
- Dick Brewbaker, Member of the Alabama Senate from the 25th district (2010–2018)
- Tom Whatley, Member of the Alabama Senate from the 27th district (2010–2022)

==== Alaska Senate ====
- Dave Donley, Member of the Alaska Senate from the J district (Midtown Anchorage) (1993–2003)
- Jerry Ward, Member of the Alaska Senate from the E district (1997–2005)

==== Arizona Senate ====
- Carlyle Begay, Member of the Arizona Senate from the 7th district (2013–2017)

==== Arkansas Senate ====
- Jason Rapert, Member of the Arkansas Senate from the 35th district (2013–2023) and Member of the Arkansas Senate from the 18th district (2011–2013)

==== California Senate ====
- Melissa Melendez, Member of the California State Senate from the 28th district (2020–2022)
- Gloria Romero, Majority Leader of the California Senate (2005–2008) and Member of the California State Senate from the 24th district (2001–2010)

==== Colorado Senate ====
- Ted Harvey, Member of the Colorado Senate from the 30th district (2007–2015)
- Kevin Lundberg, Member of the Colorado Senate from the 15th district (2009–2019)
- Jerry Sonnenberg, President pro tempore of the Colorado Senate (2017–2019)

==== Connecticut Senate ====
- George Logan, Member of the Connecticut Senate from the 17th district (2017–2021)

==== Florida Senate ====
- Don Gaetz, President of the Florida Senate (2012–2014) and Member of the Florida Senate (2006–2016)
- Mike Haridopolos, President of the Florida Senate (2010–2012) and Member of the Florida Senate from the 26th district (2003–2012)

==== Georgia Senate ====
- Mike Crane, Member of the Georgia Senate from the 28th district (2011–2017)
- Mike Dugan, Majority Leader of the Georgia Senate (2019–2023) and Member of the Georgia Senate from the 30th district (2013–2024)

==== Illinois Senate ====
- Darren Bailey, Member of the Illinois Senate from the 55th district (2021–2023)

==== Indiana Senate ====
- Carlin Yoder, Member of the Indiana Senate from the 12th district (2008–2016)

==== Iowa Senate ====
- Jim Carlin, Member of the Iowa Senate from the 3rd district (2017–2023)

==== Maryland Senate ====
- Richard F. Colburn, Member of the Maryland Senate from the 37th district (1995–2015)

==== Michigan Senate ====
- Tom Barrett, Member of the Michigan Senate from the 24th district (2019–2023)

==== Minnesota Senate ====
- Tad Jude, Member of the Minnesota Senate from the 48th district (1983–1989)

==== Mississippi Senate ====
- Chris McDaniel, Member of the Mississippi Senate from the 42nd district (2008–2024)

==== Missouri Senate ====
- Bob Onder, Member of the Missouri Senate from the 2nd district (2015–2023)

==== Montana Senate ====
- Ric Holden, Member of the Montana Senate from the 1st district (1995–2003)

==== Nevada Senate ====
- Elizabeth Helgelien, Member of the Nevada Senate from the 9th district (2010–2012)
- Maurice Washington, Member of the Nevada Senate from the Washoe 2nd district (1994–2010)

==== New Hampshire Senate ====
- Bob Giuda, Member of the New Hampshire Senate from the 2nd district (2016–2022)

==== New Jersey Senate ====
- Edward Durr, Member of the New Jersey Senate from the 3rd district (2022–2024)
- Samuel D. Thompson, Member of the New Jersey Senate from the 12th district (2012–2024) (Democratic)

==== New York Senate ====
- Marty Golden, Member of the New York State Senate from the 22nd district (2003–2018)

==== North Dakota Senate ====
- Tom Campbell, Member of the North Dakota Senate from the 19th district (2012–2018)

==== Northern Mariana Islands Senate ====
- Vinnie Sablan, Floor Leader of the Northern Mariana Islands Senate (2021–2023)

==== Ohio Senate ====
- Kevin Coughlin, Member of the Ohio Senate from the 27th district (2001–2010)

==== Oklahoma Senate ====
- Mark Allen, Member of the Oklahoma Senate from the 4th district (2010–2022)

==== Senate of Puerto Rico ====
- Luis Felipe Navas, Member of the Puerto Rico Senate from the Humacao district (1993–2001) (New Progressive Party)

==== South Carolina Senate ====
- Jake Knotts, Member of the South Carolina Senate from the 23rd district (2002–2012)
- Mike Rose, Member of the South Carolina Senate from the 38th district (1989–2012)

==== Virginia Senate ====
- Charles William Carrico Sr., Member of the Virginia Senate from the 40th district (2012–2020)
- Amanda Chase, Member of the Virginia Senate from the 11th district (2016–2024)

==== Washington Senate ====
- Brian Dansel, Member of the Washington Senate from the 7th district (2013–2017)

==== Wisconsin Senate ====
- Roger Roth, President of the Wisconsin Senate (2017–2021) and Member of the Wisconsin Senate from the 19th district (2015–2023)

==== Wyoming Senate ====
- Eli Bebout, President of the Wyoming Senate (2017–2019) and Majority Leader of the Wyoming Senate (2015–2017)

=== State Representatives ===
==== Alabama House of Representatives ====
- Perry Hooper Jr., Member of the Alabama House of Representatives from the 73rd district (1984–2002)
- David Grimes, Member of the Alabama House of Representatives from the 73rd district (2002–2010)

==== Arizona House of Representatives ====
- Mark Finchem, Member of the Arizona House of Representatives from the 11th district (2015–2023)

==== California State Assembly ====
- Scott Baugh, Minority Leader of the California Assembly (1999–2000) and Member of the California State Assembly from the 67th district (1995–2000)
- Sebastian Ridley-Thomas, Member of the California State Assembly from the 54th district (2013–2017) (Democratic)

==== Colorado House of Representatives ====
- Justin Everett, Member of the Colorado House of Representatives from the 22nd district (2013–2019)
- Ron Hanks, Member of the Colorado House of Representatives from the 60th district (2021–2023)
- Janak Joshi, Member of the Colorado House of Representatives (2011–2013, 2013–2017)
- Lori Saine, Member of the Colorado House of Representatives from the 63rd district (2013–2021)
- Libby Szabo, Member of the Colorado House of Representatives from the 27th district (2011–2015)

==== Florida House of Representatives ====
- Bob Cortes, Member of the Florida House of Representatives from the 30th district (2014–2018)
- Mike Hill, Member of the Florida House of Representatives (2014–2016, 2018–2020)
- Anthony Sabatini, Member of the Florida House of Representatives from the 32nd district (2022–present)
- Chris Sprowls, 102nd Speaker of the Florida House of Representatives (2020–2022) and Member of the Florida House of Representatives from the 65th district (2014–2022)

==== Georgia House of Representatives ====
- Vernon Jones, Member of the Georgia House of Representatives (1993–2001, 2017–2021)
- Alveda King, Member of the Georgia House of Representatives from the 28th district (1979–1983)
- Philip Singleton, Member of the Georgia House of Representatives from the 71st district (2019–2023)

==== Hawaii House of Representatives ====
- Bob McDermott, Member of the Hawaii House of Representatives (1996–2002, 2012–2022)

==== Illinois House of Representatives ====
- John D. Anthony, Member of the Illinois House of Representatives from the 75th district (2013–2016)

==== Iowa House of Representatives ====
- David Kerr, Member of the Iowa House of Representatives from the 88th district (2017–2023)
- Joe Mitchell, Member of the Iowa House of Representatives from the 84th district (2019–2023)

==== Kansas House of Representatives ====
- Travis Couture-Lovelady, Member of the Kansas House of Representatives from the 110th district (2013–2015)

==== Kentucky House of Representatives ====
- Allen Maricle, Member of the Kentucky House of Representatives from the 49th district (1994–1999)
- C. Ed Massey, Member of the Kentucky House of Representatives from the 66th district (2019–2023)

==== Louisiana House of Representatives ====
- Ray Garofalo, Member of the Louisiana House of Representatives from the 103rd district (2012–2024)
- Woody Jenkins, Member of the Louisiana House of Representatives from the East Baton Rouge Parish district (1972–2000)
- Rick Nowlin, Member of the Louisiana House of Representatives (2008–2012)
- Randy Wiggins, Member of the Louisiana House of Representatives (1996–2000)

==== Maryland House of Delegates ====
- Dan Cox, Member of the Maryland House of Delegates from the 4th district (2019–2023)
- Robin Ficker, Member of the Maryland House of Delegates from the 15B district (1979–1983)
- Neil Parrott, Member of the Maryland House of Delegates (2011–2023)
- Brenda Thiam, Member of the Maryland House of Delegates from the 2B district (2020–2023)

==== Michigan House of Representatives ====
- Matt Huuki, Member of the Michigan House of Representatives from the 110th district (2011–2012)
- Beau LaFave, Member of the Michigan House of Representatives from the 108th district (2017–2022)

==== Minnesota House of Representatives ====
- Kelly Fenton, Member of the Minnesota House of Representatives from the 53B district (2015–2019)

==== Nevada Assembly ====
- John Ellison, Member of the Nevada Assembly from the 33rd district (2010–2022)
- Jim Marchant, Member of the Nevada Assembly from the 37th district (2016–2018)

==== New Hampshire House of Representatives ====
- Al Baldasaro, Member of the New Hampshire House of Representatives from the Rockingham 5th district (2006–2022)
- Steven Beaudoin, Member of New Hampshire House of Representatives for Strafford 9 (2012–2020)
- Paul Brassard, Member of New Hampshire House of Representatives for Hillsborough 17th district (2004–2006) and Member of New Hampshire House of Representatives for Hillsborough 50th district (2002–2004)
- Randy Brownrigg, Member of New Hampshire House of Representatives for Hillsborough 27 (2010–2012)
- Casey Crane, Member of the New Hampshire House of Representatives from the Hillsborough 21st district (2002–2009)
- Kenna Cross, Member of New Hampshire House of Representatives for Merrimack 3 (2020–2022)
- Lisa Freeman, Member of the New Hampshire House of Representatives from the Hillsborough 12th district (2016–2018)
- Tina Harley, Member of the New Hampshire House of Representatives from the Rockingham 30th district (2022–2024) and Member of the New Hampshire House of Representatives from the Rockingham 20th district (2020–2022)
- Mac Kittredge, Member of New Hampshire House of Representatives for Strafford 12 (2018–2022)
- Frank McCarthy, Member of the New Hampshire House of Representatives from the 2nd Carroll district (2014–2018)
- Sean Morrison, Member of New Hampshire House of Representatives for Rockingham 9th (2016–2019)
- Jeffrey Oligny, Member of New Hampshire House of Representatives for Rockingham 34th (2010–2016)
- Matthew Pitaro, Member of the New Hampshire House of Representatives from the Merrimack 22nd district (2020–2022)
- Peter Torosian, Member of the New Hampshire House of Representatives from the 14th Rockingham district (2016–2022)
- Joshua Whitehouse, Member of the New Hampshire House of Representatives from the Strafford 2nd district (2014–2016)

==== New Jersey General Assembly ====
- Jose Arango, Member of the New Jersey General Assembly from the 33rd district (1986–1988)
- Jack Ciattarelli, Member of the New Jersey General Assembly from the 16th district (2011–2018)
- Beth Sawyer, Member of the New Jersey General Assembly from the 3rd district (2022–2024)

==== New York State Assembly ====
- Dov Hikind, Member of the New York State Assembly from the 48th district (1983–2018)
- Steven L. Labriola, Member of the New York State Assembly from the 12th district (1997–2003)
- Mike LiPetri, Member of the New York State Assembly from the 9th district (2019–2021)
- Robert A. Straniere, Member of the New York State Assembly (1981–2004)

==== North Dakota House of Representatives ====
- Rick Becker, Member of the North Dakota House of Representatives from the 7th district (2012–2022)

==== Ohio House of Representatives ====
- Candice Keller, Member of the Ohio House of Representatives from the 53rd district (2016–2020)
- Randy Law, Member of the Ohio House of Representatives from the 64th district (2005–2006)
- Craig Riedel, Member of the Ohio House of Representatives from the 82nd district (2017–2022)
- Michelle G. Schneider, Member of the Ohio House of Representatives from the 35th district (2001–2008)

==== Oklahoma House of Representatives ====
- T. W. Shannon, 46th Speaker of the Oklahoma House of Representatives (2013–2014) and Member of the Oklahoma House of Representatives from the 62nd district (2007–2015)

==== Oregon House of Representatives ====
- Tim Freeman, Member of the Oregon House of Representatives from the 2nd district (2009–2015)

==== Pennsylvania House of Representatives ====
- John McGinnis, Member of the Pennsylvania House of Representatives from the 79th district (2013–2018)
- Rick Saccone, Member of the Pennsylvania House of Representatives from the 39th district (2011–2018)

==== Rhode Island House of Representatives ====
- Justin K. Price, Member of the Rhode Island House of Representatives from the 39th district (2015–2023)

==== South Carolina House of Representatives ====
- Rita Allison, Member of the South Carolina House of Representatives from the 36th district (2008–2022)
- Katie Arrington, Member of the South Carolina House of Representatives from the 94th district (2017–2019)
- Bruce M. Bryant, Member of the South Carolina House of Representatives from the 48th district (2017–2023)
- Chip Limehouse, Member of the South Carolina House of Representatives from the 110th district (1995–2016)
- Becky Meacham-Richardson, Member of the South Carolina House of Representatives from the 48th district (1996–2002)
- Mike Ryhal, Member of the South Carolina House of Representatives from the 56th district (2012–2018)
- Garry R. Smith, Member of the South Carolina House of Representatives from the 27th district (2003–2022)

==== Texas House of Representatives ====
- Charles Anderson, Member of the Texas House of Representatives from the 56th district (2005–2024)

==== Utah House of Representatives ====
- Kim Coleman, Member of the Utah House of Representatives from the 42nd district (2015–2021)
- Brad Wilson, Speaker of the Utah House of Representatives (2019–2023), Majority Leader of the Utah House of Representatives (2017–2019)

==== Wisconsin State Assembly ====
- Amy Loudenbeck, Member of the Wisconsin State Assembly (2011–2013, 2013–2023)

==== West Virginia House of Delegates ====
- Moore Capito, Member of the West Virginia House of Delegates (2016–2023)
- Roger Conley, Member of the West Virginia House of Delegates from the 10th district (2020–2022)
- Derrick Evans, Member of the West Virginia House of Delegates from the 19th district (2020–2021)
- Riley Keaton, Member of the West Virginia House of Delegates from the 15th district district (2022–2023) and Member of the West Virginia House of Delegates from the 11th district district (2020–2022)
- Kelli Sobonya, Member of the West Virginia House of Delegates from the 18th district (2002–2018)

== Local and county officials ==
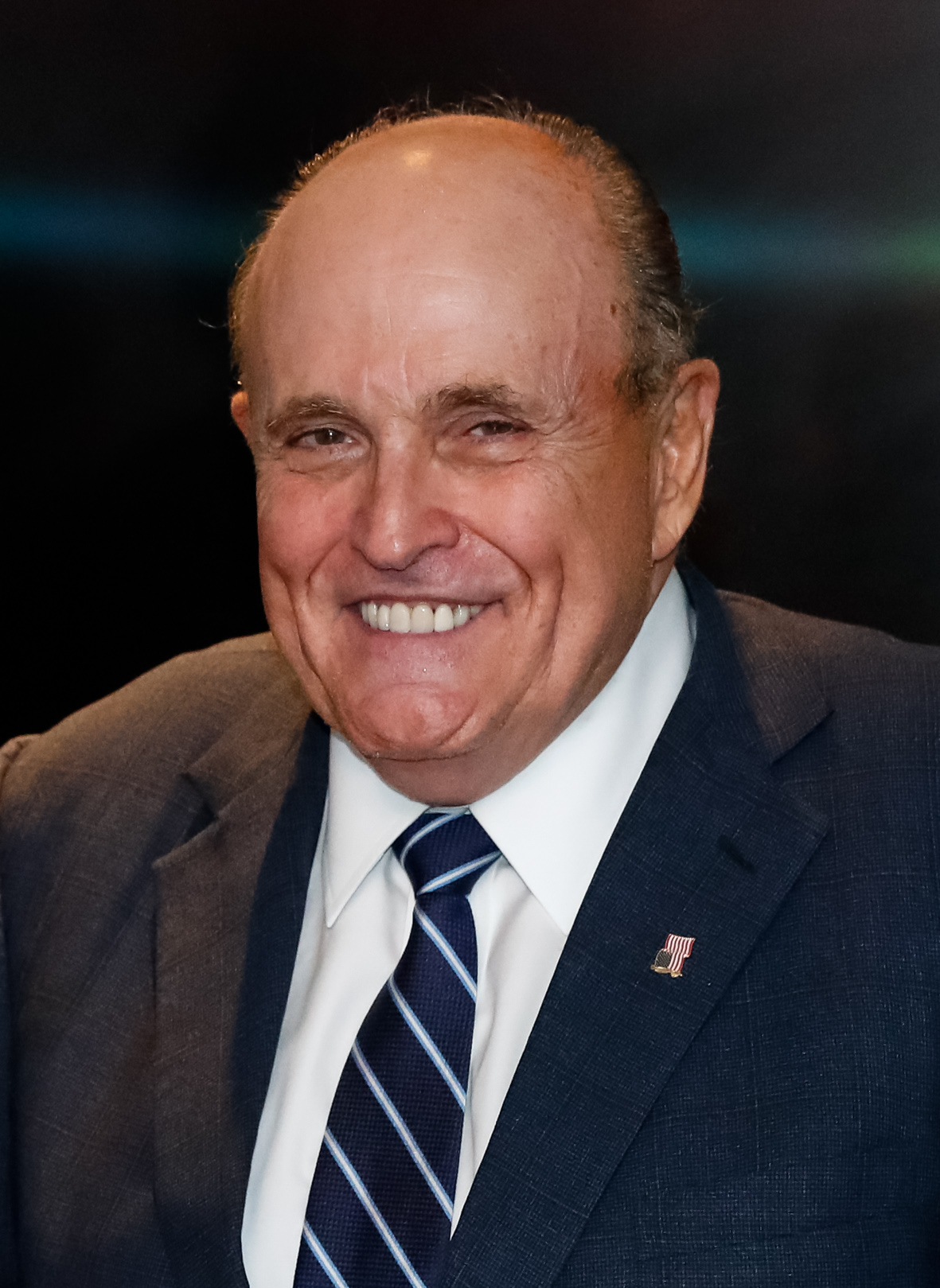
Rudy Giuliani

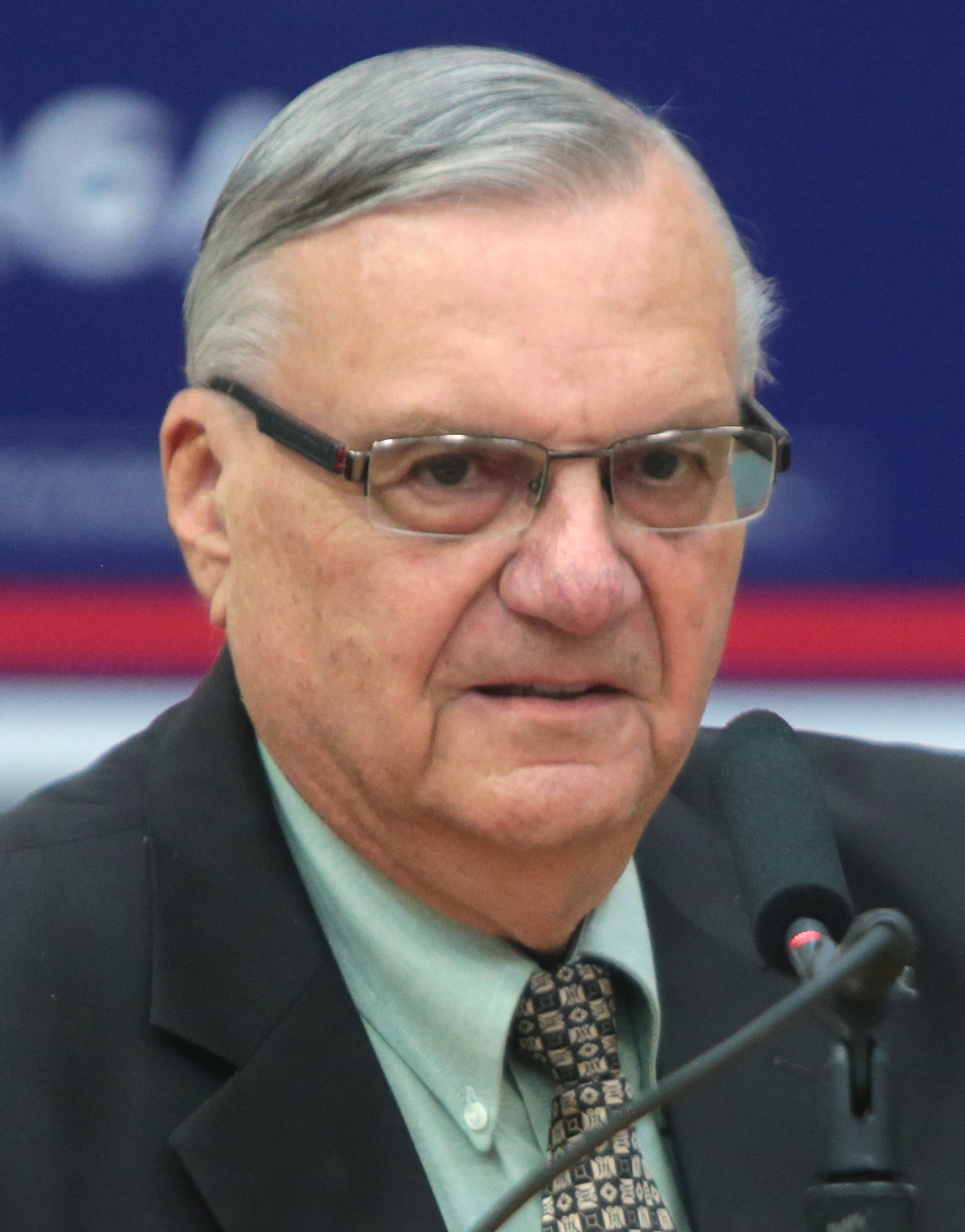
Joe Arpaio

=== Mayors ===
- Brian J. Aungst, Sr., Mayor of Clearwater, Florida (2023–2024)
- Dave Bronson, 37th Mayor of Anchorage (2021–2024)
- Rich Crotty, 3rd Mayor of Orange County (2001–2011)
- Lenny Curry, 8th Mayor of Jacksonville (2015–2023)
- Rudy Giuliani, 108th Mayor of New York City (1994–2001), United States Attorney for the Southern District of New York (1983–1989) and United States Associate Attorney General (1981–1983)
- Kwame Kilpatrick, 72nd Mayor of Detroit (2002–2008) and Member of the Michigan House of Representatives from the 9th district (1997–2002)
- Tito Ortiz, Mayor pro tempore of Huntington Beach, California (2020–2021) and Member of the Huntington Beach City Council (2020–2021)

=== Local and county executive officials ===
- Joe Arpaio, 36th Sheriff of Maricopa County (1993–2017)
- Al Cannon, Sheriff of Charleston County (1988–2021)
- David Clarke, 64th Sheriff of Milwaukee County (2002–2017)
- James Craig, Chief of the Detroit Police Department (2013–2021)
- John Gibbs, Administrator of Ottawa County, Michigan (2023–2024)
- Emilio T. Gonzalez, City Manager of Miami (2018–2020)
- Kimberly Guilfoyle, First Lady of San Francisco (2004–2006)
- Thomas M. Hodgson, Sheriff of Bristol County (1997–2023)
- Tina Peters, Clerk and Recorder of Mesa County (2019–2023)
- Jeanine Pirro, District Attorney of Westchester County (1994–2005)
- Steve Schuh, 10th County Executive of Anne Arundel County (2014–2018)
- Carolyn Bunny Welsh, Sheriff of Chester County (2000–2020)
- Susie Wiles, Chief of Staff to the Mayor of Jacksonville (1997–2000)

=== Local and county legislative officials ===
- Chris Bortz, Member of the Cincinnati City Council (2005–2011)
- Carl DeMaio, Member of the San Diego City Council from the 5th district (2008–2012)
- Rubén Díaz Sr., Member of the New York City Council from the 18th district (2002–2003, 2018–2021) (Democratic)
- Couy Griffin, Member of the Otero County Board of Commissioners from the 2nd district (2019–2022)
- Carl Paladino, Member of the Buffalo Public Schools Board of Education from the Park District (2013–2017)
- Andrew Stein, President of the New York City Council (1986–1994), 22nd Borough President of Manhattan (1978–1985), and Member of the New York State Assembly (1969–1977) (Democratic)

=== Tribal Officials ===
- Myron Lizer, 10th Vice President of the Navajo Nation (2019–2023)

== Party officials ==
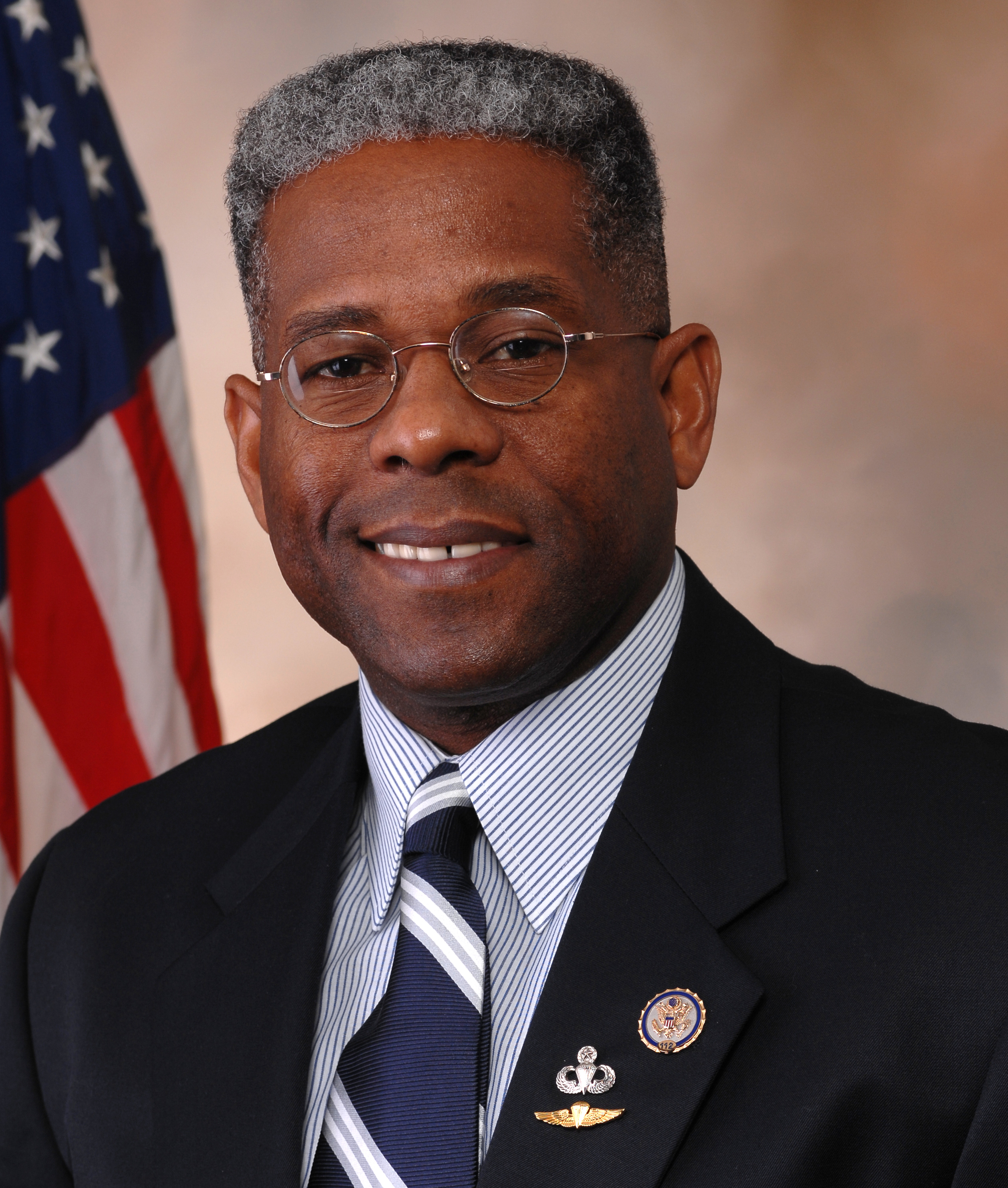
Allen West

=== Republican National Committee officials ===
- Todd Ricketts, Finance Chair of the Republican National Committee (2018–2022)
- Steve Wynn, Finance Chair of the Republican National Committee (2017–2018)

=== State party officials ===
- Derek Brown, Chair of the Utah Republican Party (2019–2021)
- Jim Brulte, Chair of the California Republican Party (2013–2019), Minority Leader of the California Senate (2000–2004)
- Brad Courtney, Chair of the Wisconsin Republican Party (2011–2019)
- Katon Dawson, Chair of the South Carolina Republican Party (2002–2009)
- Van Hipp Jr., Chairman of the South Carolina Republican Party (1987–1989)
- Carson Jorgensen, Chair of the Utah Republican Party (2021–2023)
- Kristina Karamo, Chair of the Michigan Republican Party (2023–2024)
- Debra Lamm, Chair of the Montana Republican Party (2017–2019)
- James J. Lyons Jr., Chair of the Massachusetts Republican Party (2019–2023), Member of the Massachusetts House of Representatives from the 18th Essex district (2011–2019)
- Ed Martin, Chair of the Missouri Republican Party (2013–2015)
- Andrew McKenna, Chair of Illinois Republican Party (2005–2009)
- Bob Paduchik, Chair of the Ohio Republican Party (2021–2023) and Co-Chair of the Republican National Committee (2017–2019)
- Ralph Reed, Chair of the Georgia Republican Party (2001–2003)
- Matt Rinaldi, Chair of the Texas Republican Party (2021–2024)
- Stephen Stepanek, Chair of the New Hampshire Republican Party (2019–2023)
- Allen West, Chair of the Texas Republican Party (2020–2021) and Member of the U.S. House of Representatives from Florida's 22nd district (2011–2013)
- Lily Tang Williams, Chair of the Colorado Libertarian Party (2015–2016) and Republican nominee for U.S. Representative from NH-02 in 2024
- Kelli Ward, Chair of the Arizona Republican Party (2019–2023)

== Other ==
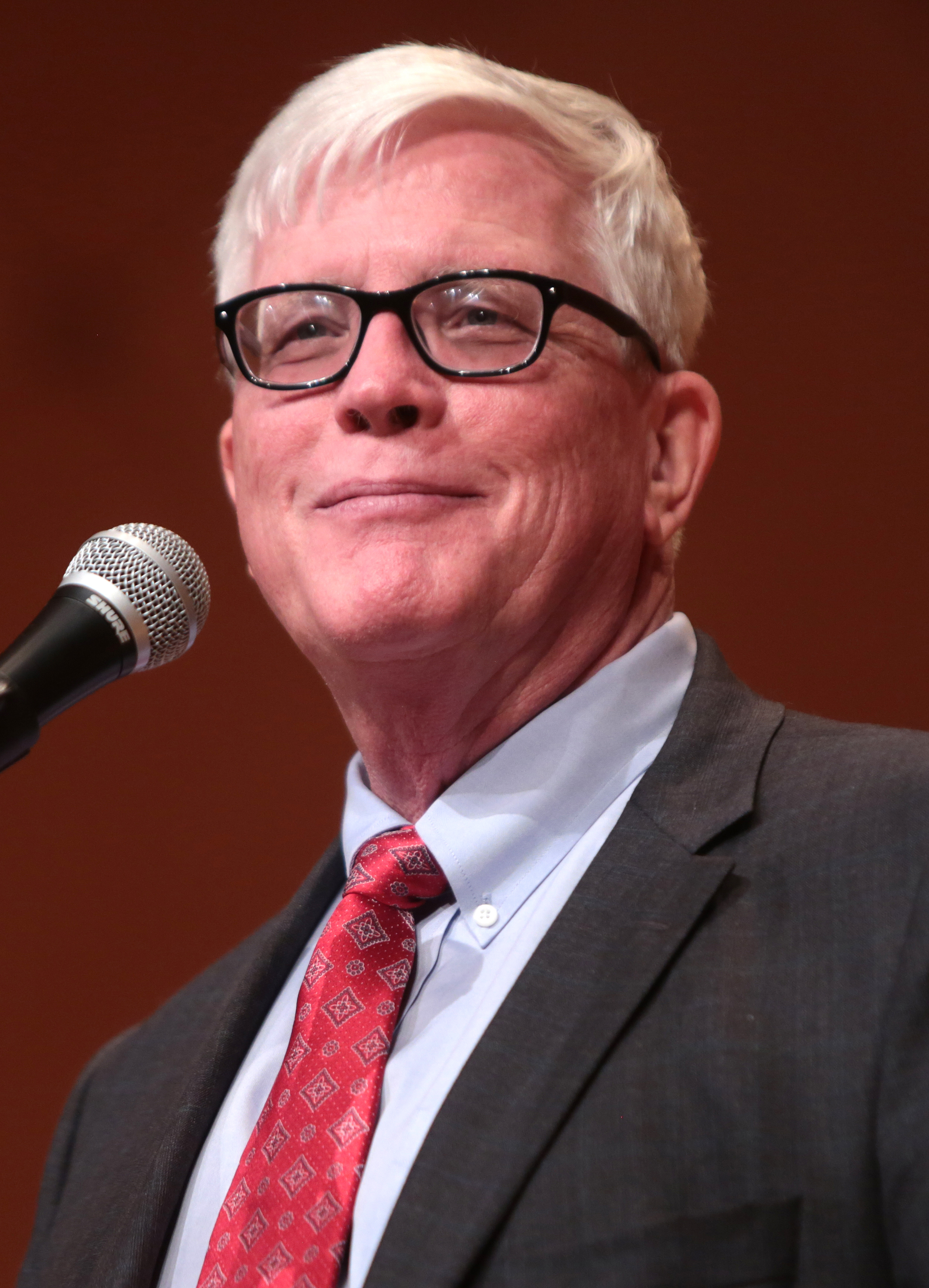
Hugh Hewitt

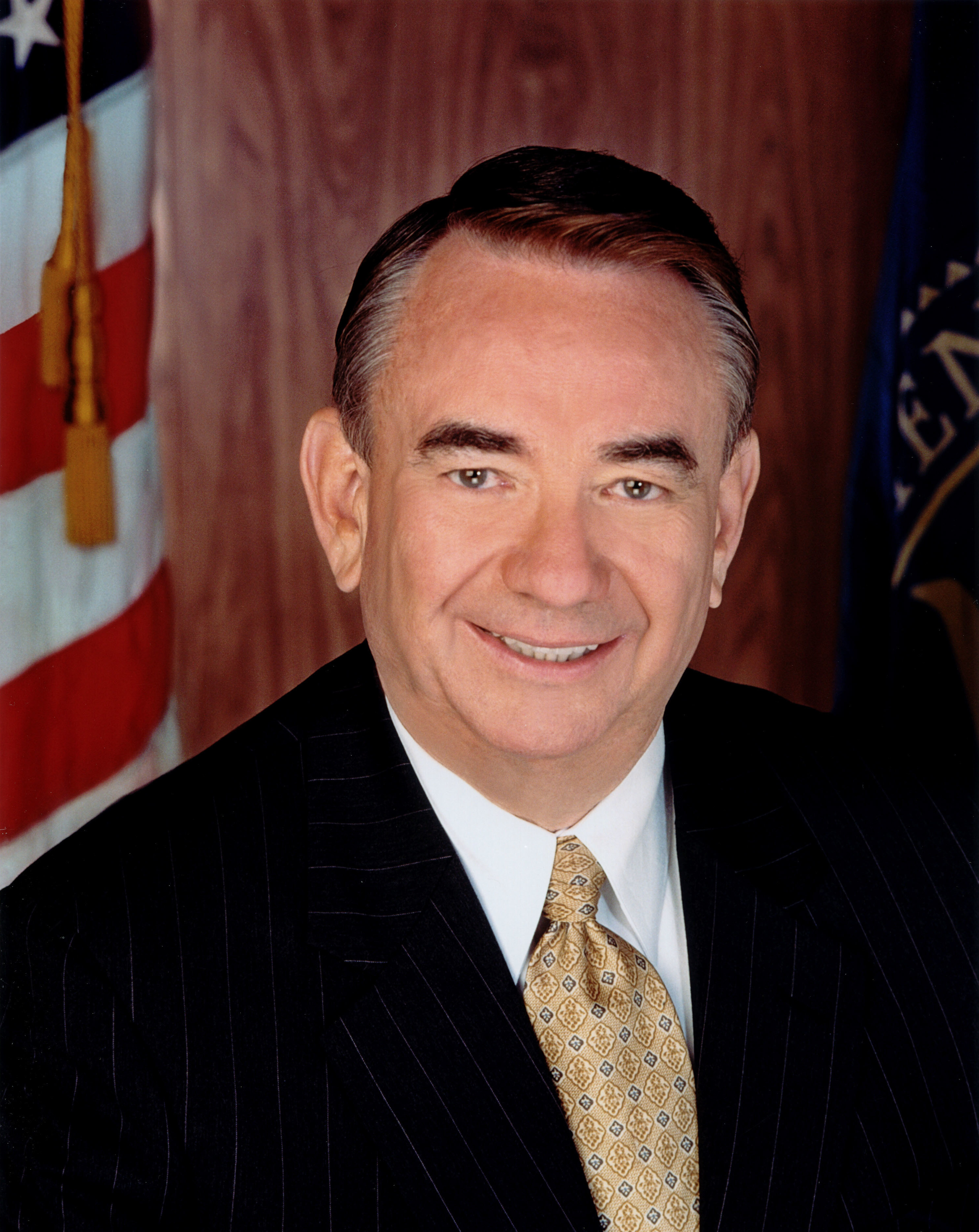
Tommy Thompson

- Mauricio Claver-Carone, President of the Inter-American Development Bank (2020–2022)
- Charles L. Cotton, President of the National Rifle Association of America (2021–2024)
- Dinesh D'Souza, President of The King's College (2010–2012)
- Jerry Falwell Jr., 4th President of Liberty University (2007–2020)
- Hugh Hewitt, President and CEO of the Richard Nixon Foundation (1989–1990, 2019–2021), Deputy Director of the Office of Personnel Management (1988–1989)
- Bernard Kerik, Minister of the Interior of Iraq Acting (2003)
- David Malpass, 13th President of the World Bank Group (2019–2023)
- Bernard Marcus, Chief Executive Officer of Home Depot (1978–1997) and Chairman of the Board of Home Depot (1978–2002) (Deceased)
- Robert C. Oaks, Second Quorum of the Seventy (2000–2009)
- Stephen A. Schwarzman, Chairman of the Strategic and Policy Forum (2017)
- Tommy Thompson, President of the University of Wisconsin System (2020–2022), 19th United States Secretary of Health and Human Services (2001–2005)

== See also ==
- List of former Trump administration officials who endorsed Kamala Harris
- List of Donald Trump 2024 presidential campaign endorsements
- List of Kamala Harris 2024 presidential campaign federal executive officials endorsements
