= David Lane =

David Lane may refer to:

== Academics ==
- David J. Lane (astronomer) (born 1963), Canadian astronomer at Saint Mary's University
- David A. Lane (born 1945), American professor of statistics and economics at the University of Modena and Reggio Emilia
- David C. Lane (born 1956), American professor of philosophy
- David Lane (biologist) (born 1952), British researcher and discoverer of the p53 gene

== Entertainment ==
- David Lane (director) (born 1940), British television and film director
- David Lane (musician) (born 1981), Australian musician with You Am I
- David Ian (born David Ian Lane, 1961), English stage actor and producer

== Politics ==
- David Campbell Lane, state legislator in Florida
- David J. Lane (ambassador) (born 1960), U.S. ambassador to the United Nations Agencies for Food and Agriculture
- David Lane (British politician) (1922–1998), British Conservative Party politician
- David Lane (activist) (born c. 1955), American social conservative Christian activist
- David Lane (Massachusetts politician) (1927–2020), Massachusetts state representative

== Other ==
- David Lane (cricketer) (born 1965), Montserratian cricketer
- David Lane (white supremacist) (1938–2007), American white supremacist
- David Lane tram stop, a tram stop on the Nottingham Express Transit
- David Lane (rugby union) (1913–1955), Irish rugby union player
