= Senator Lane =

Senator Lane may refer to:

== Members of the United States Senate ==
- Harry Lane (1855–1917), U.S. Senator from Oregon from 1913 to 1917
- Henry S. Lane (1811–1881), U.S. Senator from Indiana from 1861 to 1867
- Jim Lane (1814–1866), U.S. Senator from Kansas from 1861 to 1866
- Joseph Lane (1801–1881), U.S. Senator from Oregon from 1859 to 1861

== United States state senate members ==
- Christopher M. Lane (fl. 1990s), Massachusetts State Senate
- David Campbell Lane (1927–1997), Florida State Senate
- Edgar M. Lane (1884–1943), Mississippi State Senate
- James Tyson Lane (1835–1885), Louisiana State Senate
- John W. Lane (1835–1888), Texas State Senate
- Julian Lane (1914–1997), Florida State Senate
- Thomas J. Lane (1898–1994), Massachusetts State Senate
- William J. Lane (1905–1976), Pennsylvania State Senate
