= James Lane =

James Lane may refer to:

- James Lane (settler) (1626–1688), British emigrant to the American colonies
- James Henry Lane (Union general) (1814–1866), Kansas senator and U.S. Army general
- James Henry Lane (Confederate general) (1833–1907), university professor and Confederate general in the American Civil War
- James Tyson Lane (1835–1885), Louisiana state legislator
- Jim Lane (Irish republican) (1938–2026), Irish republican and socialist
- James T. Lane (born 1977), actor and dancer
- Jim Lane (mayor) (born 1951), mayor of Scottsdale, Arizona
- Jimmy D. Lane (born 1965), American electric blues guitarist

== See also ==
- James Laine, author of Shivaji: Hindu King in Islamic India
