= William Marsh =

William Marsh may refer to:

- William Marsh (priest) (1775–1864), British priest and writer of theological publications
- William Marsh (fencer) (1877–1959), British fencer
- William Marsh (cricketer) (1917–1978), Welsh cricketer
- William Henry Marsh (1827–1906), British colonial administrator
- Billy Marsh (1917–1995), British theatrical agent
- Stan Marsh, misreferenced as "Billy" by his grandpa Marvin Marsh
- Willie Marsh, golfer, see Bing Crosby Handicap
- Bill Marsh (rugby league) (1929–2002), Australian rugby league footballer
- W. W. Marsh (William Wallace Marsh, 1835–1918), American inventor and businessman
- William F. Marsh, served in the California legislature
- William J. Marsh (1880–1971), American musician
- William H. Marsh (diplomat), U.S. diplomat
- William Marsh (New Hampshire politician), state representative
