= Kip E. Tom =

American diplomat

Kip Tom
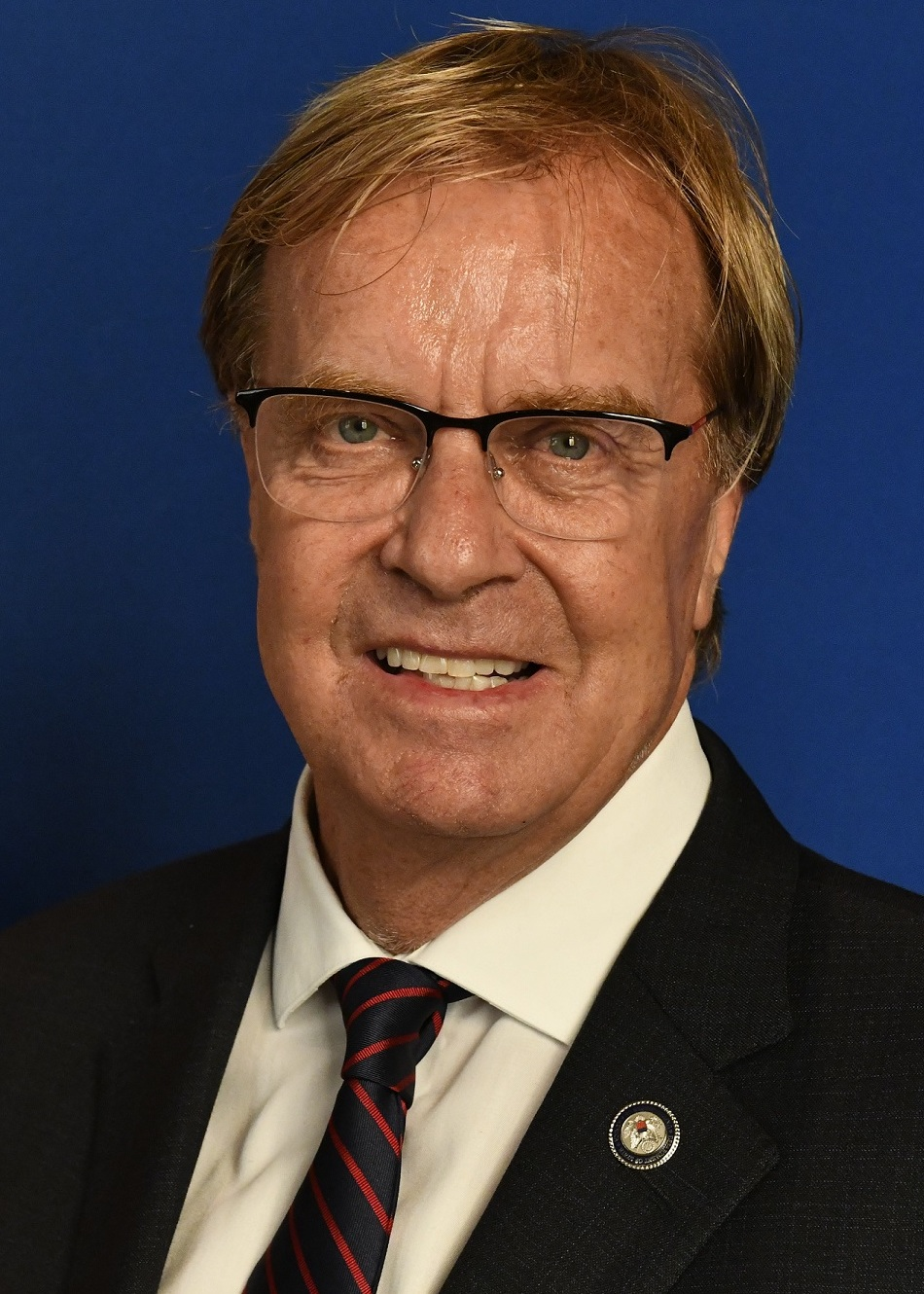

United States Ambassador to the United Nations Agencies for Food and Agriculture
- In office May 22, 2019 – January 20, 2021
- President: Donald Trump
- Preceded by: David Lane (2016)
- Succeeded by: Cindy McCain

Personal details
- Born: April 29, 1955 (age 71) Goshen, Indiana, U.S.
- Party: Republican

Kip E. Tom served as the United States Ambassador to the United Nations Agencies for Food and Agriculture, and chief of the United States Mission to the UN Agencies in Rome, from 2019 to 2021.

The United Nations has six different food and agricultural development agencies. The US has significant involvement with the Food and Agriculture Organization (FAO). As a result, there is political and economic staff from the State Department, as well as staff from USDA and the U.S. Agency for International Development.

Before his appointment, Tom was chief executive officer of Indiana-based Tom Farms, which is among Indiana's largest farming operations and “a leading supplier to Monsanto.” In 2016, he ran against Jim Banks in the Republican primary for the Indiana's 3rd congressional district coming in “a close second.” He was mentioned as a potential candidate to the post of United States Secretary of Agriculture in the Second cabinet of Donald Trump.

Diplomatic posts
Preceded by David Lane	United States Ambassador to the United Nations Agencies for Food and Agriculture; 2019–2021	Succeeded by Cindy McCain
