= Ertharin Cousin =

American lawyer (born 1957)

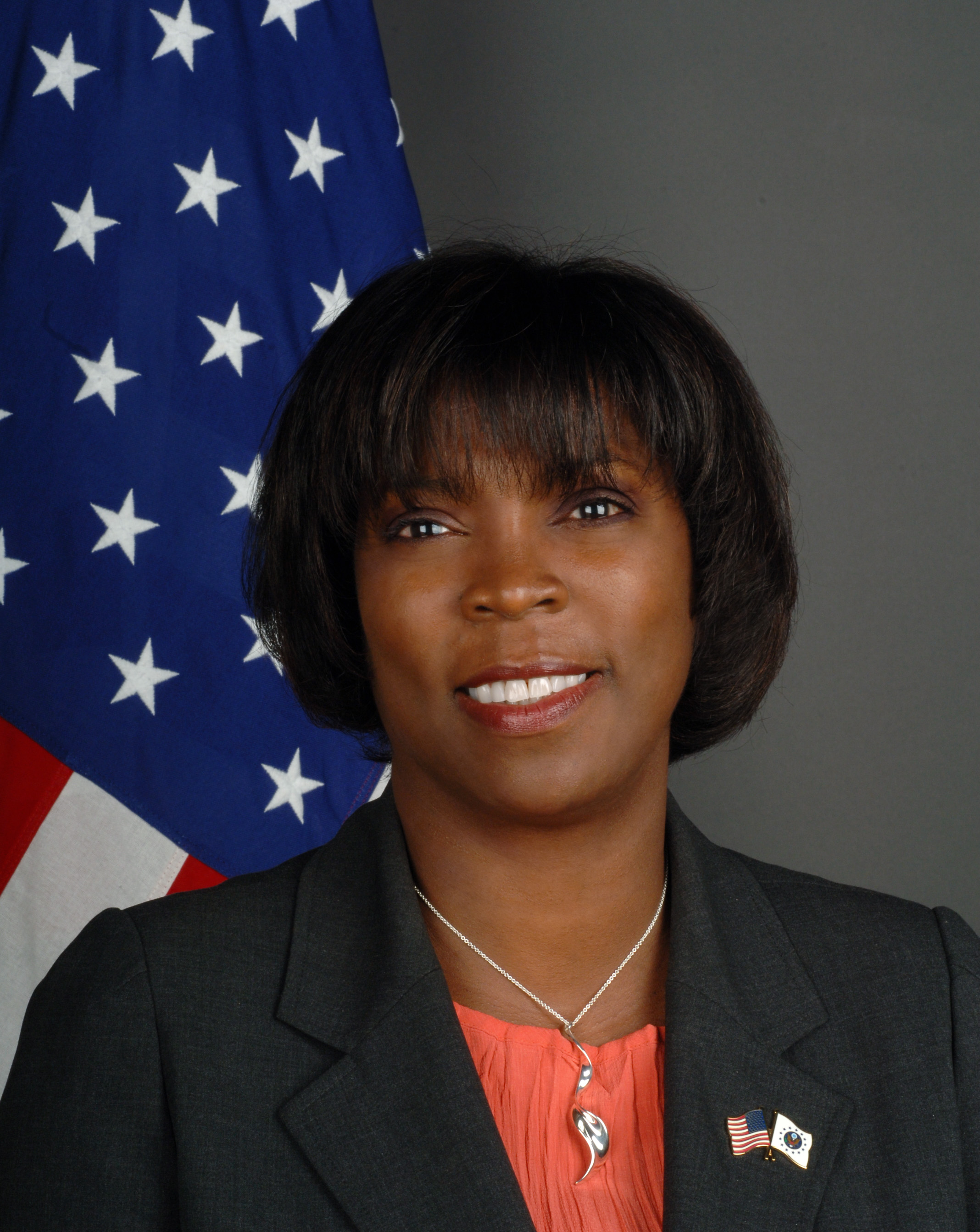
- Official portrait, 2010

Executive Director of the World Food Programme
- In office April 5, 2012 – April 4, 2017
- Secretary General: Ban Ki-moon; António Guterres
- Preceded by: Josette Sheeran
- Succeeded by: David Beasley

United States Ambassador to the United Nations Agencies for Food and Agriculture
- In office August 17, 2009 – April 5, 2012
- President: Barack Obama
- Preceded by: Gaddi Vasquez
- Succeeded by: David Lane

Personal details
- Born: 1957 (age 68–69) Chicago, Illinois, U.S.
- Party: Democratic
- Education: University of Illinois, Chicago (BA); University of Georgia (JD)

Ertharin Cousin (born 1957) is an American lawyer who served as the twelfth executive director of the United Nations World Food Programme from 2012 to 2017. Following the completion of her term, Cousin became Payne Distinguished Professor at Stanford University's Freeman Spogli Institute for International Studies, distinguished fellow at the Center on Food Security and the Environment and the Center on Democracy, Development and the Rule of Law, accepted an appointment as a distinguished fellow with the Chicago Council on Global Affairs, and became a trustee on the UK based Power of Nutrition Board of Directors.

Cousin served from 2009 to 2012 under President Barack Obama as the United States Ambassador to the United Nations Agencies for Food and Agriculture, serving in Rome, Italy, and chief of the United States Mission to the UN Agencies in Rome. Before that, she worked in a variety of public and private sector positions, first as a Democratic Party official, later specializing in the food industry and related charities from the late 1990s on. In 2014, Cousin was ranked number 45th on the Forbes list of the World's 100 Most Powerful Women and she was named to the Time 100 most influential people in the world list.

== Early life and education ==
Cousin grew up in the Lawndale neighborhood of Chicago, Illinois, along with her three sisters. Her mother, Annie Cousin, worked in the social services field and her father often engaged in volunteer community development work. In 1971, she was one of 300 female freshmen and 86 sophomores to enter Lane Technical High School, Chicago's top-rated high school of 5,000-plus students that had been all-male until that fall. She graduated in 1975.

Cousin earned a B.A. degree from the University of Illinois at Chicago in 1979 and a J.D. degree from the University of Georgia School of Law in 1982. At the University of Georgia School of Law, she studied international law under professor, and former U.S. Secretary of State, Dean Rusk.

Cousin worked in Illinois as assistant attorney general and Western Regional Office director for the Illinois Attorney General's office and as deputy director of the Chicago Ethics Board. In the private sector she was director of governmental affairs for AT&T.

== Washington years ==
Cousin moved to Washington, D.C., and during 1993 worked as deputy chief of staff for the Democratic National Committee. She joined the Clinton administration in 1994 as the White House liaison at the U.S. State Department. There she received a Meritorious Service Award. She served as senior advisor to the Secretary of State during the 1996 Olympic Games.

In 1996, she stepped down from that post in order to run the Illinois operation of the Clinton–Gore presidential campaign. After the campaign's victory, she served as vice-president of government, community and political affairs for the second inauguration of Bill Clinton in 1997.

== Food industry and charity ==
In 1997, Cousin received a White House appointment for a four-year term to the board for International Food and Agricultural Development. There she supported many of the agricultural projects being run by the United States Agency for International Development. At the same time, she was vice-president for government and community affairs for Jewel Food stores. In 1999, Albertsons LLC bought Jewel and Cousin became group vice president of public affairs for Albertsons and then senior vice president of public affairs. While working for Albertsons, she also served as president and chair of the company's corporate foundation, managing the organization's philanthropic activities. She also served as the Albertsons official spokesperson.

In 2002, Cousin joined the board of America's Second Harvest, the nation's largest domestic hunger organization, and in 2004 she became its executive vice president and chief operating officer. Among her achievements during this period was leading the organization's response to Hurricane Katrina in 2005, an effort which resulted in the distribution of more than 62 million pounds of food to those in need across the Gulf Coast region of the United States. Cousin helped raise the annual revenue of the organization from $20 million to $56 million during her time there.

Cousin left America's Second Harvest in 2006 and founded and served as president of the Polk Street Group, a national public affairs consulting firm located in Chicago. In 2009, she handed over the reins to her son, Maurice Cousin, in order to accept an ambassadorial appointment.

== Public sector ==
=== U.S. Ambassador, 2009–2012 ===
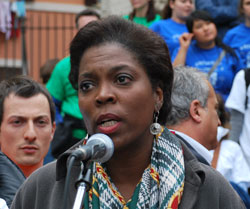
Ambassador Cousin addresses an Earth Day event in Rome in April 2010.

On June 19, 2009, Cousin was nominated by President Barack Obama to become United States Ambassador to the United Nations Agencies for Food and Agriculture, serving in Rome, Italy. She was confirmed by the United States Senate on August 7, 2009, and sworn in as ambassador on August 17, 2009, where she served as chief of the United States Mission to the UN Agencies in Rome and is part of the "Tri-Mission Community" that also includes the United States Ambassador to Italy and the United States Ambassador to the Holy See.

During her time in Rome, she set up new country-led aid programs. She worked towards providing food relief to Port-au-Prince following the devastating 2010 Haiti earthquake. She said that seeing the famous sights of Rome did not get old but that her biggest surprise in the job was "When people talked about 'Her Excellency, Ertharin Cousin.' You know, I grew up in Lawndale. You're a long way from there when someone's referring to you as 'Your Excellency.'"

Over 120 guests attended a March 2012 farewell event for her at the Chief of Mission Residence.

=== Executive director of World Food Programme, 2012–2017 ===
In January 2012, the U.S. State Department announced that Cousin would become executive director of the UN World Food Programme, succeeding Josette Sheeran when the latter's term expired in April 2012. Cousin was supported in a quote made by US Secretary of State Hillary Clinton in reference to her appointment stating that Cousin "has been central to designing and implementing our country's food security policies. I am confident that she will continue to be a powerful voice in the global fight against hunger and lend her energy, optimism and experience to the World Food Programme." Indeed, Cousin received the nomination after the US opposed another term for Sheeran, who had been appointed by the George W. Bush administration.

Cousin began her tenure as the twelfth executive director on April 5, 2012. In taking the position, she stated that she fully supported the WFP's transition from food aid to food assistance: "I think that debate is over. That WFP is a food assistance organization, with the right tools and those tools include food aid. But also cash and vouchers and all the other things we have on the table." During her time in office, WFP support focused on the Philippines in the aftermath of Typhoon Haiyan, Syria with its civil war and the Sahel region of Africa.

== Later career ==
After leaving WFP, Cousin became the Payne Distinguished Professor at Stanford University's Freeman Spogli Institute for International Studies and distinguished fellow at the Center on Food Security and the Environment and the Center on Democracy, Development and the Rule of Law. She is also a distinguished fellow of global agriculture at the Chicago Council on Global Affairs.

Since 2019, Cousin has been serving on the Center for Strategic & International Studies' (CSIS) Task Force on Humanitarian Access, co-chaired by Cory Booker and Todd Young. CSIS was founded by Georgetown University in 1962, and the center conducts policy studies and strategic analyses of political, economic and security issues throughout the world, with a specific focus on issues concerning international relations, trade, technology, finance, energy and geostrategy.

Since 2020, she has served on the Board of Advisors for Angeleno Group, a private equity and venture capital firm focused on sustainable energy investments.

== Other activities ==
=== Corporate boards ===
- Mondelez International, member of the Board of Directors (since 2021)
- Bayer, member of the supervisory board (since 2019)
- DSM, member of the Sustainability Advisory Board (since 2018)

=== Non-profit organizations ===
- Heifer International, member of the Board of Directors (since 2018)
- Compact2025, member of the Leadership Council
- National Democratic Institute (NDI), member of the Ambassadors Circle
- Women Political Leaders Global Forum (WPL), member of the Global Advisory Board
- Scaling Up Nutrition Movement, member of the Lead Group (2016–2017), appointed by United Nations Secretary-General Ban Ki-moon)

== Recognition ==
Cousin was inducted as a laureate of the Lincoln Academy of Illinois and awarded the Order of Lincoln (the state's highest honor) by the governor of Illinois in 2015 in the area of Social Work. Forbes listed Cousin in the top 100 most powerful women globally on numerous occasions, including at #48 in 2016. In 2016, she received the Humanitarian Award of Action Against Hunger. She also was named to the Time 100 most influential people in the world list.

== Personal life ==
Cousin is divorced and has one child. She is also a baptized Catholic.

== Sources ==
=== References ===
- Biography at World Food Programme
- Biography at The History Makers
- Biography at The Polk Street Group
- Interview in Chicago Tribune
- Senate confirmation testimony of Ertharin Cousin, July 28, 2009
- Foreign Policy piece on Cousin appointment to World Food Programme, January 3, 2012
- Forbes: Worlds Most Powerful Women
- Forbes - The Worlds Most Powerful Women: 16 New Faces
- Time The 100 Most Influential People

Diplomatic posts
Preceded by Gaddi Vasquez	United States Ambassador to the United Nations Agencies for Food and Agriculture; 2009–2012	Succeeded by David Lane
Preceded by Josette Sheeran	Executive Director of the World Food Programme; 2012–2017	Succeeded by David Beasley
