= Jeffrey Prescott =

American diplomat

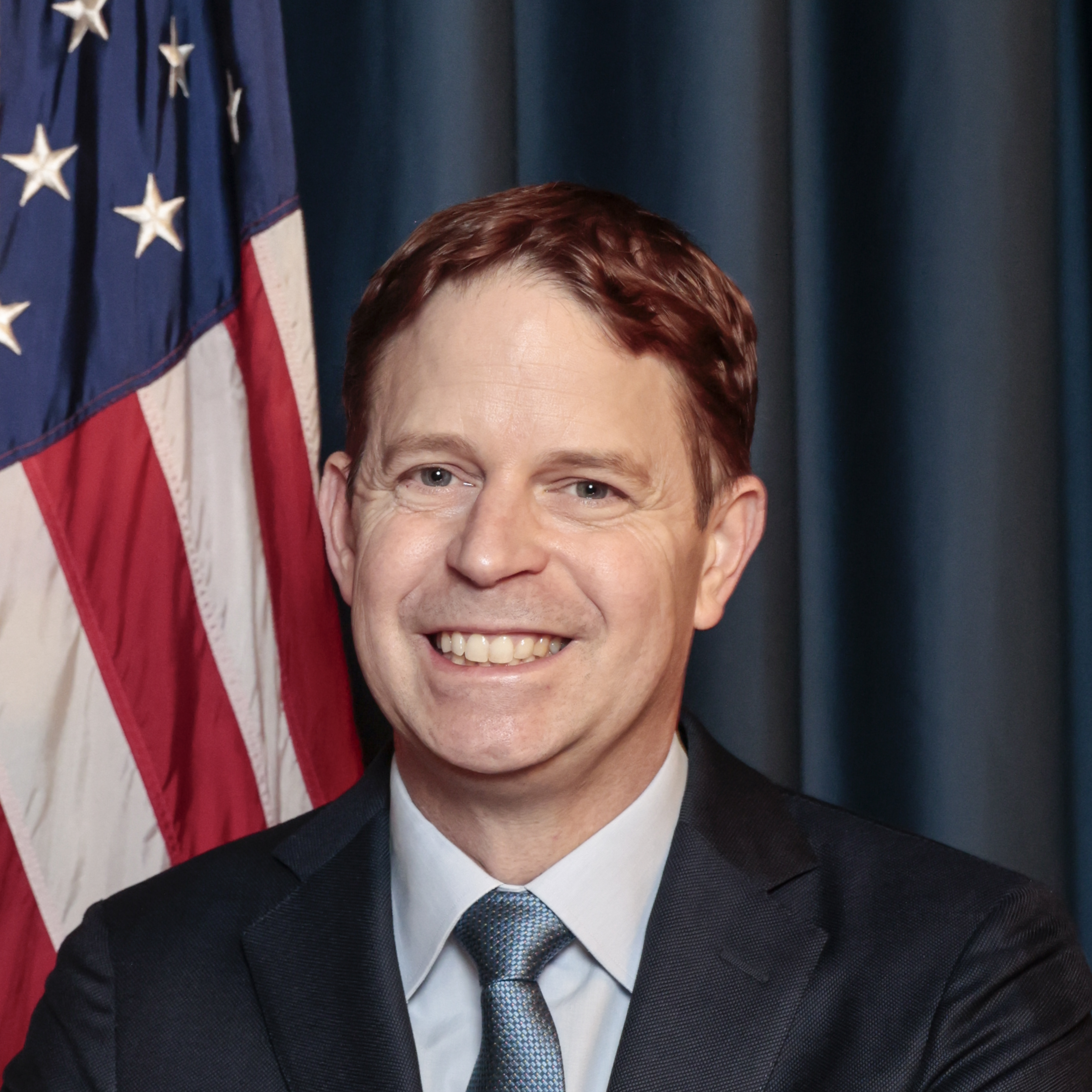
- Prescott in 2024

13th United States Ambassador to the United Nations Agencies for Food and Agriculture
- In office April 3, 2024 – January 20, 2025
- President: Joe Biden
- Preceded by: Cindy McCain
- Succeeded by: Lynda Blanchard

Deputy to the United States Ambassador to the United Nations
- In office February 25, 2021 – February 25, 2024
- President: Joe Biden
- Preceded by: Taryn Frideres
- Succeeded by: Ned Price

Personal details
- Education: Boston University (BA); Yale University (JD)

Jeffrey Prescott is an American attorney who had served the U.S. ambassador to the United Nations Agencies for Food and Agriculture. He previously served as the deputy to the United States ambassador to the United Nations^{[†]} in the Biden administration.

== Education ==
Prescott holds a BA degree from Boston University and a JD from Yale Law School.

== Career ==
After completing law school, Prescott clerked for Judge Walter King Stapleton of the United States Court of Appeals for the Third Circuit. He was also a staff attorney at the Lawyer's Committee for Human Rights. Prescott then relocated to Beijing, where he was a visiting professor at Peking University School of Transnational Law and became the founding director of the China Law Center's branch office.

Prescott previously served as an advisor to the United States National Security Council on policy related to Iran, Iraq, Syria, and the Persian Gulf. He was also deputy national security advisor and senior Asia advisor for then Vice President Joe Biden. Since leaving the Obama administration, Prescott became the executive director of National Security Action and a senior fellow at the Penn Biden Center for Diplomacy and Global Engagement.

=== FAO Nomination ===
On June 2, 2023, Biden nominated Prescott to be the U.S. ambassador to the UN Agency for Food and Agriculture. On February 8, 2024, the United States Senate confirmed his nomination by voice vote. He presented his credentials to FAO Director General Qu Dongyu on April 3, 2024.

== Publications ==
=== Articles ===
- Praise for the Suleimani Strike Isn't Based in Reality, Foreign Policy, January 13, 2020 (co-authored with Ned Price)
- Trump Doesn't Deserve Any Credit for His Disruptive Foreign Policy, Foreign Policy, March 14, 2019
- Will Trump Scuttle the Success of Retaking Mosul? Foreign Policy, March 20, 2017 (co-authored with Daniel Benaim)

== Personal life ==
Prescott is married to Susan Jakes. They have two daughters, Amalia and Phoebe.

== Footnotes ==
^{†} N.b. the appointed role of Deputy to the Ambassador to the UN is a separate position from the Senate-confirmed role of Deputy Ambassador to the United Nations. The deputy to the ambassador assists the U.S. ambassador to the UN by acting as a liaison in Washington, D.C., managing their Washington office, interacting with Congress and acting as a stand-in for the UN ambassador. The two roles co-exist, as in 2019 when Taryn Frideres was Deputy to the Ambassador at the same time that Jonathan Cohen was Deputy Ambassador to the UN.
