= Cindy McCain =

American diplomat and businesswoman (born 1954)

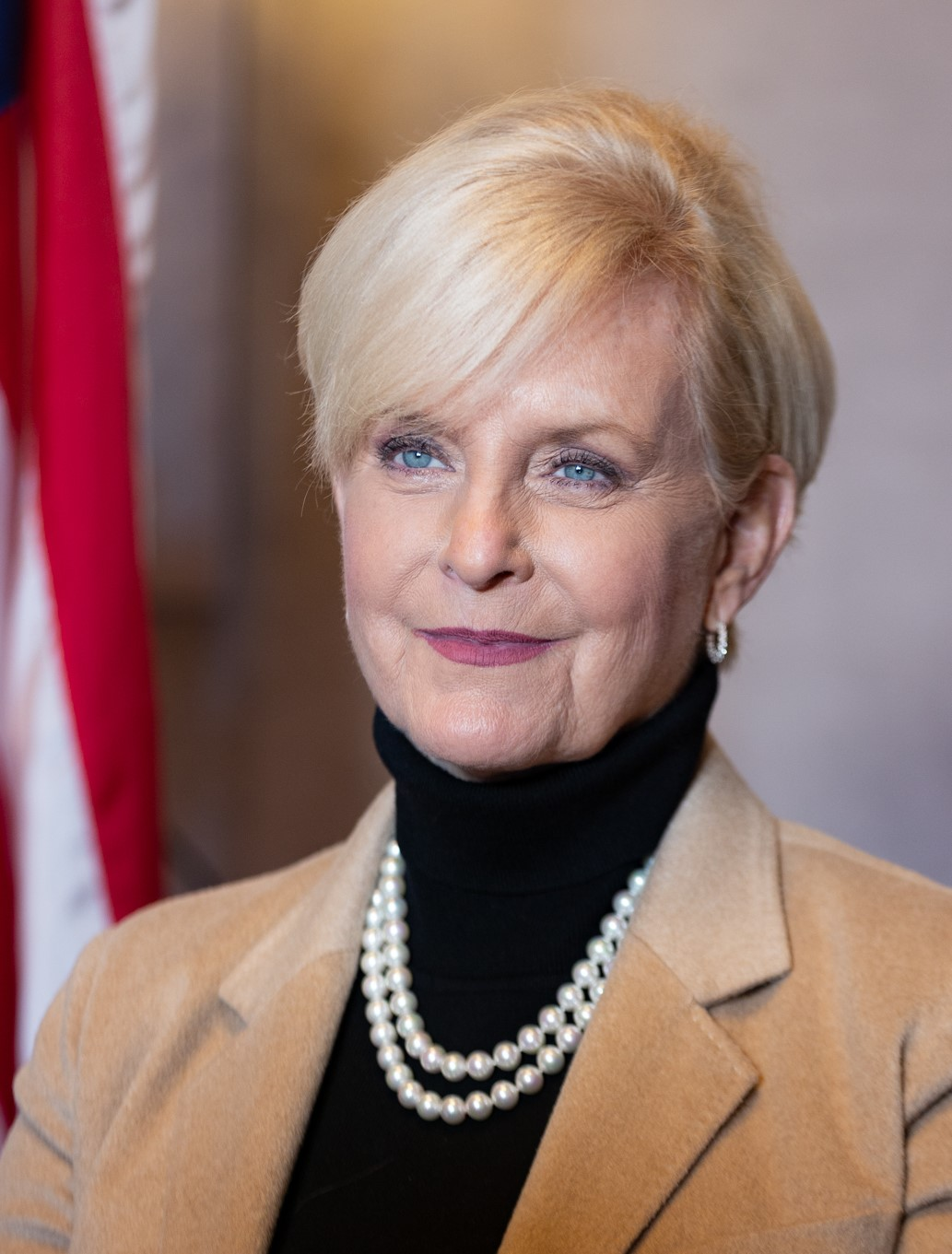
- Official portrait, 2022

Executive Director of the World Food Programme
- In office April 5, 2023 – June 2, 2026; On leave: October 2025 – January 2026 (Note: Carl Skau, deputy executive director, served as acting ED during McCain's leave.)
- Secretary General: António Guterres
- Preceded by: David Beasley
- Succeeded by: Luke J. Lindberg

12th United States Ambassador to the United Nations Agencies for Food and Agriculture
- In office November 5, 2021 – April 5, 2023
- President: Joe Biden
- Preceded by: Kip E. Tom
- Succeeded by: Jeffrey Prescott

Personal details
- Born: Cindy Lou Hensley; May 20, 1954 (age 72) Phoenix, Arizona, U.S.
- Party: Republican
- Spouse: John McCain (m. 1980; died 2018)
- Children: 4, including Meghan
- Relatives: McCain family (by marriage); Jim Hensley (father)
- Education: University of Southern California (BA, MA)
- McCain's voice McCain's opening statement at her confirmation hearing to be U.S. ambassador to the United Nations Agencies for Food and Agriculture. Recorded September 28, 2021

Cindy Lou McCain (née Hensley; born May 20, 1954) is an American diplomat, businesswoman, and humanitarian who was the executive director of the World Food Programme. McCain previously served as U.S. Ambassador to the United Nations Agencies for Food and Agriculture from 2021 to 2023. She is the widow of U.S. Senator John McCain from Arizona, who was the 2008 Republican presidential nominee.

McCain was born and raised in Phoenix, Arizona, and is a daughter of wealthy beer distributor Jim Hensley. After receiving bachelor's and master's degrees from the University of Southern California, she became a special education teacher. She married John McCain in 1980. The couple moved to Arizona in 1981, and John McCain was elected to the U.S. House of Representatives the following year. The couple had three children together, in addition to adopting another. He was first elected to the U.S. Senate in 1992 and reelected several more times. From 1988 to 1995, Cindy McCain operated a nonprofit organization, the American Voluntary Medical Team, which organized trips by medical personnel to disaster-stricken or war-torn third-world areas.

Upon her father's death in 2000, McCain inherited majority control and became chair of Hensley & Co., one of the largest Anheuser-Busch beer distributors in the United States. She participated in her husband's 2000 and 2008 presidential campaigns. She continued to be an active philanthropist and served on the boards of Operation Smile, Eastern Congo Initiative, CARE, and HALO Trust, frequently making overseas trips in conjunction with their activities. During the 2010s, she became prominent in the fight against human trafficking. Her husband died in 2018.

A Republican, McCain made a cross-party endorsement of Joe Biden in the 2020 United States presidential election. She was nominated to the United Nations Agencies for Food and Agriculture ambassadorship by President Biden in June 2021 and was confirmed by the Senate in October 2021. Much of her tenure in that position focused on the 2022–2023 food crises largely caused by the 2022 Russian invasion of Ukraine and the effects of climate change on agriculture. United Nations officials appointed her as executive director of the World Food Programme in March 2023, and her efforts in that role have revolved around the humanitarian impact of the Israeli blockade of the Gaza Strip following the October 7 attacks. In February 2026, she announced that she would soon be stepping down from the post due to health reasons.

== Early life and education ==
Cindy Lou Hensley was born in Phoenix, Arizona, to James Hensley, who founded Hensley & Co., and Marguerite "Smitty" Hensley (née Johnson). She was raised as the only child of each of her parents' second marriage and grew up on Phoenix's North Central Avenue in affluent circumstances. Dixie Lea Burd (d. 2008), the daughter of Marguerite Smith through a prior relationship, was her half-sister, as was Kathleen Hensley Portalski (d. 2017), the daughter of Jim Hensley and his first wife, Mary Jeanne Parks. Cindy Hensley was named Junior Rodeo Queen of Arizona in 1968. She attended Central High School in Phoenix, graduating in 1972.

Hensley enrolled at the University of Southern California. She joined Kappa Alpha Theta sorority as a freshman, and had many leadership roles in the house during her four years there. Hensley graduated with a Bachelor of Arts in education in 1976. She continued on at USC, and received a Master of Arts degree in special education in 1978. There she participated in a movement therapy pilot program that led the way to a standard treatment for children with severe disabilities; she published the work Movement Therapy: A Possible Approach in 1978. Declining a role in the family business, she worked for a year as a special education teacher of children with Down syndrome and other disabilities at Agua Fria High School in Avondale, Arizona.

== Marriage and family ==
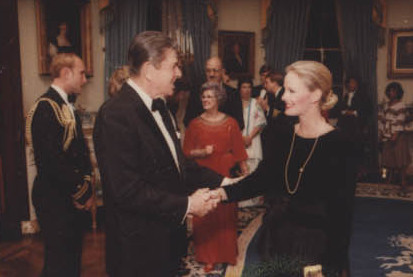
Greeting President Ronald Reagan in 1983

Hensley met John McCain in April 1979 at a military reception in Honolulu, Hawaii. He was the U.S. Navy liaison officer to the United States Senate, and was accompanying a group of senators heading for China. She was in Hawaii on a family vacation with her parents. Hensley was talking to Jill Biden, the wife of Senator Joe Biden, who suggested that she talk to McCain; her father made the introduction. He was almost 18 years her senior; by her later description, each fudged the age they said they were to the other: "He made himself younger, and I made myself older, of course."

He had been married to Carol McCain for 14 years and they had three children (two of whom he adopted from her first marriage). McCain and Hensley quickly began a relationship, traveling between Arizona and Washington to see each other. John McCain then pushed to end his marriage and the couple stopped cohabiting in January 1980, Carol McCain consented to a divorce in February 1980, it was finalized in April 1980.

Hensley and McCain were married on May 17, 1980, at the Arizona Biltmore Hotel in Phoenix. They signed a prenuptial agreement that kept most of her family's assets under her name; they kept their finances apart and filed separate income tax returns.

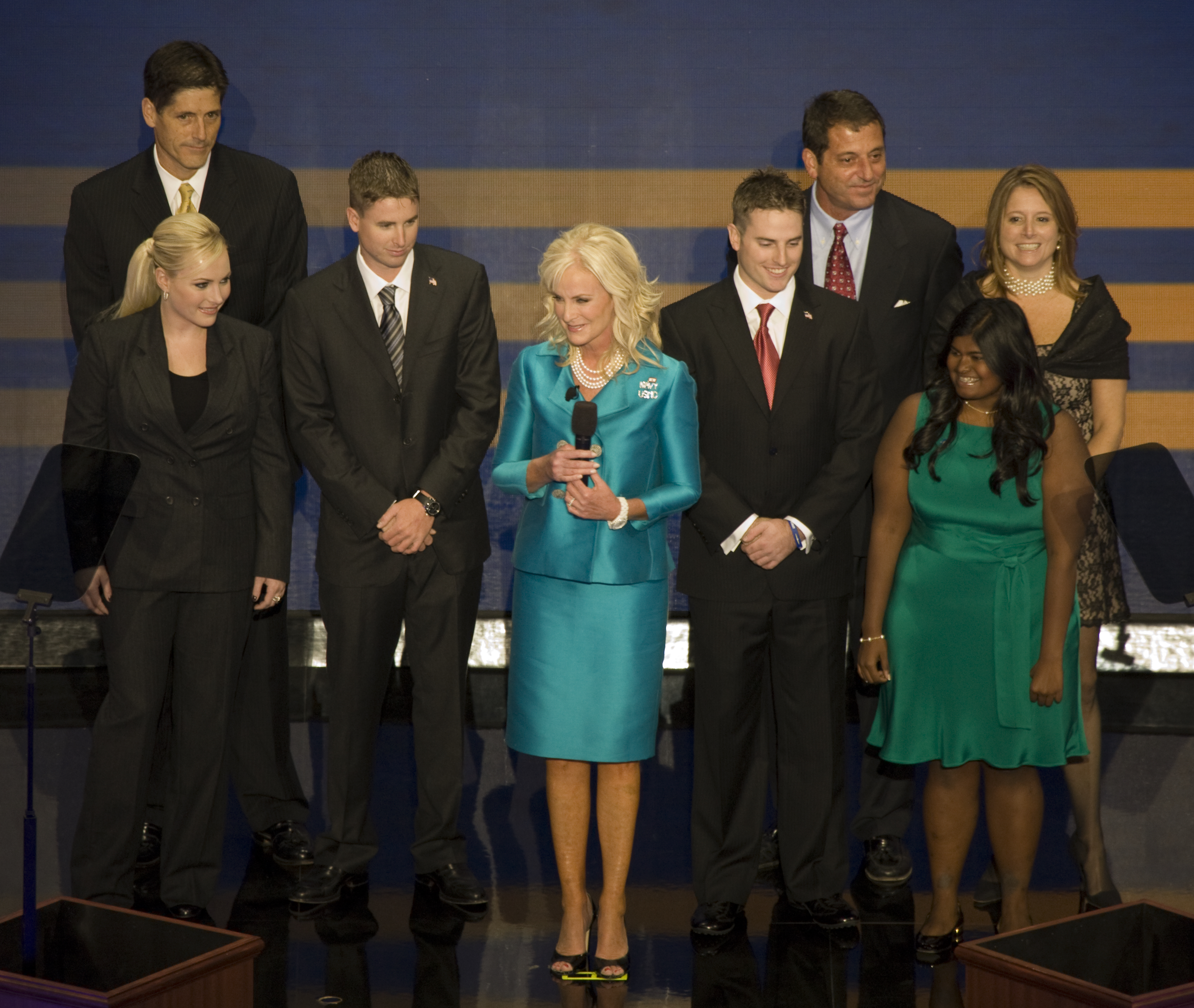
The full McCain family in 2008. In the front row are the children with Cindy: Meghan, Jimmy, Jack, and Bridget. In the back row are his children from John McCain's first marriage: Andrew, Douglas, and Sidney.

Her father's business and political contacts helped her new husband to gain a foothold in Arizona politics. She campaigned with her husband door to door during his successful first bid for U.S. Congress in 1982, and was heavily involved in campaign strategy. Her wealth from an expired trust from her parents provided significant loans to the campaign and helped it survive a period of early debt.

Once her husband was elected, the McCains moved to Alexandria, Virginia. She spent two months in late 1983 writing handwritten notes on over 4,000 Christmas cards to be sent to constituents and others. She was considered an outsider who was snubbed by the Washington congressional social scene, in part because Carol McCain was a popular figure in town, and she grew homesick for Arizona. She had several miscarriages.

She moved back to Arizona in early 1984 and gave birth to the couple's daughter Meghan later that year. She subsequently gave birth to sons John Sidney IV (known as "Jack") in 1986 and James (known as "Jimmy") in 1988. Their fourth child, Bridget, was adopted in 1991. McCain's parents lived across the street and helped her raise the children; her husband was frequently in Washington and she typically only saw him on weekends and holidays. In his absence, she organized elaborate fund-raisers for him and expanded their home.

In April 1986, McCain and her father invested $359,100 in a shopping center project with Phoenix banker Charles Keating. This, combined with her role as a bookkeeper who later had difficulty finding receipts for family trips on Keating's jet, caused complications for her husband during the Keating Five scandal, when he was being examined for his role regarding oversight of Keating's bank.

== American Voluntary Medical Team ==
=== Founding and mission ===
In 1988, inspired by a vacation that she took four years earlier to substandard medical facilities on Truk Lagoon, McCain founded the American Voluntary Medical Team (AVMT). It was a non-profit organization that organized trips for doctors, nurses and other medical personnel to provide MASH-like emergency medical care to disaster-struck or war-torn developing countries such as Micronesia, Vietnam (before relations were normalized between them and the U.S.), Kuwait (arriving five days after the conclusion of the Gulf War), Zaire (to help refugees from the Rwandan genocide), Iraq, Nicaragua, India, Bangladesh, and El Salvador. She led 55 of these missions over the next seven years, each of which were at least two weeks in duration. AVMT also supplied treatment to poor sick children around the world. In 1993, McCain and the AVMT were honored with an award from Food for the Hungry.

=== Adoption ===
In 1991, the AVMT went to Dhaka, Bangladesh, to provide assistance following the 1991 Bangladesh cyclone. While at Mother Teresa's Dhaka orphanage, the Sisters of Charity of Mother Teresa Children's Home, McCain met two infant girls she felt needed to be brought to the United States for medical treatment. She decided to adopt one of the girls, later named Bridget, with her husband readily agreeing; the adoption became final in 1993. She helped coordinate the adoption of the other little girl for family friend Wes Gullett.

=== Prescription drug addiction ===
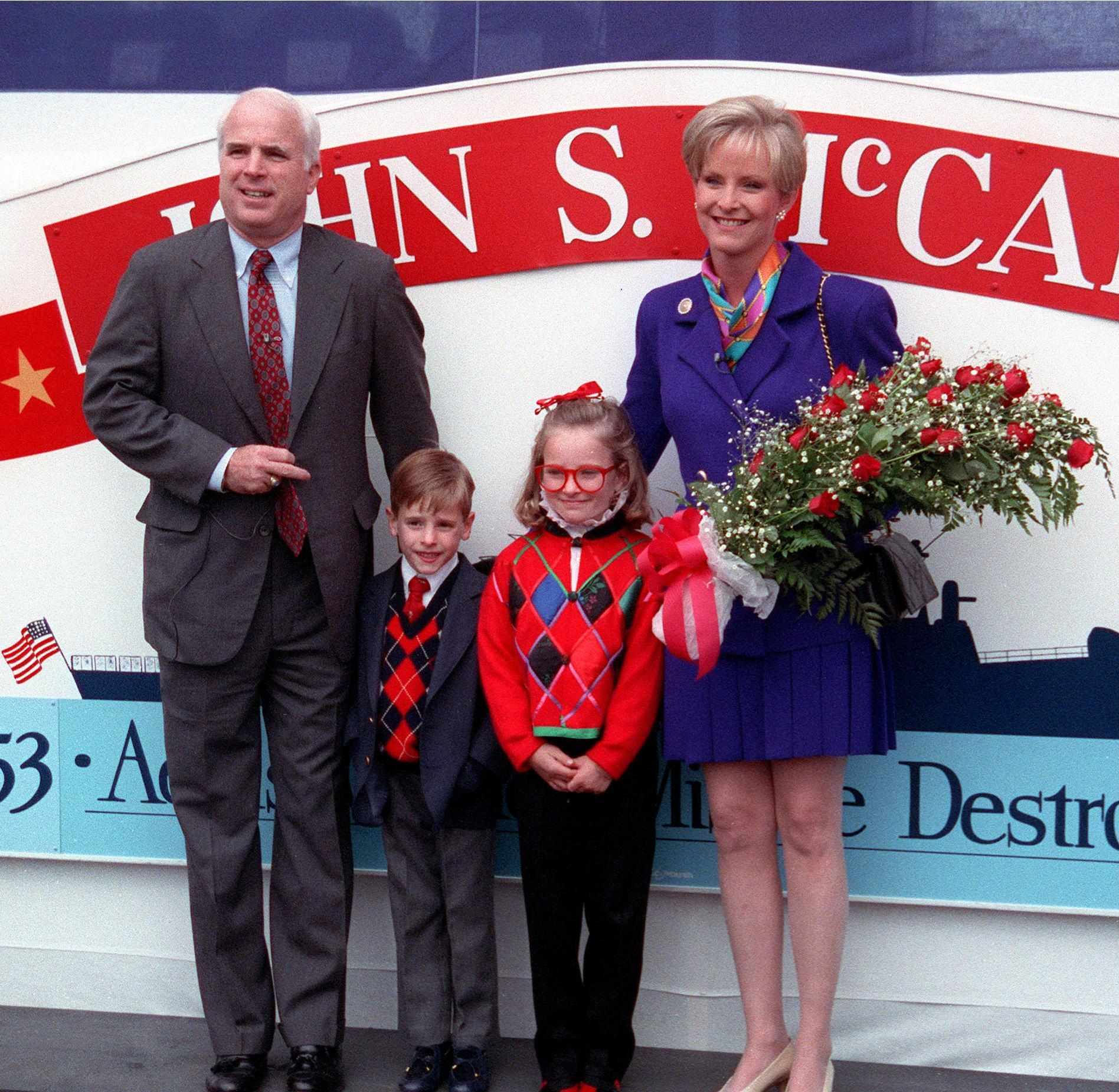
At the christening of USS John S. McCain, September 1992, with daughter Meghan, son Jack, and husband John at the Bath Iron Works shipyard, Bath, Maine.

In 1989, McCain developed an addiction to Percocet and Vicodin. She initially took the opioid painkillers to alleviate pain after two spinal surgeries for ruptured discs. She also used the drugs to ease emotional stress during the Keating Five scandal. The addiction progressed to where she was taking upwards of twenty pills a day, and she resorted to having an AVMT physician write illegal prescriptions in the names of three AVMT employees without their knowledge. In 1992, her parents staged an intervention to force her to get help; she told her husband about her problem and subsequently attended a drug treatment facility where she began outpatient sessions to begin recovery from drug addiction. In 1993, she underwent surgery, which resolved her back pain.

In January 1993, Tom Gosinski, an AVMT employee who had discovered her illegal drug use, was terminated on budgetary grounds. Subsequently, he tipped off the Drug Enforcement Administration about her prior actions and a federal investigation ensued. McCain's defense team, led by her husband's Keating Five lawyer John Dowd, secured an agreement with the U.S. Attorney's office for McCain, a first-time offender, which avoided charges while requiring her to pay financial restitution, enroll in a diversion program and do community service. Meanwhile, in early 1994, Gosinski filed a wrongful termination lawsuit against McCain, in which he alleged she ordered him to conceal "improper acts" and "misrepresent facts in a judicial proceeding;" he told her he would settle for $250,000. In response, Dowd characterized this request as blackmail, and requested Maricopa County attorney Rick Romley to investigate Gosinski for extortion. In the end, Gosinski's credibility was undermined by testimony in Romley's report from other charity staffers who asserted Gosinski privately vowed to blackmail McCain were he ever fired, and both Gosinski's lawsuit and the extortion investigation against him were dropped.

Before prosecutors were able to publicly disclose her addiction to pain medication, McCain preemptively revealed the story to reporters, stating that she was doing so willingly: "Although my conduct did not result in compromising any missions of AVMT, my actions were wrong, and I regret them ... if what I say can help just one person to face the problem, it's worthwhile."

=== Aftermath ===
AVMT concluded its activities in 1995 in the wake of the McCain prescription narcotics controversy. That year, McCain founded a new organization, the Hensley Family Foundation, which donates funds to children's programs nationally as well as in Arizona. She was largely a stay-at-home mom during the balance of the 1990s. She also held positions as vice president, director, and vice chair of Hensley & Co. In the mid-1990s, she began suffering from severe migraine headaches, for a while keeping them secret from her husband and minimizing their effect to the rest of her family. The condition frequently resulted in visits to an emergency room. Her attacks were caused by many different migraine triggers and she tried many different treatments.

== Role in 2000 presidential campaign ==
Although wary of the media and still having no love for the political world, McCain was active in her husband's eventually unsuccessful campaign for President of the United States in 2000. She mostly provided good cheer, without discussing her opinions about national policy. She impressed Republican voters with her elegance at coffee shops and other small campaign settings, where she frequently referred to her children, carpooling and charity work.

McCain was upset by the notorious smear tactics against her husband in the South Carolina primary that year. These included allegations involving her adopted daughter Bridget that she found "despicable", as well as insinuations that McCain herself was a drug addict. Though deeply wounded by the attacks for a long time, McCain eventually forgave those responsible. She was chosen as the chair of the Arizona delegation to the 2000 Republican National Convention.

== Between presidential campaigns ==
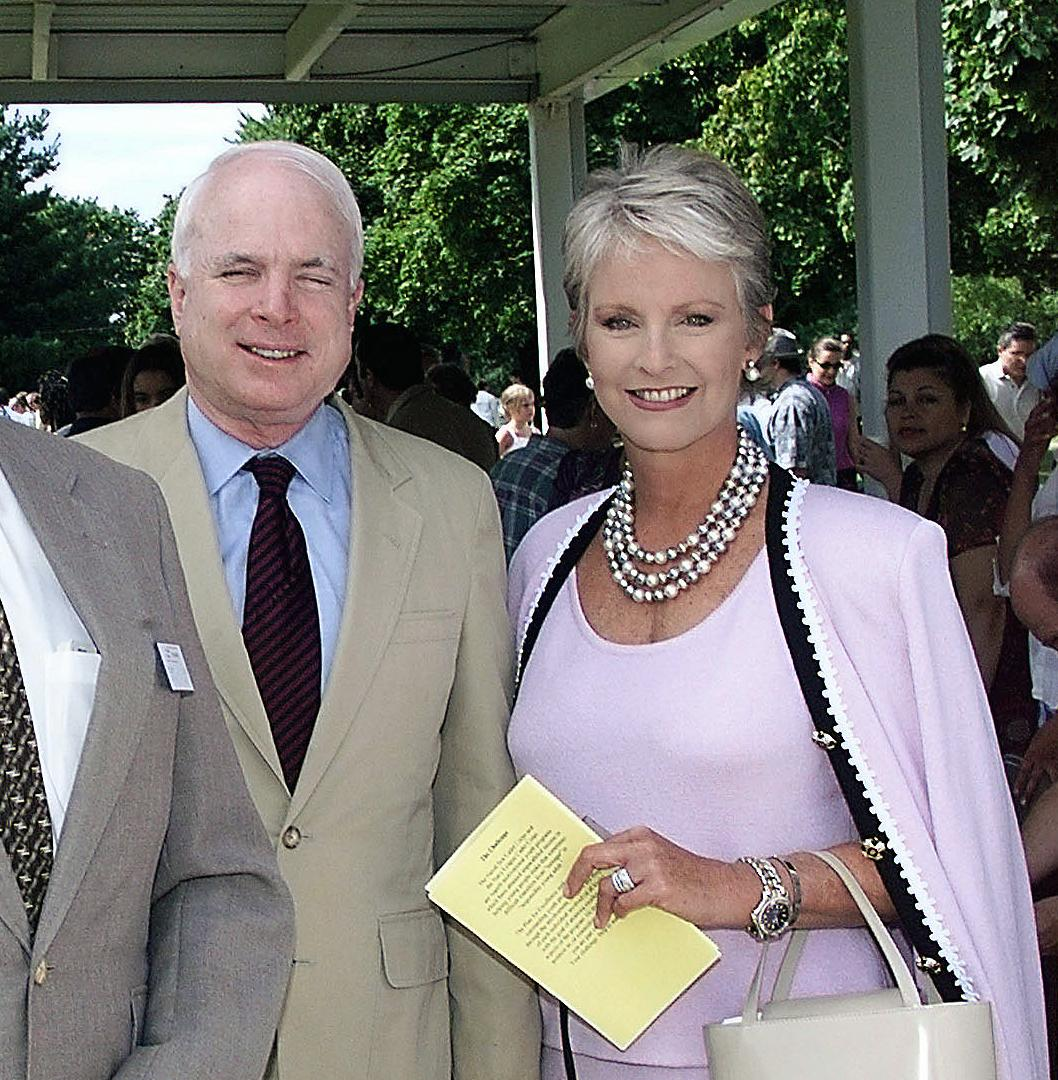
Cindy and John McCain at a Naval Sea Cadet Corps graduation, Fort Dix, New Jersey, July 2001

In 2000, she became chair of the now $300 million-a-year Hensley & Co. following her father's death. It is one of the largest Anheuser-Busch beer distributors in the United States. Together, McCain, her children, and one of John McCain's children from his first marriage own 68 percent of the company. As chair, her role takes the form of consultations with the company CEO on major initiatives such as new products, new plants or employee welfare, rather than that of an active physical presence. She does not have operational control of Hensley, and Anheuser-Busch considers her to be an absentee owner. By 2007, she had an annual income of over $400,000 from Hensley and an estimated net worth of $100 million. She also owned at least $2.7 million worth of shares of Anheuser-Busch stock. With her children, she owns a minority stake in the Arizona Diamondbacks baseball team.

McCain became actively involved with Operation Smile in 2001, taking parts in its medical missions to Morocco, Vietnam and India. She was honored by the organization in 2005 and sits on its board of directors. McCain joined the board of directors of CARE in 2005. She is on the board of the HALO Trust, and has visited operations to remove landmines in Cambodia, Sri Lanka, Mozambique, and Angola. She makes financial contributions to these organizations via her family trust and views her role as watching them in the field to ensure they are frugal and their money is being spent effectively. On occasion she has criticized foreign regimes on human rights grounds, such as Myanmar's military junta.

In April 2004, McCain had a near-fatal stroke caused by high blood pressure, although she was still able to attend some events. After several months of physical therapy to overcome leg and arm limitations, she made a mostly full recovery, although she still had some short-term memory loss and difficulties in writing. She owns a home in Coronado, California, next to the Hotel del Coronado; her family had vacationed in Coronado growing up, and she has gone there for recuperation and family get-togethers. She or her family own other residential and commercial real estate in California, Arizona and Virginia and, including rental properties, McCain herself owns ten homes and part of three office complexes. She is an amateur pilot and race car driver. After her stroke, she trained in the motorsport of drifting and precision driving.

== Role in 2008 presidential campaign ==
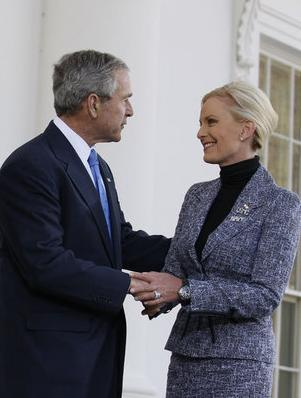
Visiting President Bush at the White House on March 5, 2008

She was active and visible in her husband's second presidential campaign during 2007 and 2008, despite not wanting her husband to run initially due to bad memories of their 2000 experience and worries the effect on her children, especially son Jimmy who was headed to serve in the Iraq War. She eventually supported her husband in his goals, but defined her own campaign roles; she frequently returned to Arizona to attend to domestic duties or interrupted campaigning for her overseas charitable work. She preferred to travel with her husband and introduce him rather than act as a campaign surrogate with a separate schedule. She wore her hair in a fashionable but severe style and was sometimes seen with an unsmiling countenance in her appearances. In August 2008, a member of the public shook her hand very vigorously, aggravating her existing carpal tunnel syndrome condition and causing her to slightly sprain her wrist. The campaign exacerbated her migraine headaches and she sometimes had to wear dark glasses to shield herself from bright lights. The pressures of the campaign also brought out a range of behaviors between her and her husband, varying from moments of great tenderness and concern to raging arguments that dismayed their staffs.

McCain stated that the American public wanted a First Lady of the United States who would tend toward a traditional role in that position. She would not attend Cabinet meetings, but would continue her involvement in overseas non-profit organizations and would urge Americans to do the same globally or locally. She envisioned herself as a possible figurehead for humanitarian work, along the lines of Diana, Princess of Wales. She continued to expand her roles in such organizations, joining in April 2008 the board of Grateful Nation Montana, which provides scholarships and services to the children of Montana service personnel killed in Iraq and Afghanistan.

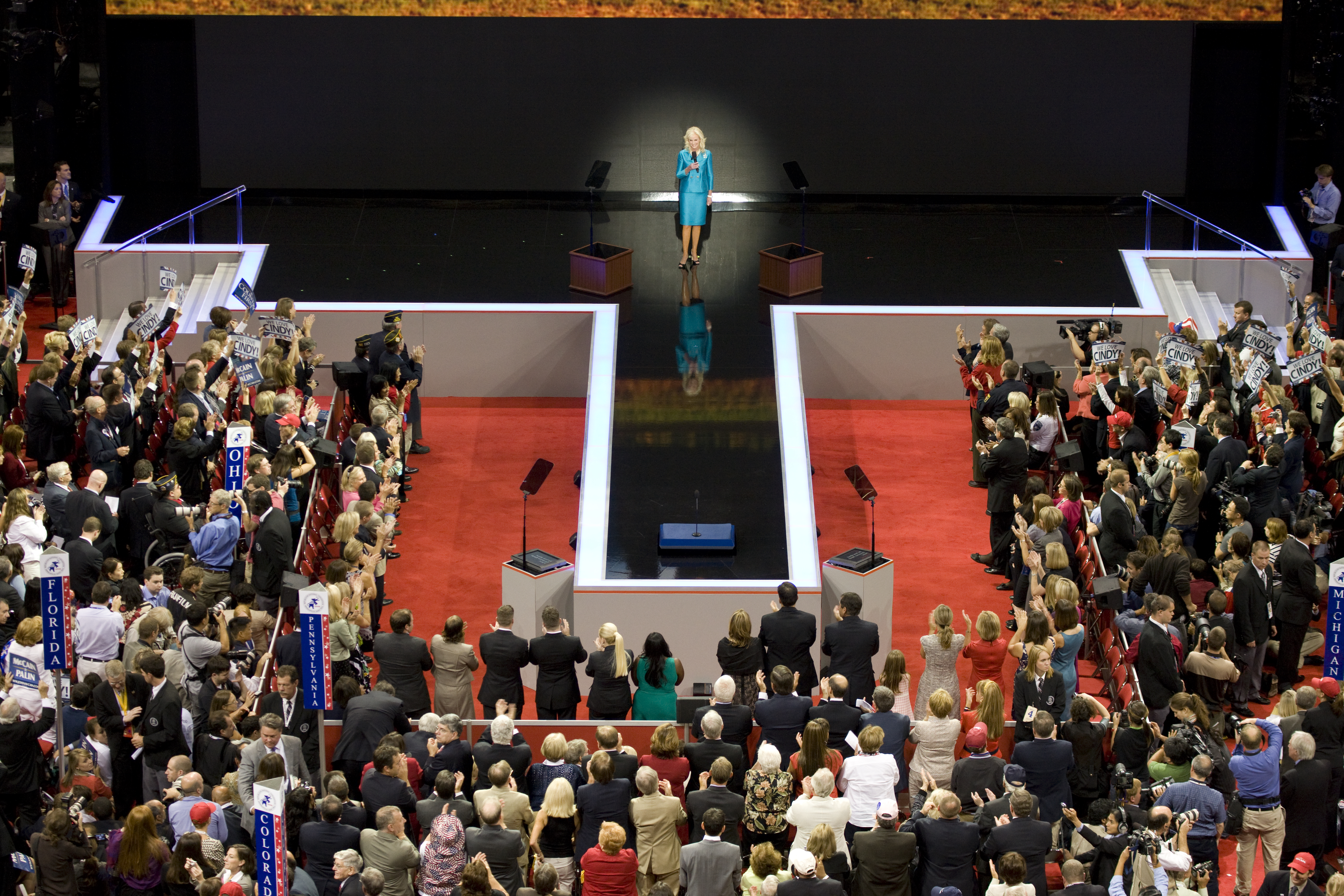
Addressing the delegates on the final night of the 2008 Republican National Convention

She made statements critical of the Bush administration for not deploying enough troops during the Iraq War. Her close examination of the financial books of the McCain campaign during the first part of 2007 convinced the candidate that its profligate spending could not go on and led to the drastic mid-year reduction of the campaign's staff and scope. In February 2008, McCain made news by being critical of Michelle Obama, the wife of Democratic presidential candidate Barack Obama, who had said, "And let me tell you something: For the first time in my adult lifetime I am really proud of my country." McCain, who was genuinely offended by the remark, replied: "I am proud of my country. I don't know about you—if you heard those words earlier—I am very proud of my country." Also in February 2008, she publicly appeared beside her husband during a press conference in response to a newspaper report regarding his connection to a lobbyist.

McCain faced media scrutiny about her wealth, spending habits, and financial obligations. She initially declined to release her separate income tax returns, saying that it was a privacy issue and she would not release the returns even if she became First Lady She later released the first two pages of her 2006 return, which showed $6 million in income for that year (including nearly $570,000 in itemized deductions and more than $1.7 million paid in federal income taxes). The campaign said that any decisions about how to handle her role in Hensley & Co. if she became First Lady would not be made until that time. While she stood to gain a considerable profit from the agreed-upon acquisition of Anheuser-Busch by the Belgian company InBev, she was initially under some political pressure to help oppose the deal and keep Anheuser-Busch under American ownership.

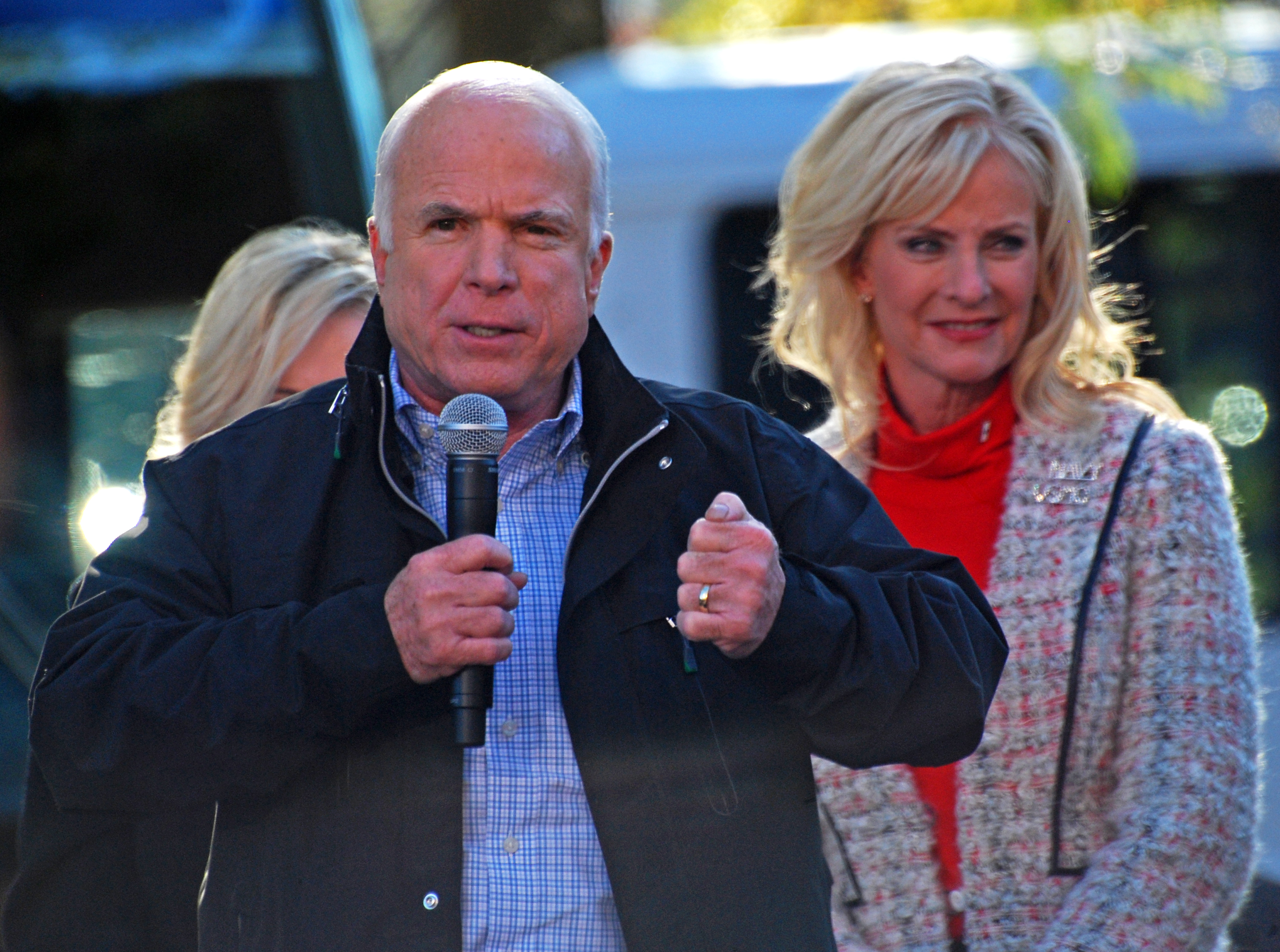
Six days before the general election loss, the McCains campaign together in Elyria, Ohio.

In June 2008, a Rasmussen Reports poll found that 49 percent of voters viewed McCain favorably and 29 percent unfavorably, while an ABC News/The Washington Post poll found figures of 39 percent and 25 percent respectively. Her style and fashion sense was the subject of much media scrutiny. McCain was compared to former first lady Nancy Reagan, due to both her style and wardrobe as well as her demeanor. Early in the campaign, some recipes attributed to McCain turned out to be copied from other sources; the campaign attributed the problem to an error by an intern.

As the spouse of presidential nominee, McCain spoke on both the opening and final nights of the early September 2008 Republican National Convention. On the first night, truncated due to national attention regarding Hurricane Gustav, she appeared with First Lady Laura Bush to deliver short remarks encouraging support for hurricane relief efforts along the Gulf Coast, and on the last night, she introduced the seven McCain children and spoke about how her husband's love for his country had been passed on to them. In October 2008, she increased the intensity of her public remarks against Obama's candidacy, speaking with surprising vitriol in accusing the Obama campaign of being the dirtiest in history and saying of his position against a war-funding bill, "The day that Senator Obama cast a vote not to fund my son when he was serving sent a cold chill through my body." The stresses of the campaign caused the 5-foot-7-inch (1.70 m) McCain's weight to fall under 100 pounds (45 kg). On November 4, 2008, she fought back tears in an appearance as the McCain campaign reached its final day and subsequent loss to Obama.

== Post-2008 election activities ==
After the election, McCain was approached about appearing on Dancing with the Stars. She seriously considered participating, but according to her husband, was concerned that her surgically replaced knee would not be able to withstand the rigors of the competition.

Continuing her humanitarian aid work with a January 2009 trip to Dubai, India, and Cambodia, she said that she was relieved that the campaign was over and that, while it had been "wild and nuts" at times, it had also been "a remarkable experience to be a contender for the highest office in the land." She said the ongoing global economic crisis was adversely affecting humanitarian organizations, and she expressed hope that President Obama would be successful in dealing with it.

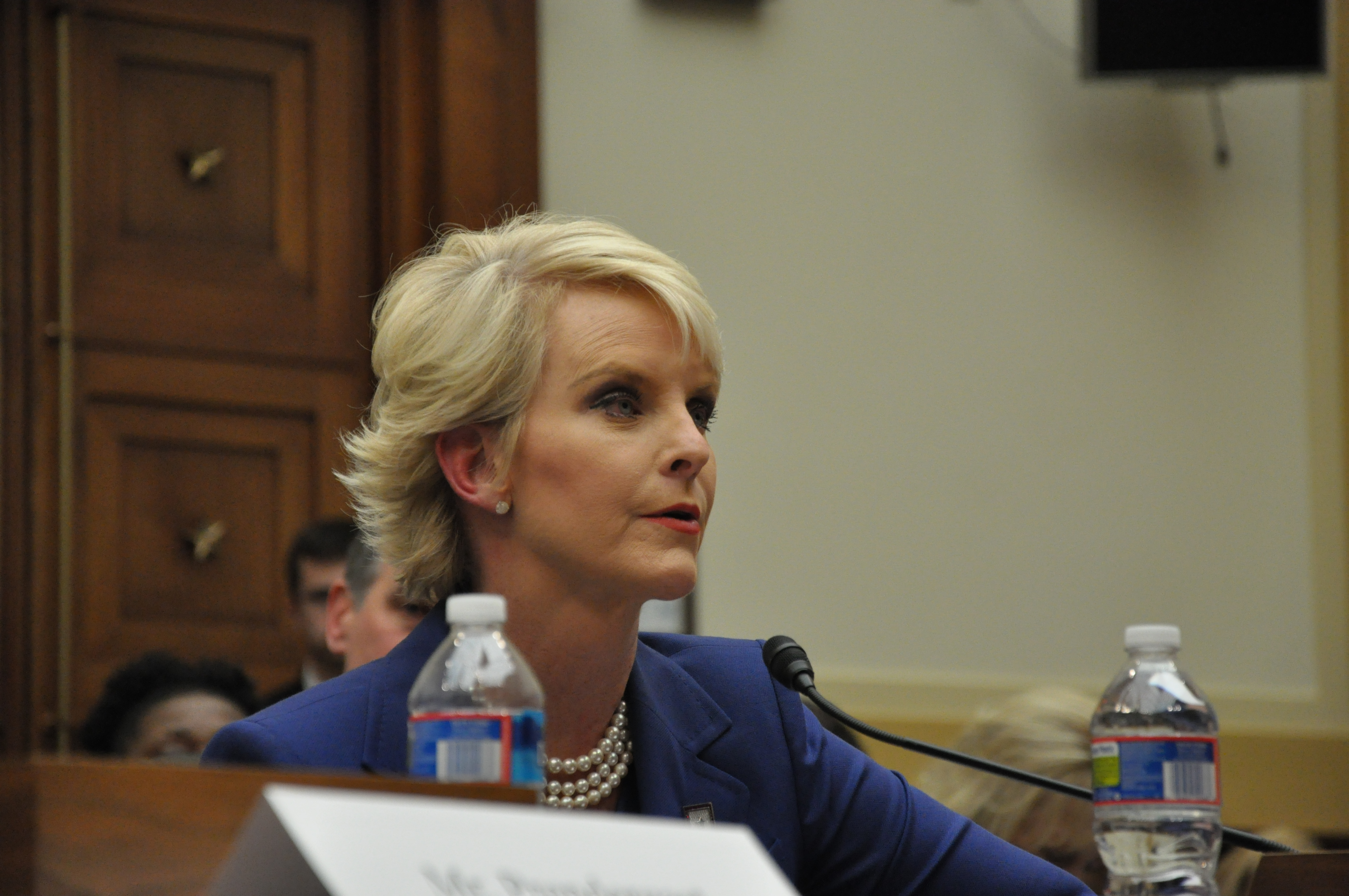
McCain testifying before Congress in March 2011

She expressed support for LGBT rights by appearing alongside her daughter Meghan at an April 2009 convention of the Log Cabin Republicans, and posing for the NOH8 Campaign, a gay rights project opposed to California Proposition 8, a ballot measure banning same-sex marriage. The following year she appeared in another NOH8 public service announcement against bullying, and in it appeared to break with her husband's position and express support for repeal of the "Don't ask, don't tell" policy prohibiting gays from serving openly in the U.S. military. However, she subsequently tweeted that "I fully support the NOH8 campaign and all it stands for and am proud to be a part of it. But I stand by my husband's stance on DADT."

In September 2009, she spoke about her migraines publicly for the first time and decided to speak at the International Headache Congress about raising awareness for others with the condition. During her husband's eventually successful 2010 senatorial re-election campaign, she rarely made public appearances.

McCain appeared in March 2011 alongside Eastern Congo Initiative founder Ben Affleck to testify before a panel of the House Foreign Affairs Committee on behalf of continued monetary assistance to the Democratic Republic of Congo, in an environment where the Republican-controlled House was looking to make significant cuts to foreign aid. She has noted the difficulty of getting attention to some of the topics she feels most strongly about; at a Futures Without Violence summit in 2012, she said, "When I talk about rape in Congo, people turn their backs and run, especially the men."

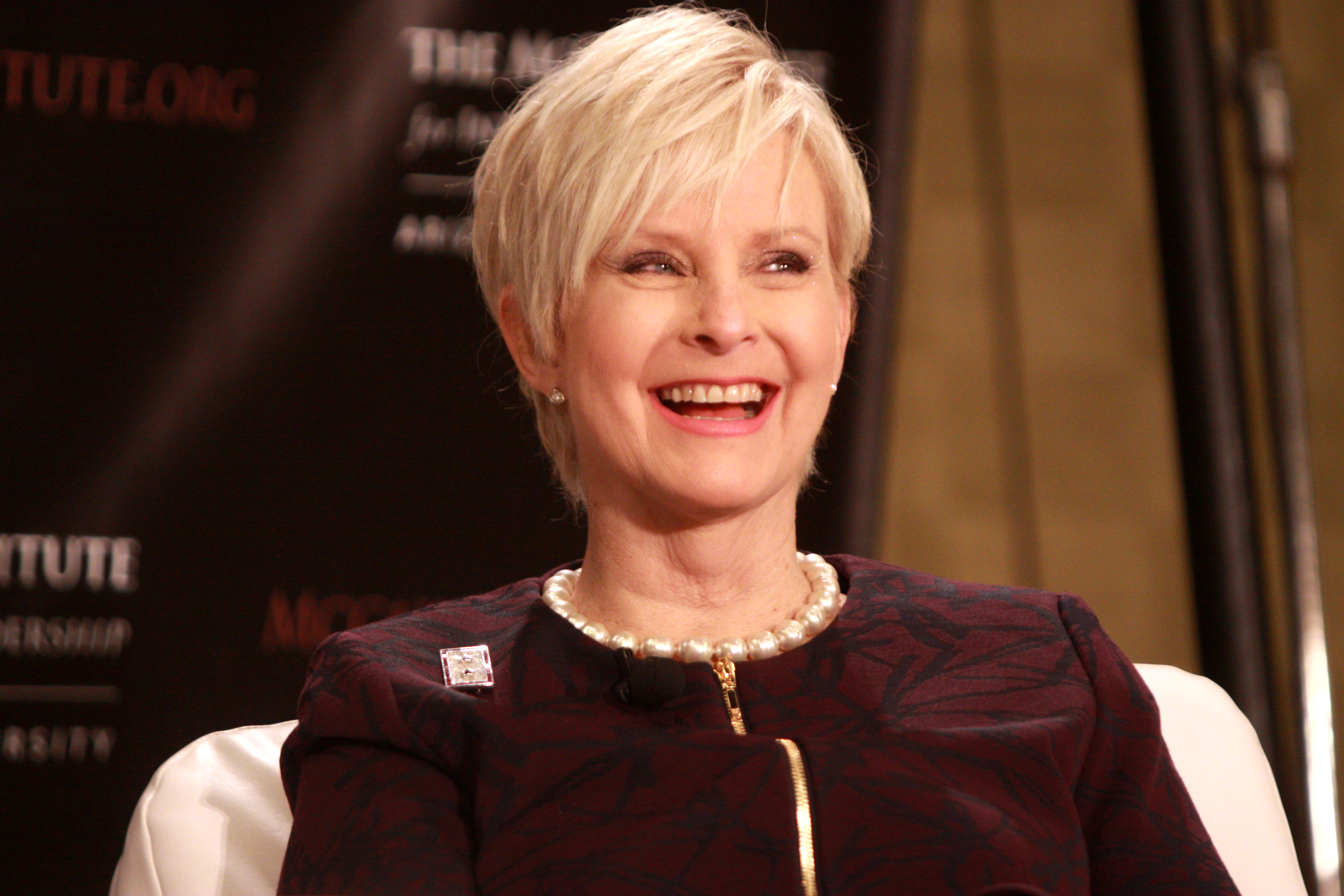
McCain speaking at an event at The McCain Institute in November 2013

In late 2013 and early 2014, McCain used the occasion of Super Bowl XLVIII to highlight her concerns about sex trafficking in the United States, an issue that she had begun working on in conjunction with The McCain Institute. She campaigned for legislation to address the problem at both the federal and state levels. She also served as co-chair of the Arizona Governor Jan Brewer's Task Force on Human Trafficking.

In April 2015, during the Sedona Forum, McCain and actress Demi Moore discussed ways to end sex trafficking. Later in that year she staged appearances with Heidi Heitkamp, Democratic Senator from North Dakota, to discuss human trafficking in that state and elsewhere. She said of trafficking, "Everybody has seen it; they just didn't know what they were looking at." She praised Obama and Congress for passage of the Justice for Victims of Trafficking Act of 2015 and, together with Malika Saada Saar, executive director of the Human Rights Project for Girls, started the No Such Thing Campaign to end the use of the term "child prostitute", saying "there are only victims and survivors of child rape."

During the 2016 United States presidential election, McCain and her husband ended up not voting for the Republican nominee in the wake of the Access Hollywood controversy. Nonetheless, following the change in administration in Washington, in May 2017 it was reported that McCain was under consideration for a prominent role at the U.S. Department of State, possibly focusing on issues related to human trafficking. In June 2017, there were further reports that after extensive recruiting by President Trump following a recommendation from Ivanka Trump, she had agreed to become an Ambassador-at-Large dealing with matters of human trafficking, refugees, and humanitarian aid. But no announcement ever came along the lines of this report.

== Husband's illness and death ==
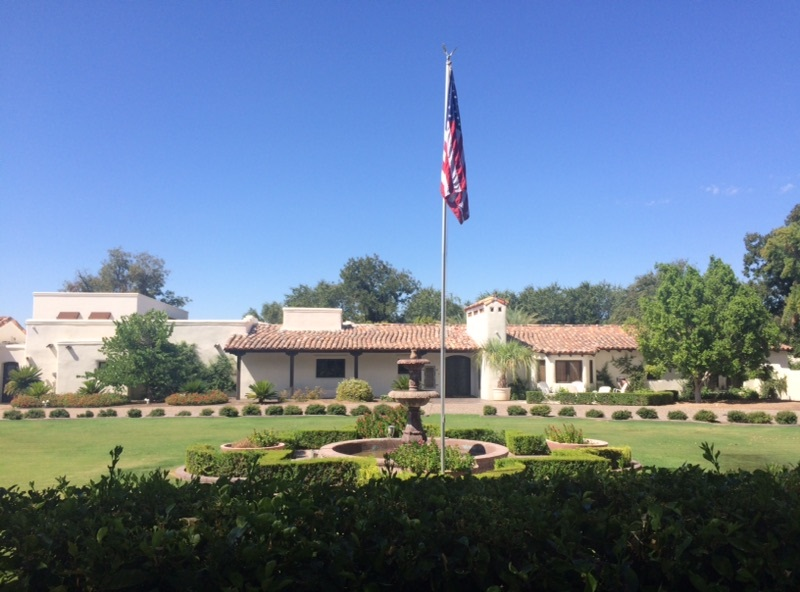
The John and Cindy McCain residence in Phoenix, Arizona

In July 2017, her husband was diagnosed with a glioblastoma, an aggressive brain tumor. She issued a public statement saying that, "We as a family will face the next hurdle together. One thing I do know is he is the toughest person I know. He is my hero and I love him with all my heart." Senator McCain underwent treatment, and after December 2017 no longer went to Washington, D.C., remaining in Arizona.

The severity of her husband's illness led to the possibility that he would not be able to finish his term in office and that the Governor of Arizona would have to appoint a successor until a special election could be held. There is a tradition in such situations for politically involved spouses to be named as replacements, a practice known as "widow's succession". The possibility became an issue in the 2018 Arizona gubernatorial election, where in the Republican primary contest incumbent governor Doug Ducey was trying to fend off a challenge from former Secretary of State of Arizona Ken Bennett. In May 2018, some media reports stated that Ducey was planning on naming McCain if the seat became vacant. To this, Bennett, who was seeking to capitalize on the dissatisfaction that some conservatives in the state had long had with the long-time senator, stated, "I promise I will not appoint Cindy McCain to US Senate as Gov of AZ." For his part, Ducey refused to publicly speak about the possibility.

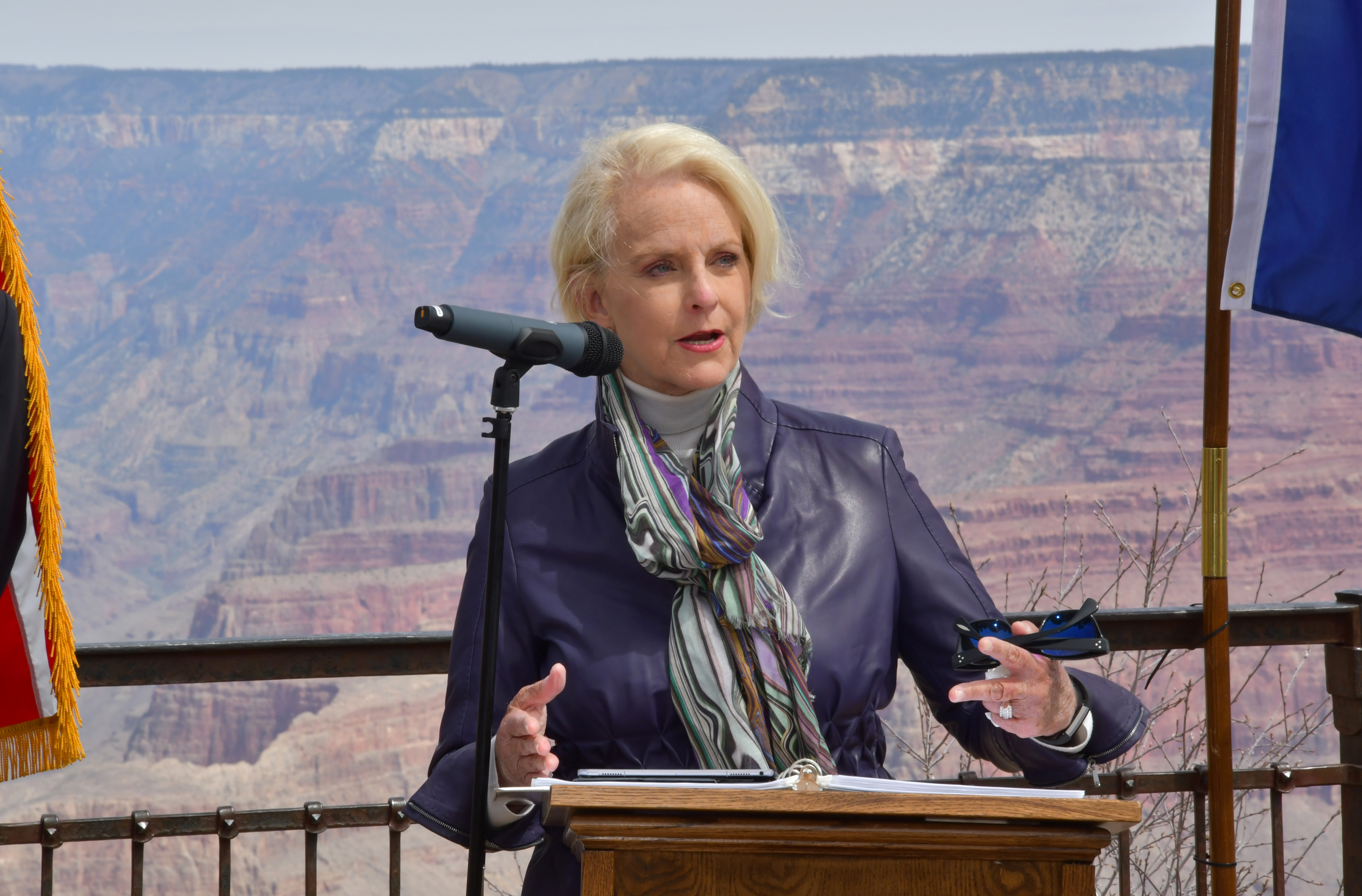
Accepting an award on her husband's behalf in April 2018 at Grand Canyon National Park

By 2018, McCain's net worth was estimated to be at least $200 million, with most of it still due to her share of Hensley & Co. In addition the couple owned properties in Phoenix, Sedona, the San Diego area, and in Virginia, although some properties were sold off in 2017.

McCain's attitude towards President Trump took another negative turn in February 2018, following repeated public criticism by the chief executive of her husband's nay vote that had doomed the so-called "Skinny repeal" effort to dismantle Obamacare. McCain said: "I think the president fails to understand this, but more importantly, in my own – from my own feeling, we need more compassion, we need more empathy, we need more togetherness in terms of working together. We don't need more bullying, and I'm tired of it." In July 2018 McCain issued a public statement one year after her husband's initial prognosis, saying that "Though this diagnosis has brought many challenges, our hearts are nevertheless filled with gratitude" towards caregivers, colleagues, and friends.

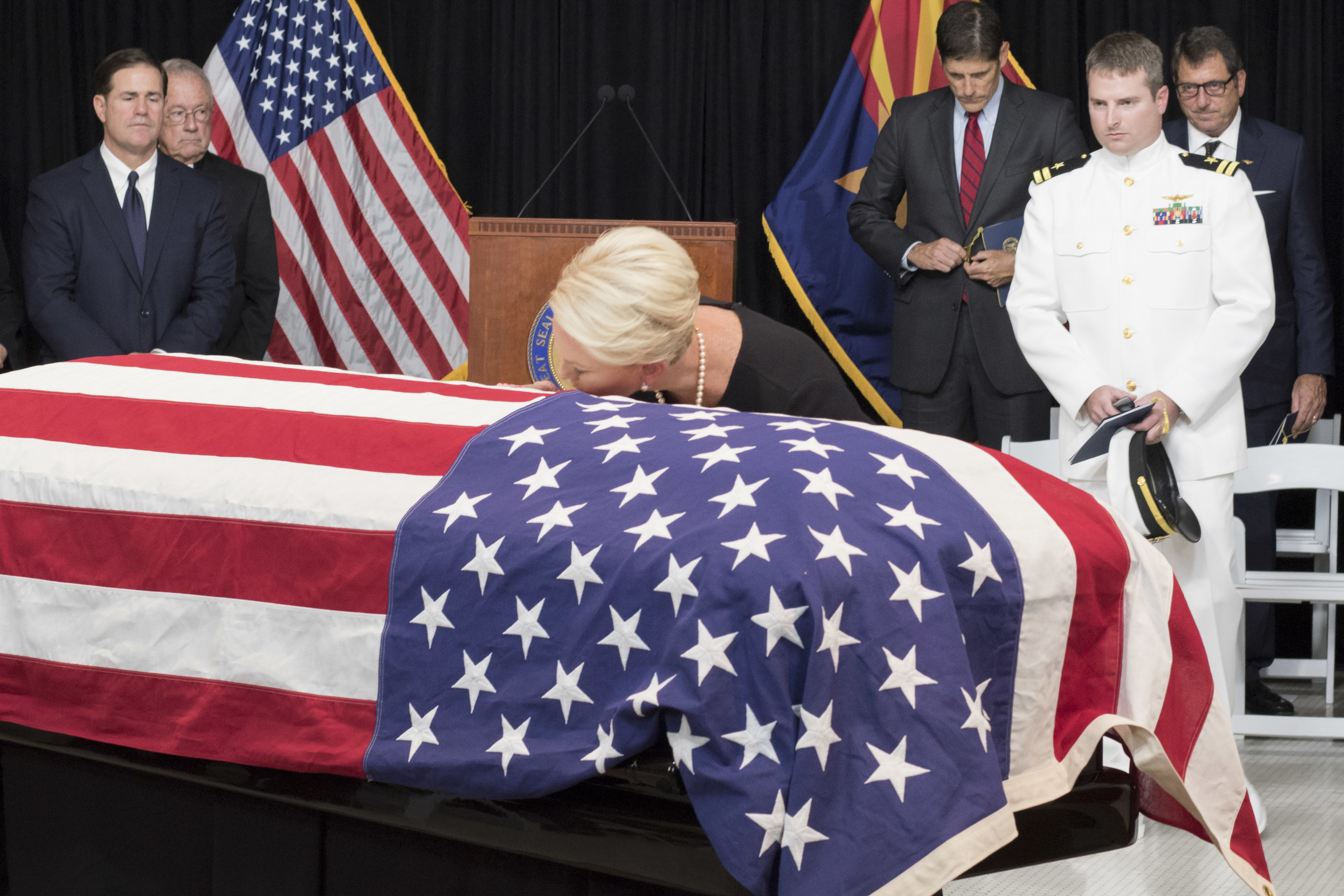
McCain mourns over her husband's casket as he lies in state at the Arizona State Capitol.

John McCain died at age 81 on August 25, 2018. She was present at, and later expressed gratitude for, the elaborate services for her husband, which involved lying in state in the rotunda at the Arizona State Capitol, a service at the North Phoenix Baptist Church, lying in state in the United States Capitol rotunda in Washington, a service at the Washington National Cathedral, and finally burial at the United States Naval Academy Cemetery.

Once it became time, McCain reportedly indicated that she was not interested in being appointed to her husband's Senate seat, as personal participation in electoral politics did not appeal to her. As one former aide stated, "It is a mistake to understand the McCains as a political family. They're a military family first and a political family second." Nonetheless, she still wielded some influence in terms of who would be picked. On September 4, Ducey – who had by this time easily won the Republican gubernatorial primary – appointed former Arizona senator Jon Kyl to the seat, in a choice that was satisfactory to all factions within the state Republican party. McCain referred to Kyl as "a dear friend of mine and John's. It's a great tribute to John that he is prepared to go back into public service to help the state of Arizona."

== Role in 2020 presidential campaign ==
Following her husband's death, McCain moved back to her childhood neighborhood. She became chair of the McCain Institute's board of trustees. She also joined the family's #ActsofCivility campaign, with the aim of encouraging people to interact with those they disagree with.

In February 2019, she faced backlash after making claims on KTAR-FM that she saw human trafficking at Phoenix Sky Harbor International Airport. Police rejected her claims, stating that there was "no evidence of criminal conduct or child endangerment". She later apologized in a tweet and praised police officers.

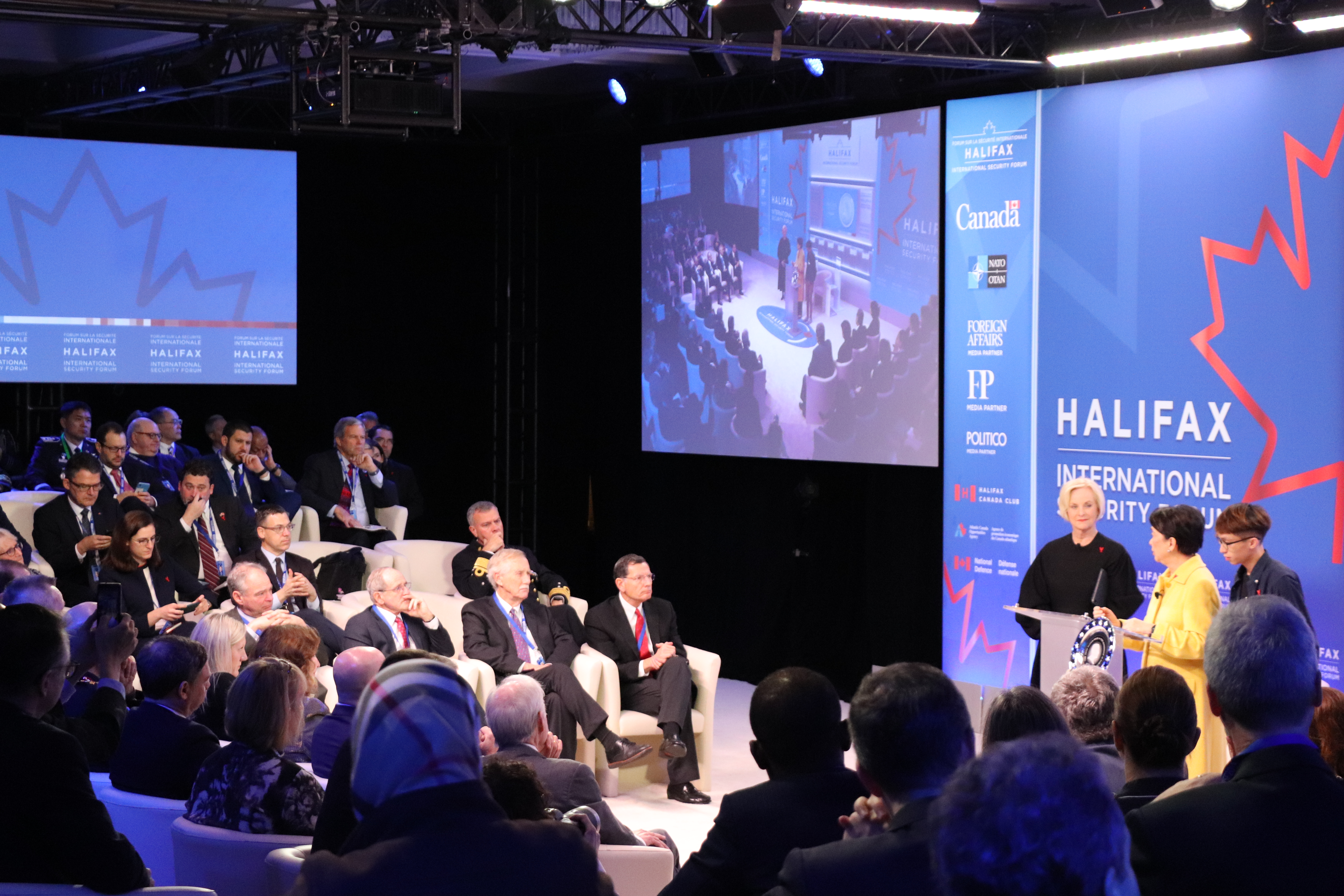
McCain giving a prize at the Halifax International Security Forum, 2019

She continued to be critical of the state of American politics. In September 2019, she declaimed the Republican Party as "excluding people for the wrong reasons" and said it was no longer "the party that my husband and I belonged to." In contrast, with the 2020 United States presidential election underway, she praised Democratic presidential front-runner Joe Biden and his wife Jill Biden, saying that they were good friends to her and that "Joe has been a remarkable source of inspiration, kindness and just a shoulder throughout all of this." In June 2020, McCain stated that she would not endorse Donald Trump's re-election campaign. While not explicitly endorsing Biden at the time, McCain spoke in a video segment shown at the August 2020 Democratic National Convention about the friendship between her late husband and Biden. On September 22, McCain gave her full endorsement to Biden's presidential candidacy. McCain's endorsement, and the publicly poor relationship between Trump and her late husband, has been given as one of a number of reasons why Biden was able to narrowly win the 2020 United States presidential election in Arizona. In doing so Biden became the first Democratic presidential candidate since 1996, and only the second since 1948, to win the state.

McCain was a member of the advisory board of the Biden-Harris Transition Team, which was helping to plan for the presidential transition of Joe Biden, providing counsel on women's and children's issues. She was named to the board in September 2020, when the campaign was still underway. Nonetheless, she has said that she is still a registered Republican, intends to stay that way, and hopes that the Republican Party returns to stances that she can once again support.

In January 2021, McCain was censured by the Maricopa County Republican Party by a 4–1 margin in response to her support for Biden. In response, McCain tweeted that she would "continue to support candidates who put country over party and stand for the rule of law." Later that month, on a resolution that passed by a wide margin, McCain was censured by the Arizona Republican Party for her support of Biden and for "leftist causes such as gay marriage and growth of the administrative state". Making reference to the fact that the state party was in the habit of censuring other members deemed insufficiently conservative, including her husband several years prior, she replied, "It is a high honor to be included in a group of Arizonans who have served our state and our nation so well ... and who, like my late husband John, have been censured by the AZGOP. I'll wear this as a badge of honor."

External videos
- After Words interview with Cindy McCain on Stronger, May 1, 2021, C-SPAN

McCain's account of her life with, and final days of, John McCain was published in April 2021. Titled Stronger: Courage, Hope, and Humor in My Life with John McCain and published by Crown Forum, it also contained material on the struggles she faced in her own life.

== United States Ambassador ==
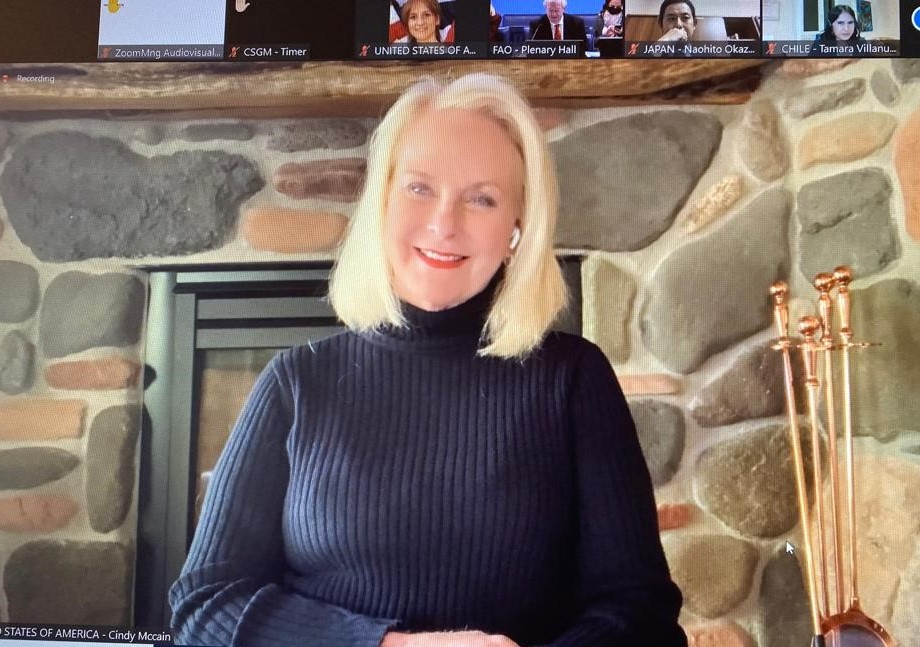
Ambassador McCain delivering the United States' opening remarks by Zoom at the Food and Agriculture Organization Council meeting, Rome, November 2021

McCain was seen by the Biden administration as a likely, or even a "must do", for an ambassadorship nomination. In late November 2020, the possible post of United States Ambassador to the United Kingdom was mentioned in connection to her. She responded to the notion of any potential nomination by saying, "In whatever way he sees fit, I would be proud and honored to serve".

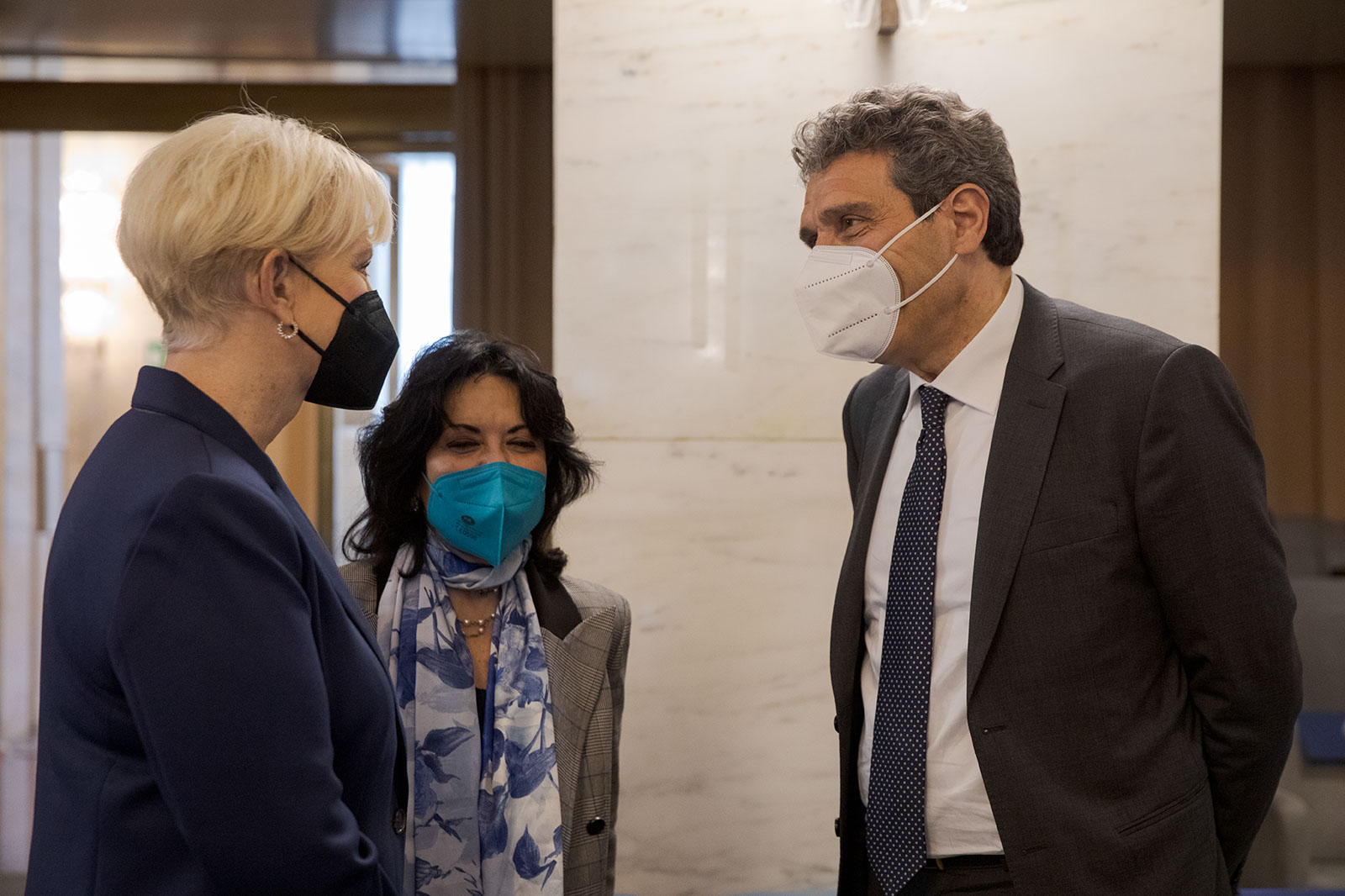
Ambassador McCain meeting Fabio Cassese, Director-General for Development Cooperation, Ministry of Foreign Affairs and International Cooperation, Italy, in Rome in April 2022

In late May 2021, it was reported that President Biden would nominate McCain to serve as the Ambassador to the United Nations Agencies for Food and Agriculture. While McCain had a long record of work in other humanitarian activities, this was her first involvement with the issues surrounding food policy. The White House officially announced her nomination on June 23, 2021. On August 9, 2021, her nomination was sent to the United States Senate. On September 28, 2021, her confirmation hearing was held by the Senate Foreign Relations Committee; she faced largely friendly questions mixed in with personal reminiscences from the committee members regarding times spent with either McCain or her husband. The committee favorably reported her nomination on October 19, 2021. The full Senate confirmed her by voice vote on October 26, 2021.

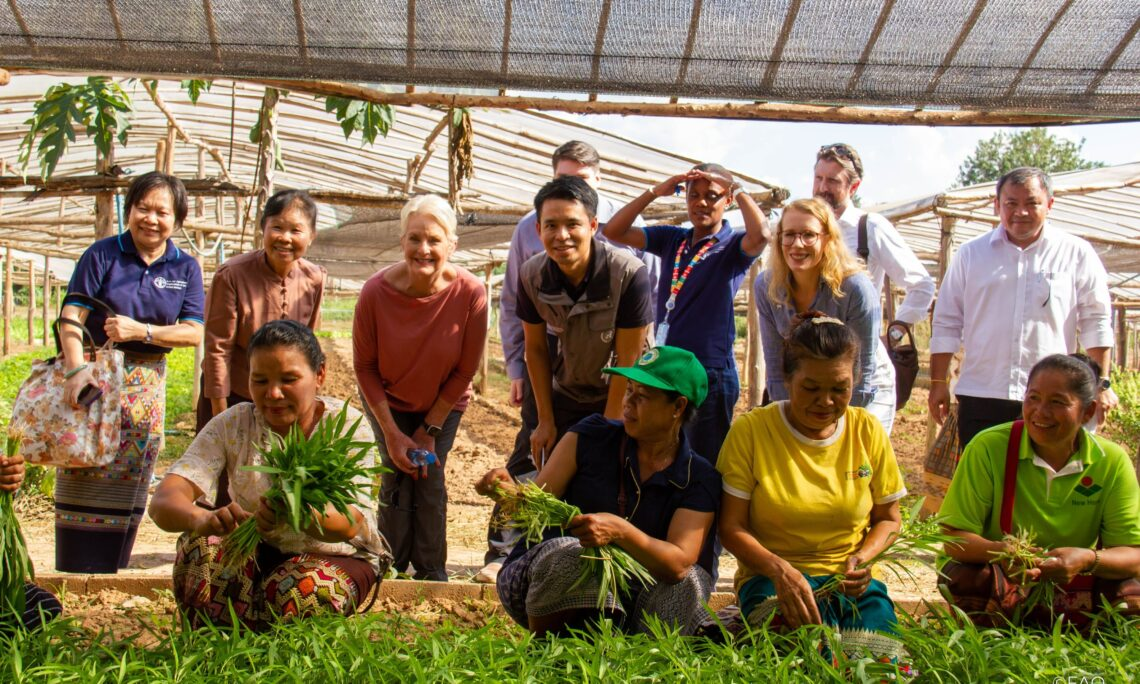
Ambassador McCain in Laos, December 2022

She was sworn in as ambassador on November 5, 2021. She presented her credentials to the UN Food and Agriculture Organization on January 18, 2022, to the International Fund for Agricultural Development on January 25, 2022, and to the UN World Food Programme on January 28, 2022.

A main focus of her time as ambassador was dealing with the 2022–2023 food crises. Much of the emergency stemmed from the 2022 Russian invasion of Ukraine, including the factor that about half of all grains delivered to the UN World Food Programme came from Ukraine. The invasion took place shortly after her tenure began, and she was part of a group of administration officials, include U.S. Secretary of State Tony Blinken, that met regularly to discuss how to keep the emergency from destabilizing areas of the world already on the edge of famine. In late March 2022, she traveled to the Poland–Ukraine border to witness first-hand the refugee situation as well as to visit a food warehouse in Rzeszów.

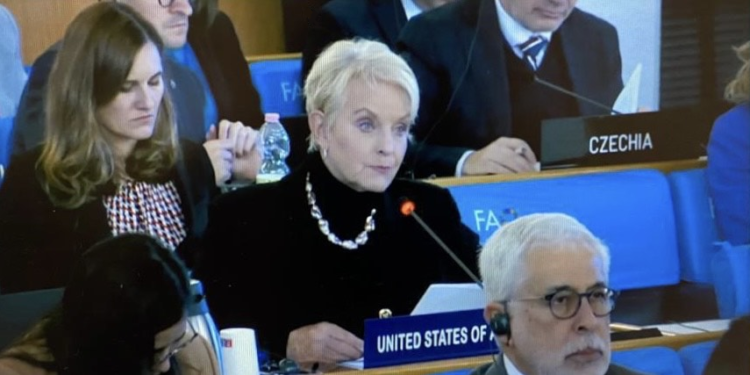
Ambassador McCain at a December 2022 meeting of the FAO in Rome, where she spoke about the effects of the war in Ukraine on global food security

In January 2023, McCain said that the crisis continued to be enormous, especially in Africa, and overall represented "the worst food crisis, the worst humanitarian crisis since World War II." She placed much of the blame on Russia, but also pointed to there still being effects on food from the COVID-19 pandemic as well as from food speculators and the effects of climate change on agriculture.

== Executive Director of the World Food Programme ==
Cindy McCain was appointed on March 2, 2023, as the new Executive Director of the U.N. World Food Programme by United Nations Secretary-General António Guterres and Food and Agriculture Organization Director-General Qu Dongyu. McCain succeeded David Beasley, who had served six years as executive director when his term ended on April 4, 2023.

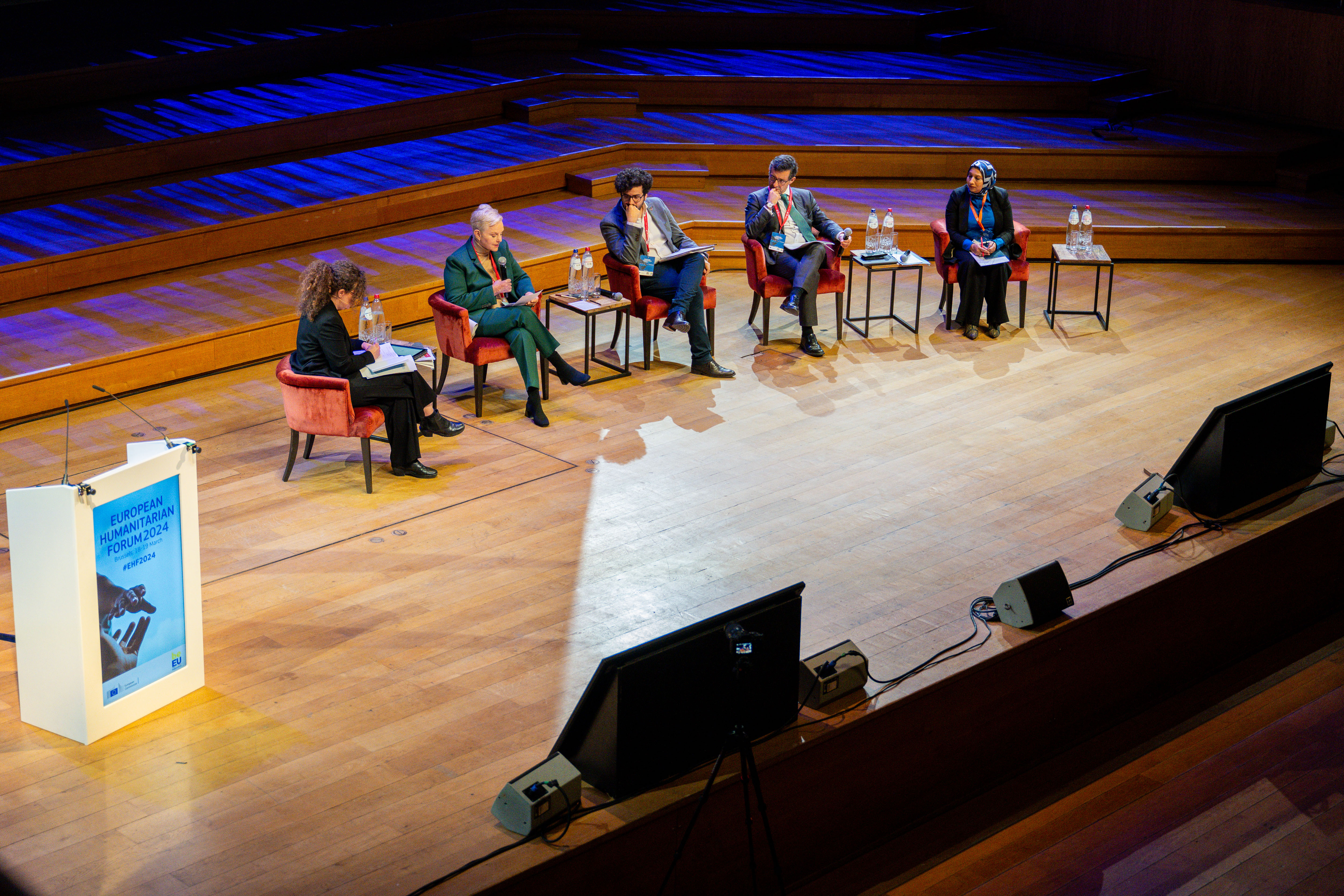
Executive Director McCain (second from left) appearing at the European Humanitarian Forum in Brussels in March 2024

On October 22, 2023, McCain warned that the 2023 Israeli blockade of the Gaza Strip could cause a humanitarian catastrophe. As the food insecurity crisis in the Gaza Strip worsened towards the end of 2023, many staff members at the World Food Programme expressed unhappiness with McCain for not having used her position to more forcefully argue on behalf of Palestinian civilians. Following the deadly World Central Kitchen aid convoy attack by Israel in May 2024, McCain said she was "shocked" and "heartbroken", that aid workers needed unfettered access to areas within Gaza, and that "This attack on our humanitarian community is unacceptable." In a May 2024 appearance on Meet the Press, McCain said that from what her organization was observing on the ground, there was a "full-blown famine" in parts of Gaza.

Nonetheless, McCain said that other areas of the world were also focal points of her attention, especially acute food insecurities in Sudan as well as in other parts of Africa and in Haiti.

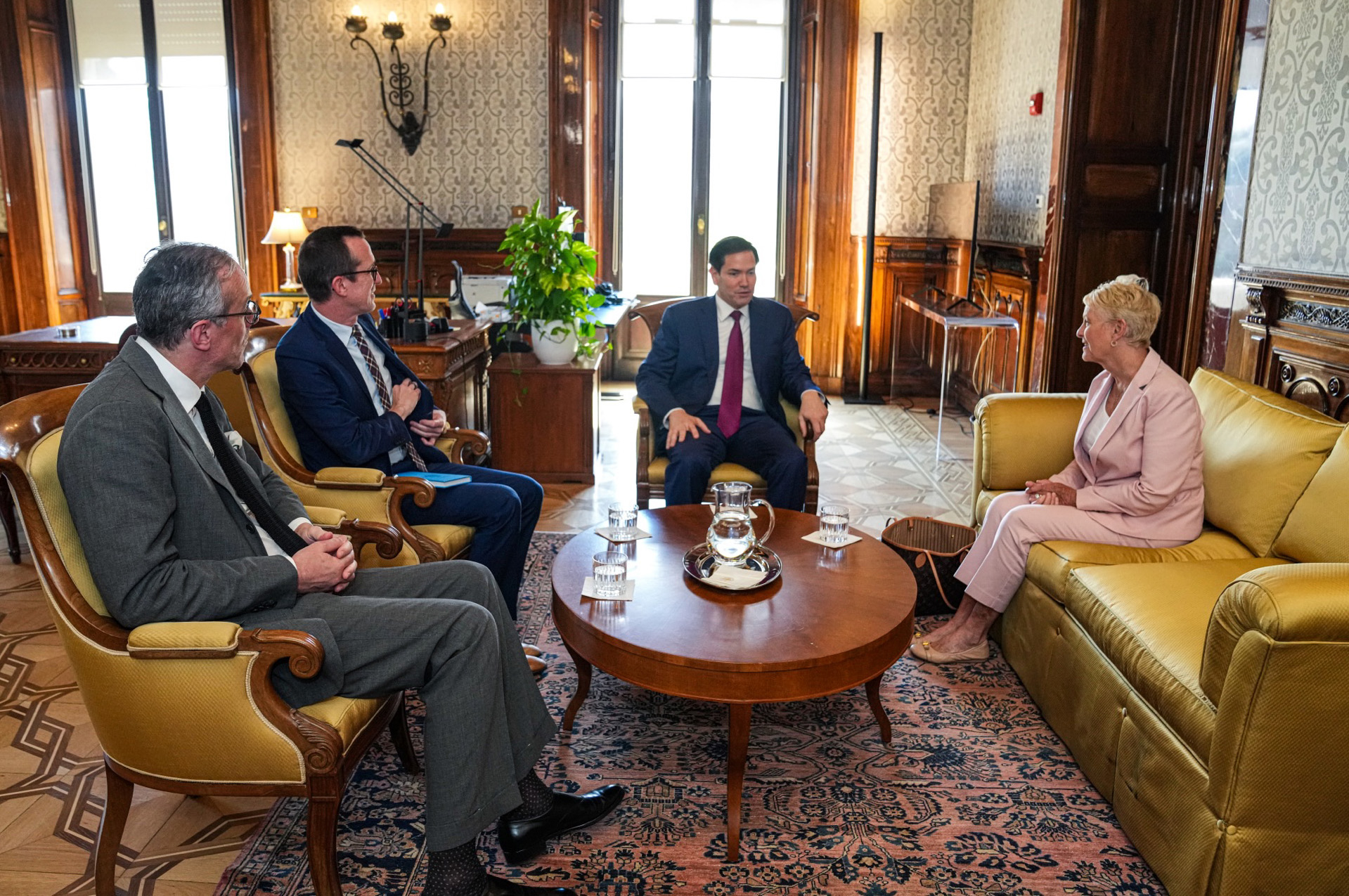
Executive Director McCain meeting with U.S. Secretary of State Marco Rubio in Rome, May 2025

The Gaza war continued, and with the collapse of the January 2025 Gaza war ceasefire in March of that year, Israel imposed a total blockade including the disallowing of any humanitarian aid. The Integrated Food Security Phase Classification for Gaza was raised to level 5, the highest on its scale, and in early May, McCain said that "It's imperative that the international community acts urgently to get aid flowing into Gaza again. If we wait until after a famine is confirmed, it will already be too late for many people." During a visit to Rome that month, U.S. Secretary of State Marco Rubio met with McCain and she outlined to him how their deliveries would work were the blockade to be eased. International pressure became strong enough to induce Israel to start allowing some aid through. However, McCain said in late May that only one-sixth of the cease-fire-period amount of aid was being allowed in and that it was "a drop in the bucket."

Meanwhile, the foreign aid slashings of DOGE and the rest of the 47th presidency resulted in fewer donations to the World Food Programme by the United States. Other nations did not fill the void, and the budget crisis and resultant service reductions at the organization continued into 2026.

In October 2025, McCain went on leave from the World Food Programme after suffering a mild stroke. Following several weeks of recuperation, she returned to the role in early January 2026. However, in February 2026 she announced with regret that, due to her health, she would be stepping down from the position. Her departure date was expected to be around May 2026. She called the role "the honor of a lifetime" and received praise for her efforts from both Republicans and Democrats in Congress.

== Awards and honors ==
McCain was inducted into the Arizona Women's Hall of Fame in 2019. She also received the 2020 Heritage Award from the Arizona Chamber of Commerce and Industry. McCain received two honorary degrees in May 2019—one from her alma mater, USC, and the other from George Washington University.

Diplomatic posts
Preceded by Kip E. Tom	United States Ambassador to the United Nations Agencies for Food and Agriculture; 2021–2023	Succeeded by Jeffrey Prescott
Preceded by David Beasley	Executive Director of the World Food Programme; 2023–2026; On leave: 2025–2026	Succeeded by Carl Skau; Acting
