= List of ambassadors of the United States to the United Nations Agencies for Food and Agriculture =

Ambassador of the United States to the United Nations Agencies for Food and Agriculture
- Seal of the United States Department of State

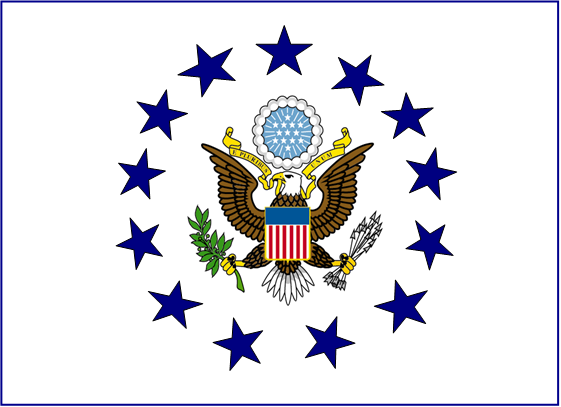
- Flag of a United States chief of mission

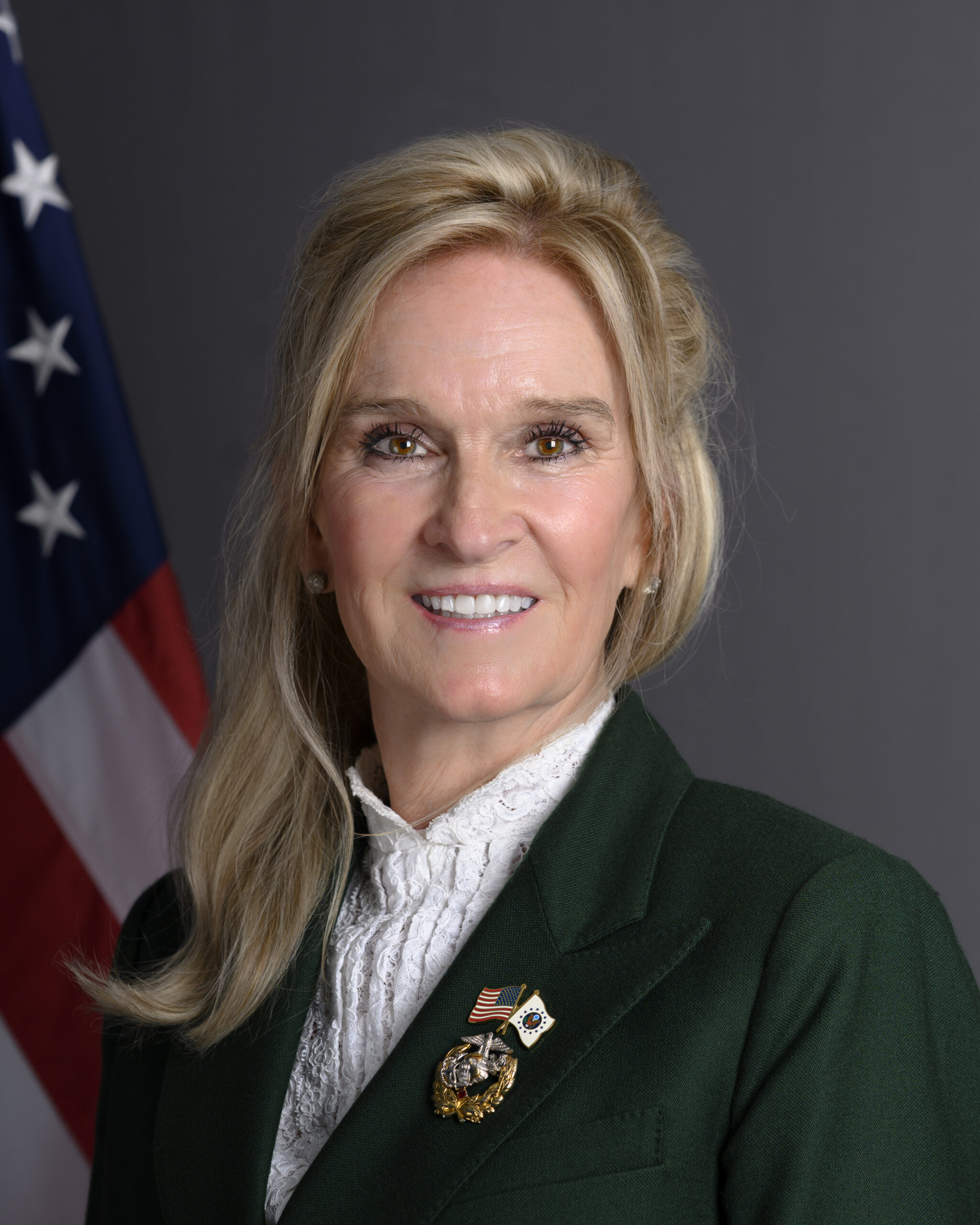
- Incumbent; Lynda Blanchard since November 10, 2025
- Nominator: President of the United States
- Inaugural holder: Millicent Fenwick as Ambassador Extraordinary and Plenipotentiary
- Formation: June 13, 1983
- Website: United States Mission – UN Agencies in Rome

The United States representative to the United Nations Agencies for Food and Agriculture is the head of the United States Mission to the UN Agencies in Rome and holds the rank of Ambassador to the three United Nations agencies for food and agriculture located in Rome, Italy: the Food and Agriculture Organization, the International Fund for Agricultural Development, and the World Food Programme.

== History ==
Originally, there had been a U.S. permanent representative to the Food and Agriculture Organization. However, this position had not held ambassador rank, but instead had been part of the Embassy of the United States of America to the Italian Republic and had reported to the United States ambassador to Italy. In 1983, President Ronald Reagan created the United States Mission to the UN Agencies in Rome and split out this role to a separate, ambassador-rank position. (Due to its heritage, the new position has occasionally been known as the United States ambassador to the Food and Agriculture Organization of the United Nations.) As with regular ambassadorial posts, nominations are made by the President of the United States and confirmation by the United States Senate is required. As head of the mission, the ambassador oversees staff from the U.S. Department of State, U.S. Department of Agriculture, and the Agency for International Development.

The U.S. Mission to the UN Agencies in Rome is a part of the "Tri-Mission Community" in Rome, along with the Embassy of the United States of America to the Italian Republic (headed by the United States ambassador to Italy) and the Embassy of the United States to the Holy See (the United States ambassador to the Holy See position was also split out and elevated to ambassador rank at the same time as the UN Agencies one was). The three ambassadors sometimes engage in joint activities.

Ambassadors to the United Nations Agencies for Food and Agriculture are typically appointed for three-year terms. The position has attracted some well-known Americans: Millicent Fenwick, the first to hold it at the ambassador rank, was a nationally prominent former member of the U.S. House of Representatives; George McGovern was a former United States Senator and the 1972 Democratic Party presidential nominee; Tony P. Hall was a long-time sitting member of the House who resigned his seat in order to take on the role; and Cindy McCain was a politically active humanitarian who achieved further visibility as the wife and then widow of a senator and presidential nominee. Several of the nominees, especially including McGovern and Hall, had long prior involvements with food, agriculture, and hunger issues.

On the other hand, from 1988 through 1997 the position was held by career Foreign Service Officers. During 2017–18 the position was vacant, one of many unfilled by the new administration. During such times the acting personage is the Chargé d'affaires a.i., who in this case was Thomas M. Duffy. Then in 2019, a nominee was finally confirmed for the post.

== Ambassadors ==
The following is a chronological list of those who have held the position since its elevation in rank, with what are typically their appointment and termination of service dates:

1. Millicent Fenwick (June 13, 1983 – March 20, 1987)
2. Fred J. Eckert (May 7, 1987 – January 11, 1989)
3. Gerald J. Monroe (November 8, 1988 – July 5, 1992)
4. William H. Marsh (July 24, 1992 – September 4, 1994)
5. Thomas Austin Forbord (August 23, 1994 – September 8, 1997)
6. George McGovern (March 10, 1998 – September 28, 2001)
7. Tony P. Hall (September 12, 2002 – April 5, 2006)
8. Gaddi Vasquez (September 7, 2006 – January 17, 2009)
9. Ertharin Cousin (August 17, 2009 – April 5, 2012)
10. David J. Lane (July 19, 2012 – August 9, 2016)
11. Kip E. Tom (May 22, 2019 – January 19, 2021)
12. Cindy McCain (November 5, 2021 – April 5, 2023)
13. Jeffrey Prescott (April 3, 2024 - January 20, 2025)
14. Lynda Blanchard (November 10, 2025 - Present)
