= David J. Lane (ambassador) =

American diplomat (born c. 1960)

David Lane
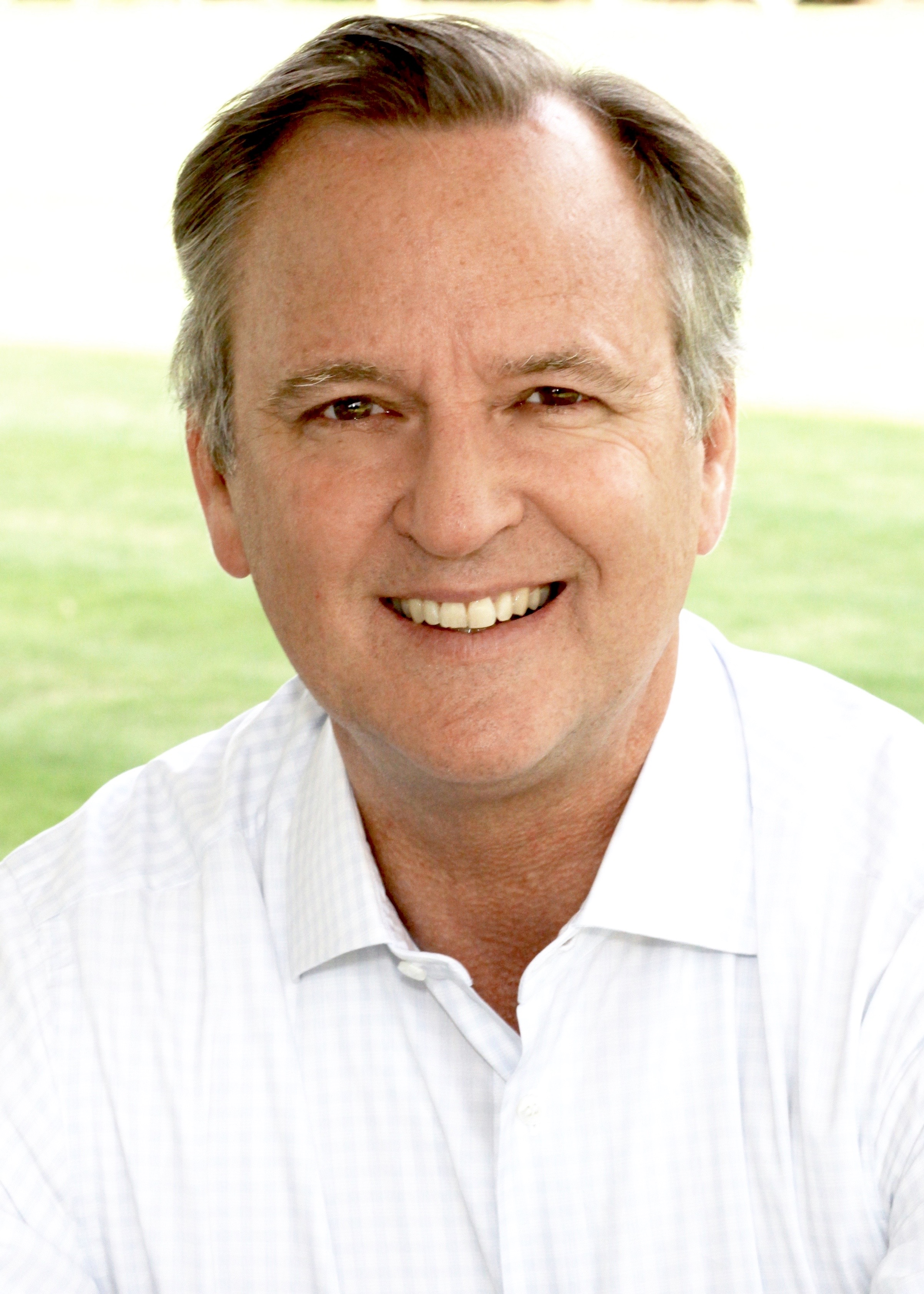

United States Ambassador to the United Nations Agencies for Food and Agriculture
- In office July 19, 2012 – August 9, 2016
- President: Barack Obama
- Preceded by: Ertharin Cousin
- Succeeded by: Kip E. Tom (2019)

Personal details
- Born: 1960 (age 65–66)
- Party: Democratic
- Education: University of Virginia (BA); Princeton University (MPA)

David J. Lane (born c. 1960) was named president of the Annenberg Foundation Trust in September 2016. The non-profit organization operates the Annenberg Retreat at Sunnylands in Rancho Mirage, California. Lane is chairman of The Stimson Center.

Previously, Lane was United States Ambassador to the United Nations Agencies for Food and Agriculture, serving in Rome, Italy, and chief of the United States Mission to the UN Agencies in Rome. Before that he held several positions in the U.S. federal government and with philanthropic organizations, including being President and Chief Executive Officer of the ONE Campaign.

== Early life and education ==
Lane was born c. 1960. Lane grew up in Indialantic, Florida, and graduated from nearby Melbourne High School in 1978. He received a Bachelor of Arts degree from the University of Virginia, and then a Master of Public Affairs from Princeton University's Woodrow Wilson School of Public and International Affairs.

== Early career ==
Lane worked as a legislative assistant focusing in the area of foreign policy in the United States Congress for Senator Gary Hart.

== Clinton administration ==
From 1993 to 2000, Lane worked for the U.S. federal government during the Clinton administration. These included being Chief of Staff to the United States Secretary of Commerce, William M. Daley, and Executive Director of the National Economic Council.

== Philanthropic work ==
In 2001, Lane was hired by the Bill & Melinda Gates Foundation, as part of expanding its presence in Washington, D.C., and maturing as a philanthropic organization. Lane served as Director of Public Policy and External Affairs, Director of Foundation Advocacy, and Director of the East Coast Office for the foundation, where he had responsibility for that organization's advocacy and public policy work on a range of matters that included global development and global health. He was a Gates Foundation representative to Bono's DATA organization that focused on problems in Africa.

In 2007, DATA merged into the ONE Campaign, and Lane was named as president and chief executive of the latter. He emphasized the organization's purpose in fighting global extreme poverty and disease and urged leading countries to continue their commitment to bettering Africa, even during the 2008 financial crisis.

Lane also served as vice-chair of the board of Transparency International USA, and is a member of the Council on Foreign Relations.

== Obama administration ==
In early 2011, Lane joined the Obama administration during a period of staff change, serving as Assistant to the President of the United States and Counselor to the Chief of Staff in the White House, once again working for William M. Daley.

== U.S. Ambassador ==
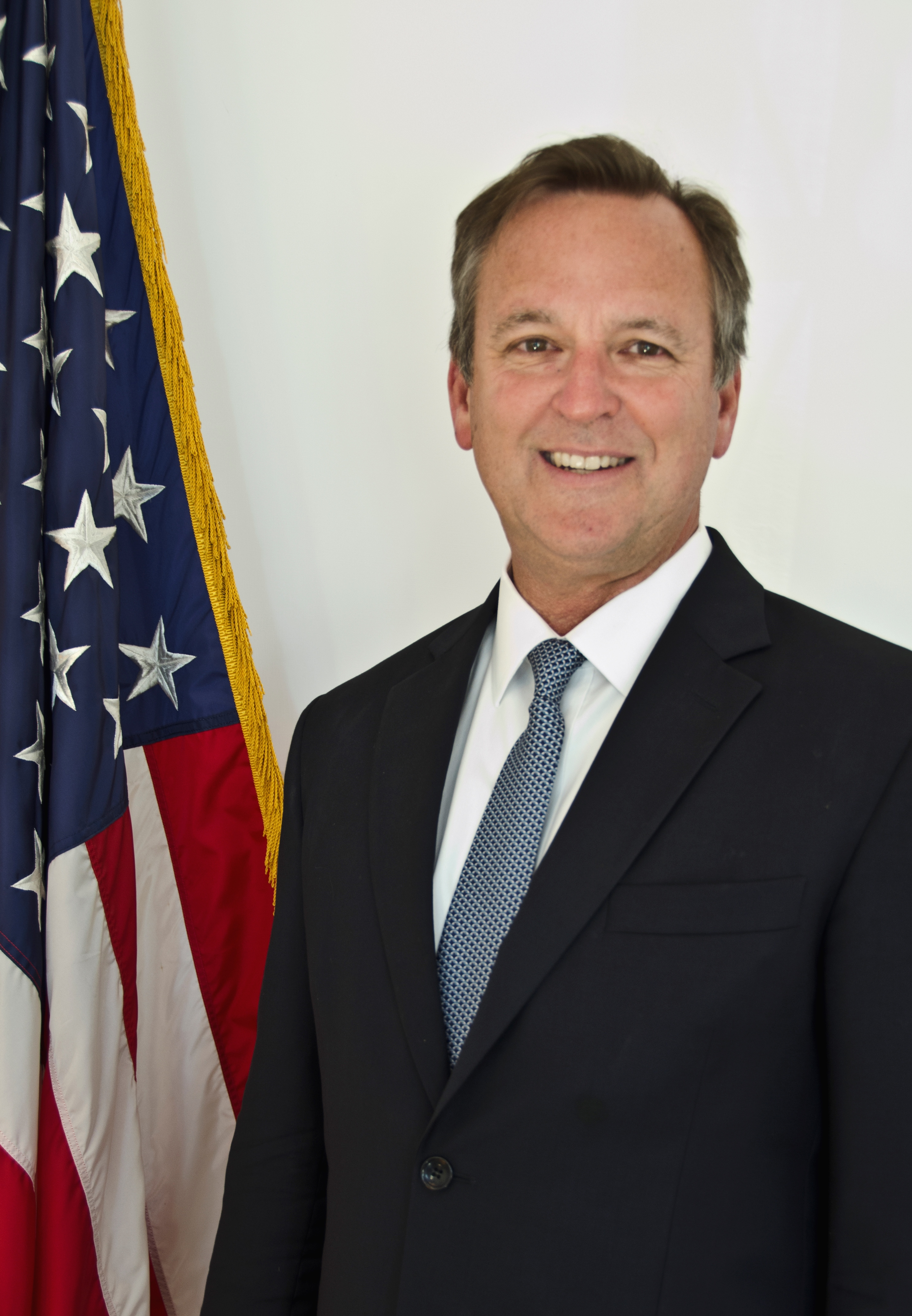
Ambassador Lane in 2014

Lane was nominated by President Barack Obama on April 16, 2012, to serve as United States Ambassador to the United Nations Agencies for Food and Agriculture. The United States Senate confirmed Ambassador Lane on May 24, 2012. He was officially sworn into the position on July 19, 2012.

During his time as Ambassador Lane coordinated strategies among six different agencies. He acted as a champion of the Feed the Future Initiative.

He returned to the United States on August 9, 2016.

== President of Sunnylands ==
Upon accepting the Annenberg position in September 2016, Lane said, "Sunnylands seems to me, especially at a time when our system so desperately needs a reset, to have the potential to bring people together across ideological boundaries."

== Sources ==
Diplomatic posts
Preceded by Ertharin Cousin	United States Ambassador to the United Nations Agencies for Food and Agriculture; 2012–2016	Succeeded by Thomas Duffy; Acting
