= William H. Marsh (diplomat) =

American diplomat

William Harrison Marsh

2nd United States Ambassador to the United Nations Agencies for Food and Agriculture
- In office July 24, 1992 – September 4, 1994
- President: George H. W. Bush; Bill Clinton
- Preceded by: Gerald J. Monroe
- Succeeded by: Thomas Austin Forbord

Personal details
- Born: 1931 Pennsylvania, U.S.
- Died: September 26, 2017 (aged 85–86) Mitchellville, Maryland, U.S.
- Education: Princeton's Woodrow Wilson School

William Harrison Marsh (1931, Pennsylvania–September 26, 2017, Mitchellville, MD) was the United States Ambassador to the United Nations Agencies for Food and Agriculture from July 24, 1992, until September 4, 1994.

Marsh graduated from Cornell University in 1953 with a degree in government and an MPA in 1957 from Princeton's Woodrow Wilson School after spending two years in the Air Force.
