= David Lane (rugby union) =

Irish rugby union player

- Born: 30 September 1913 Cork, Ireland
- Died: 15 September 1955 (aged 41) Sheffield, England
- School: CBC Cork
- University: University College Cork

Rugby union career
- Position: Three quarter
International career
Years	Team	Apps	(Points)
1934–35	Ireland	4	(0)

David Lane (30 September 1913 – 15 September 1955) was an Irish international rugby union player.

Lane picked up rugby as a pupil at Christian Brothers College, Cork.

A three quarter, Lane was most often used as a centre in his matches for Cork Constitution and University College Cork, while his opportunities to represent Ireland came on the wing. He was capped twice for Ireland in 1934, before gaining a further two caps in their championship winning 1935 Home Nations campaign.

== See also ==
- List of Ireland national rugby union players
