= David Campbell Lane =

American surgeon and politician

David Campbell Lane (June 17, 1927 – September 15, 1997) was an American neurosurgeon who served in the Florida Senate. He was a Republican Party. The Florida Archives have a photographs of him including one where he wears a "bald is beautiful" button.

He was born in Medford, Massachusetts. He joined the United States Navy at the age of 17 and served for two years. He received his Bachelor of Science degree from the University of Tennessee in 1948 and his medical degree from the University of Tennessee College of Medicine in 1951. He conducted his residency at Wisconsin General Hospital in Madison and received his D.A.B in 1956. He moved to Florida in 1956, and worked in Fort Lauderdale.

He later became a Lieutenant Commander in the United States Navy. He served in the Wisconsin Army National Guard as a medical officer and retired as a major in the Florida National Guard.
