= James Tyson Lane =

American politician

James Tyson Lane (April 10, 1835 – October 18, 1885) was an American lawyer and politician.

Lane, son of William Allen and Catharine Lane, was born in Clinton, East Feliciana Parish, Louisiana, April 10, 1835.

He graduated from Yale College in 1855. After graduation he studied in the New Orleans Law School until his admission to the bar in April, 1857. In the succeeding fall he began practice in Richmond, now Tallulah, Madison Parish. On August 17, in the same year, he married Emma F. Lay, of Branford, Conn., who died while visiting relatives in Quincy, Illinois, October 8, 1867.

He entered the Confederate army early in 1862, and joined the 4th Kentucky Regiment, commanded by Colonel Trabue, his former law partner. He lost his right leg at the Battle of Murfreesboro (or Stone River), January 2, 1863, while acting as staff officer under General Breckenridge. In 1863 he was elected to the Louisiana State Senate, and in 1865 he resumed the practice of his profession in Madison Parish, in which he continued to be a prominent lawyer and citizen until his last illness. He died on his cotton plantation, near Tallulah, Madison Parish, Louisiana, October 18, 1885, after an illness of three months, in the 51st year of his age. His only child, a son, survived him.
