= United States Mission to the UN Agencies in Rome =

United States diplomatic mission

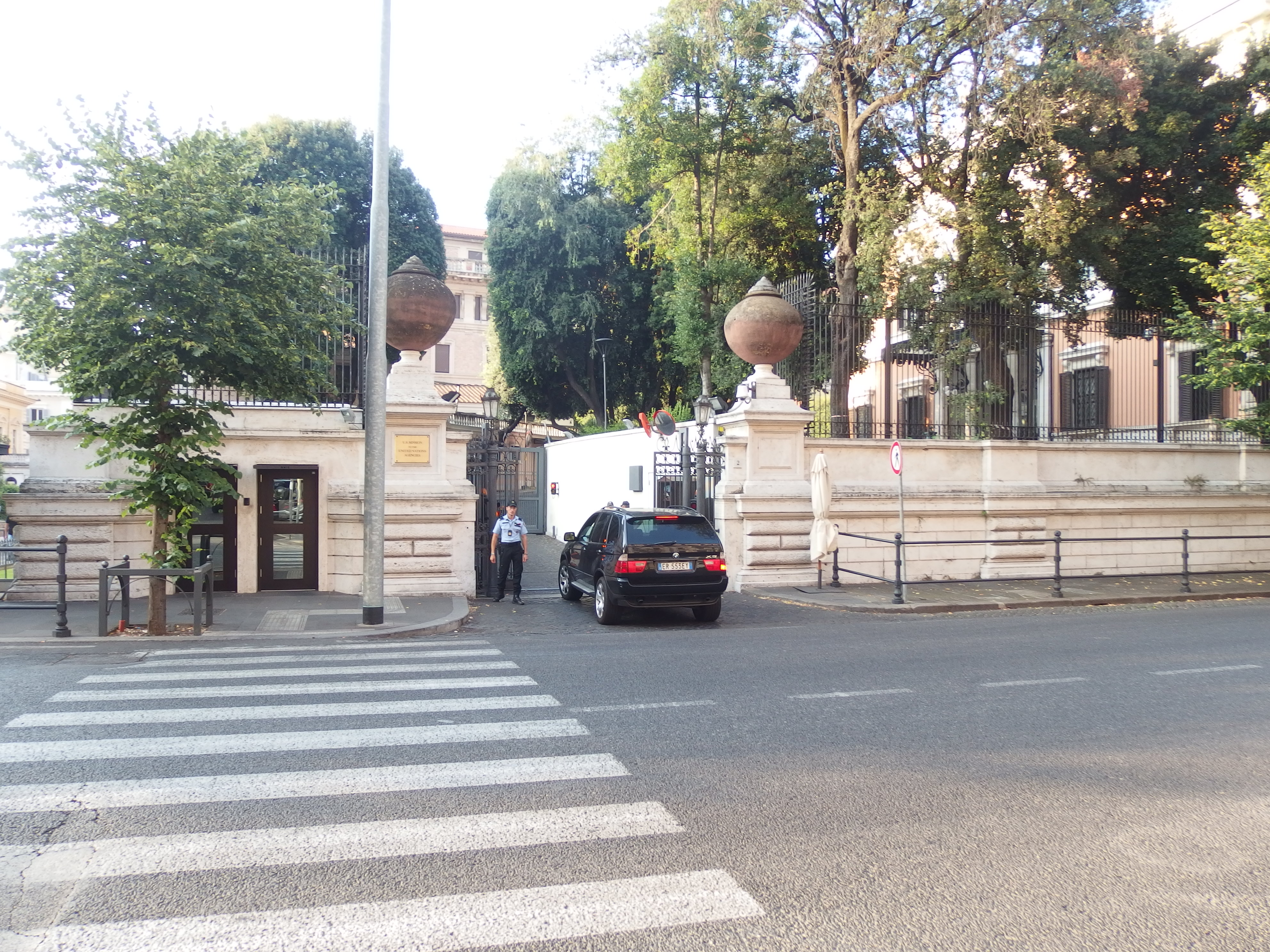
- Entrance to the United States Mission to the UN Agencies in Rome, current site as part of the U.S. Embassy compound
- Location: Rome, Italy
- Address: Via Boncompagni 2, Rome, Italy

The United States Mission to the UN Agencies in Rome serves as a link between the Rome-based international organizations and the U.S. government. Rome is unusual in that there are three U.S. Ambassadors located there; the other U.S. diplomatic missions in Rome are the Embassy of the United States, Rome, and the Embassy of the United States to the Holy See. Together they are referred to as "Tri-Mission Community" in Rome.

The chief of the mission is typically also the United States ambassador to the United Nations Agencies for Food and Agriculture, or a chargé d'affaires if the ambassadorship is vacant.

== The Mission ==
Because Rome is home to the three principal United Nations organizations dedicated to food and agriculture (World Food Programme, Food and Agriculture Organization, and International Fund for Agricultural Development), it is at the center of international efforts to promote sustainable development and combat world hunger. Thus, the Mission plays an essential role in supporting the "Feed the Future" in its work. The U.S. Mission to the UN in Rome serves as a link between the Rome-based international organizations and the U.S. government; the staff at this mission represent the Department of State, Agriculture, and the Agency for International Development. In 2014, per an article in State Magazine, there were some 25 professionals from those departments stationed at the mission. Together, they work to advance UN efforts towards food security overall, with particular attention to areas such as emergency food aid, food safety standards, food production and accompanying environments, and financing for rural development.

The Mission is engaged with six Rome-based multilateral organizations overall; the other three are the International Development Law Organization, the International Institute for the Unification of Private Law, and the International Center for the Study of the Preservation and Restoration of Cultural Property. Staff in the mission work in conjunction with these agencies to improve the legal framework for achieving improved quality-of-life for all residents of developing countries as their economic performance grows.

The mission, like the other two in Rome and other high-profile ambassadorships in Europe, often gets assigned political appointees rather than career foreign service officers. As a result, deputy chiefs of mission are selected for their ability to bring foreign service expertise.

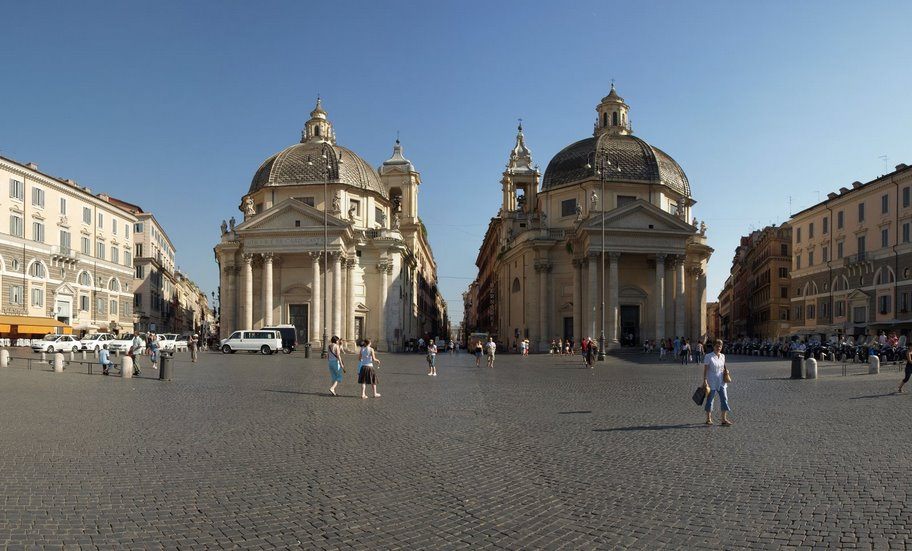
Piazza del Popolo, 18 (far left), prior site of the United States Mission to the UN Agencies in Rome

Since the United States is the largest contributor to the UN worldwide, it has a vital interest in ensuring that UN organizations are efficient and that the activities of the UN complement and enhance the national and foreign policy objectives of the United States. The Mission works to promote the efficient functioning of the UN food organizations and U.S. interests. As an important donor to these international organizations, the Mission advocates the U.S. government's goal of eliminating global hunger, enhancing nutrition, and the use of agriculture as an engine of economic growth.

Formerly, the United States Mission to the UN Agencies in Rome was located in a building on the Piazza del Popolo. However, in December 2011 it was moved to a separate building within the compound of the Embassy of the United States, Rome, just as the Embassy of the United States to the Holy See also has a building within that compound. Like the other two, the Mission to the UN Agencies is housed in historic structures dating to the 16th to 18th centuries.
