= Holy See–United States relations =

- Holy See: United States

Diplomatic mission
- Apostolic Nunciature to the United States: United States Embassy to the Holy See

Envoy
- Apostolic Nuncio Gabriele Giordano Caccia: Ambassador; Brian Burch

The United States Ambassador to the Holy See is Brian Burch, who replaced the interim Chargé d'Affaires Laura Hochla, on September 13, 2025. The Holy See is represented by its apostolic nuncio, Archbishop Gabriele Giordano Caccia, who assumed office in March 2026. The U.S. Embassy to the Holy See is located in Rome, in the Villa Domiziana. The Nunciature to the United States is located in Washington, D.C., at 3339 Massachusetts Avenue, N.W.

== History ==
=== 1797–1867 ===
The United States maintained consular relations with the Papal States from 1797 under President George Washington and Pope Pius VI to 1867 under President Andrew Johnson and Pope Pius IX. Diplomatic relations existed with the Pope, in his capacity as head of state of the Papal States, from 1848 under President James K. Polk to 1867 under President Andrew Johnson, though not at the ambassadorial level. These relations lapsed when on February 28, 1867, Congress passed legislation that prohibited any future funding of United States diplomatic missions to the Holy See. This decision was based on mounting anti-Catholic sentiment in the United States, fueled by the conviction and hanging of Mary Surratt, and three other Catholics, for taking part in the conspiracy to assassinate President Abraham Lincoln. Her son, John Surratt, also Catholic, was accused of plotting with John Wilkes Booth in the assassination of Abraham Lincoln. He served briefly as a Pontifical Zouave but was recognized and arrested. He escaped to Egypt but was eventually arrested and extradited. There was also a false allegation that the Pope had forbidden the celebration of Protestant religious services, which had been held weekly in the home of the American Minister in Rome, within the walls of the city.

=== 1867–1984 ===
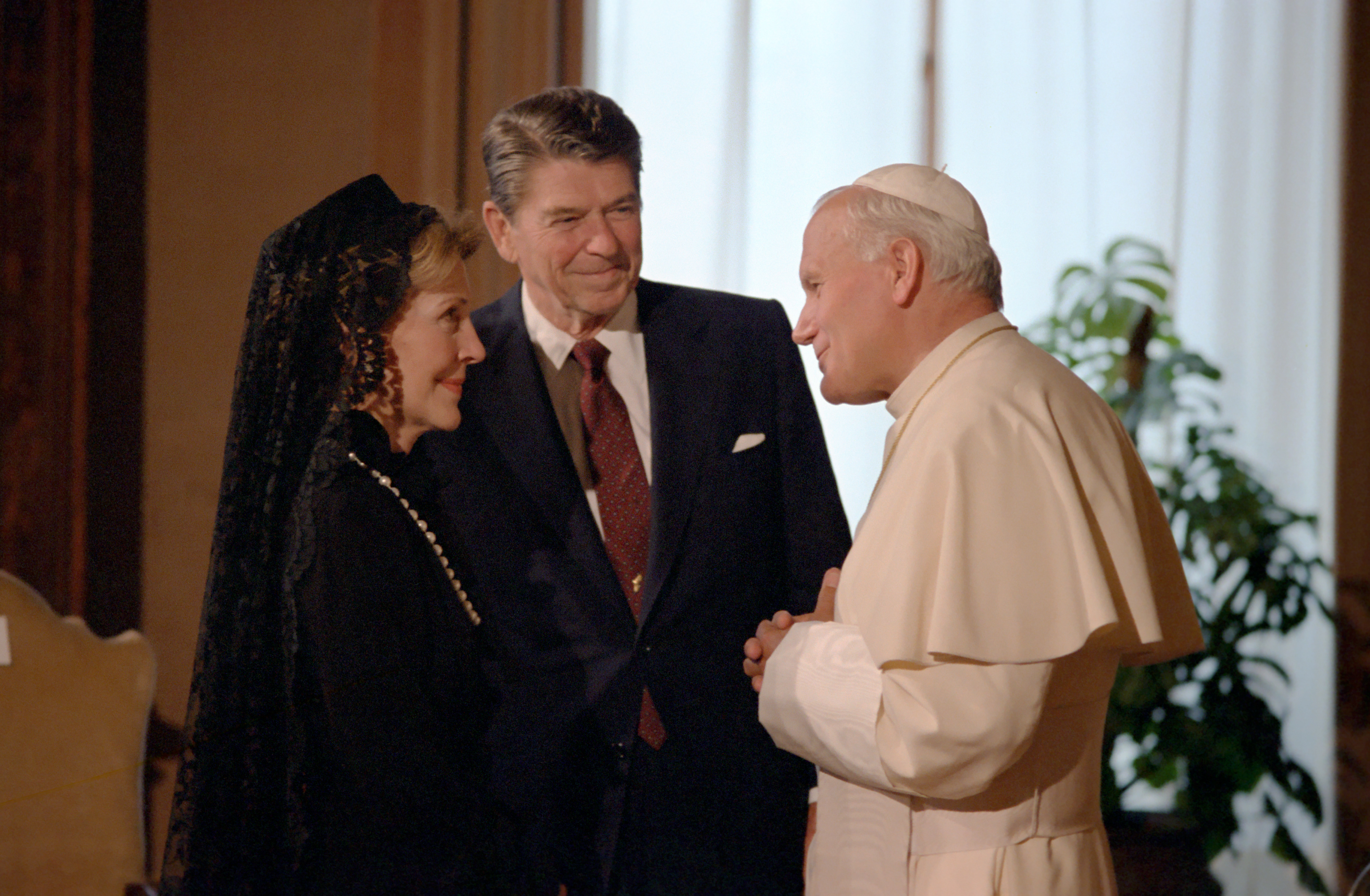
Nancy and Ronald Reagan with Pope John Paul II. (1982)

Due to these rumors, the United States broke off diplomatic relations with the Holy See. In his June 1908 apostolic constitution, Sapienti Consilio, Pope Pius X decreed that as of November 3 that year, the Catholic Church in the United States would no longer be supervised by the Vatican's missionary agency, the Congregation for the Propagation of the Faith (Propaganda Fide), and would now be a mission-sending Church, not “mission territory.”

Several presidents designated personal envoys to visit the Holy See periodically for discussions of international humanitarian and political issues. The first was Postmaster General James Farley, the first high-ranking government official to normalize relations with the Holy See. In 1933, Farley set sail for Europe, along with Soviet Commissar of Foreign Affairs Maxim Litvinov, on the Italian liner SS Conte di Savoia. In Italy, Farley had an audience with Pope Pius XI and dinner with Cardinal Pacelli, who was to succeed to the papacy in 1939. Myron Charles Taylor served Presidents Franklin D. Roosevelt and Harry S. Truman from 1939 to 1950.

Presidents Nixon, Ford, Carter, and Reagan also appointed personal envoys to the Pope. Also, all of those presidents, in addition to Truman, Eisenhower, Kennedy, Johnson, and all later presidents, along with the first ladies, in diplomatic dress code black and mantillas, have visited the Vatican, during the course of their administrations.

On October 20, 1951, President Truman nominated former General Mark W. Clark to be the United States emissary to the Holy See. Clark later withdrew his nomination on January 13, 1952, following protests from Senator Tom Connally (D-TX) and Protestant groups. The official prohibition lasted until September 22, 1983, when it was repealed by the "Lugar Act".

The Vatican has historically been accused of being un-American, at least until the presidency of John F. Kennedy (see Americanism (heresy), nativism and anti-Catholicism in the United States). The bulk of the accusation is found in Paul Blanshard's book American Freedom and Catholic Power, which attacked the Holy See on grounds that it was a dangerous, powerful, foreign and undemocratic institution.

=== 1984–present ===
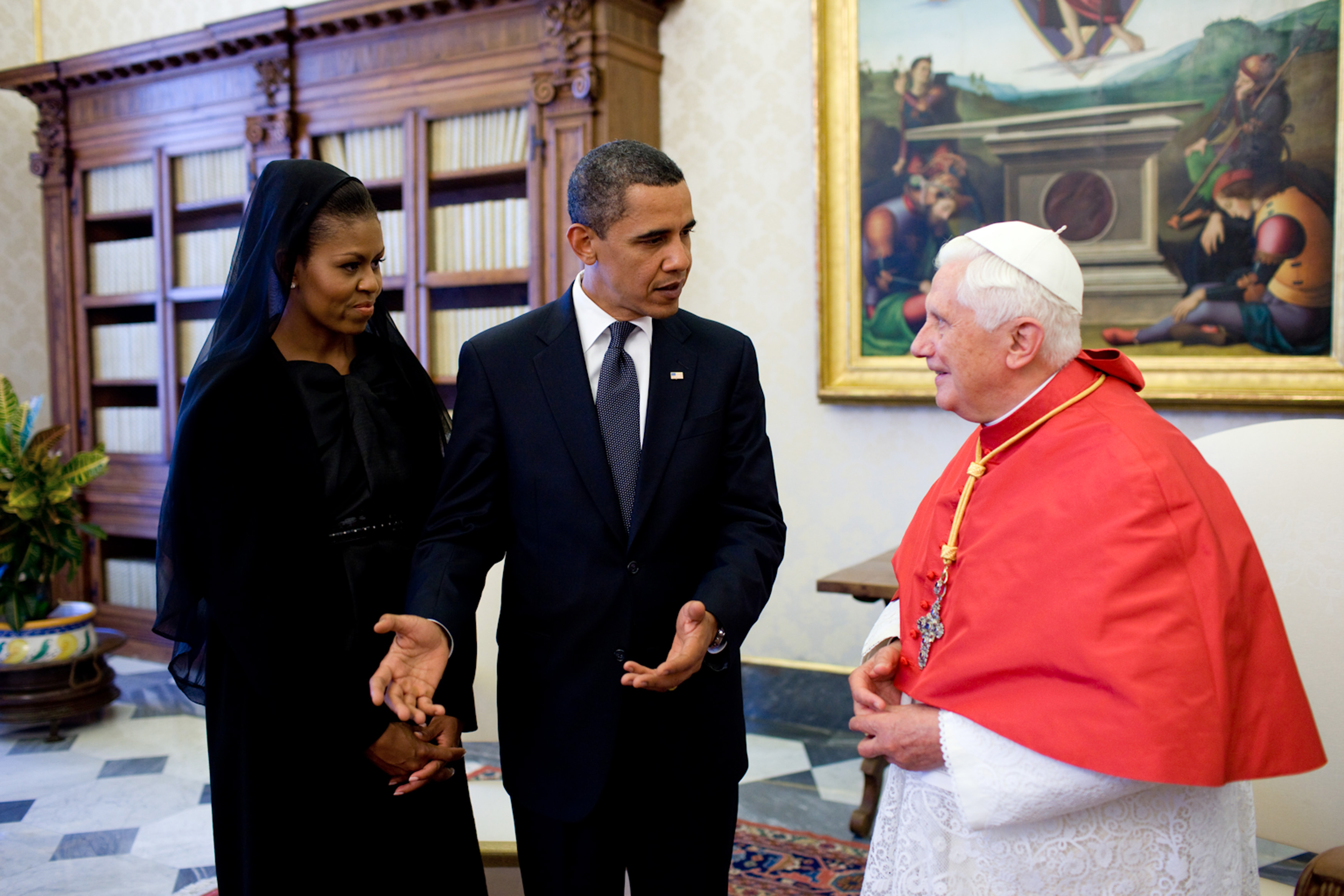
U.S. President Barack Obama and First Lady Michelle Obama meet with Pope Benedict XVI at the Vatican on July 10, 2009.

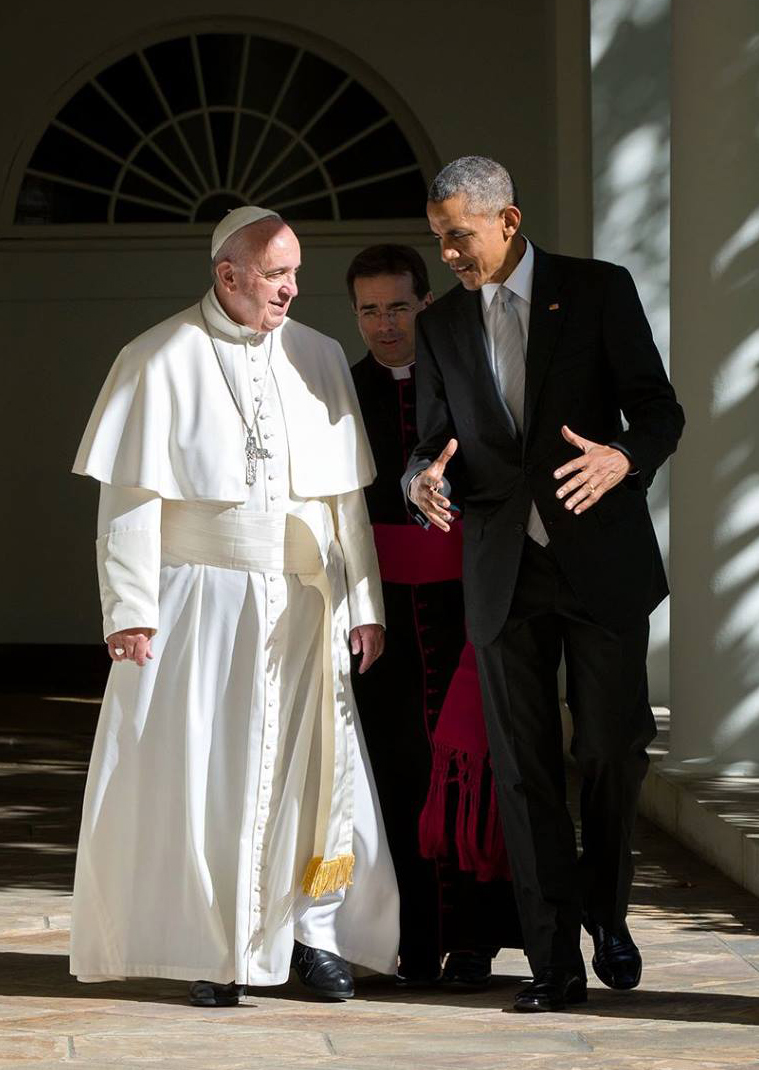
Pope Francis and U.S. President Barack Obama at the White House in 2015

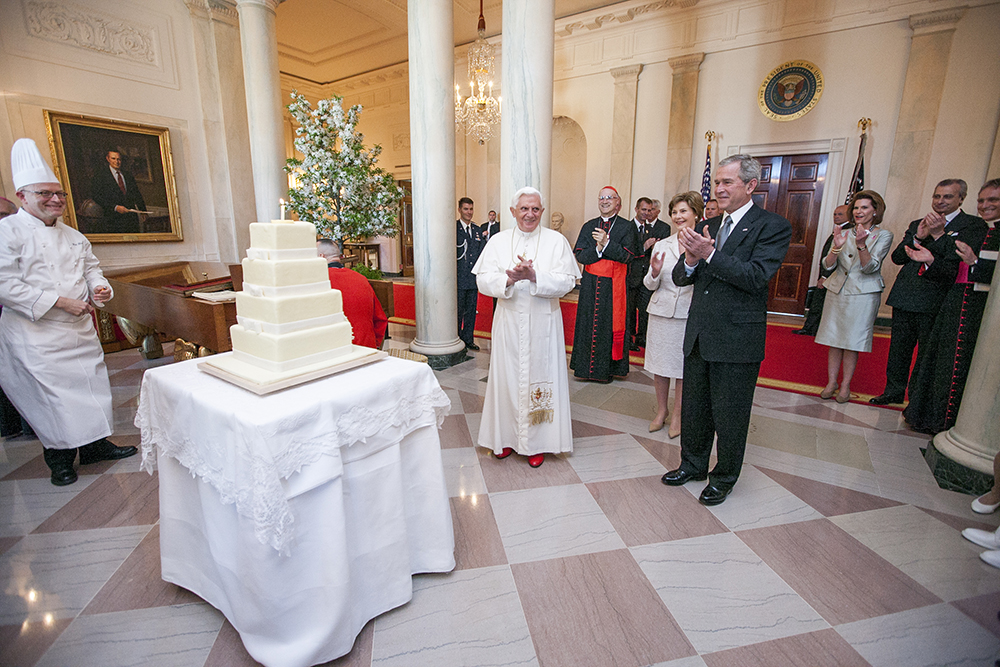
Pope Benedict XVI celebrates his 81st birthday with President George W. Bush and First Lady Laura Bush on April 16, 2008.

The United States and the Holy See announced the establishment of diplomatic relations on January 10, 1984. In sharp contrast to the long record of strong domestic opposition, this time there was very little opposition from Congress, the courts, and Protestant groups. On March 7, 1984, the Senate confirmed William A. Wilson as the first U.S. ambassador to the Holy See. Ambassador Wilson had been President Reagan's personal envoy to the Pope since 1981. The Holy See named Archbishop Pio Laghi as the first Apostolic Nuncio (equivalent to ambassador) of the Holy See to the U.S. Archbishop Laghi had been Pope John Paul II's apostolic delegate to the Catholic Church in the United States since 1980. Relations between Ronald Reagan and Pope John Paul II were close especially because of their shared anti-communism and keen interest in forcing the Soviets out of Poland. Also, the two men forged a common bond over having survived assassination attempts just six weeks apart in the spring of 1981. Recent research has confirmed that the exchange between high-ranking staff of the two administration was extraordinarily frequent and cordial during this era.

After a general decline of the intensity of relations during the 1990s, and following the September 11 attacks and the beginning of the US war on terror from 2001, the Vatican has been critical of the war on terrorism in general, and particularly critical of the Iraq War. However, some high-ranking representatives of the Vatican, including Cardinal Ratzinger (later elected Pope Benedict XVI in 2005), supported a re-election of George W. Bush - although his opponent in the presidential race, John Kerry, was one of only three Catholic presidential candidates in U.S. history.

On July 10, 2009, President Barack Obama and Pope Benedict XVI met in Rome. A planned relocation of the U.S. embassy to the Holy See to the same location as the U.S. embassy to Italy drew criticism from several former U.S. ambassadors. On March 27, 2014, Obama and Pope Francis met in Rome; this was followed by Pope Francis's 2015 visit to North America in September 2015, where, after visiting Cuba, he went to the U.S., and participated in the World Meeting of Families in Philadelphia, and also visited Washington, D.C., and New York City.

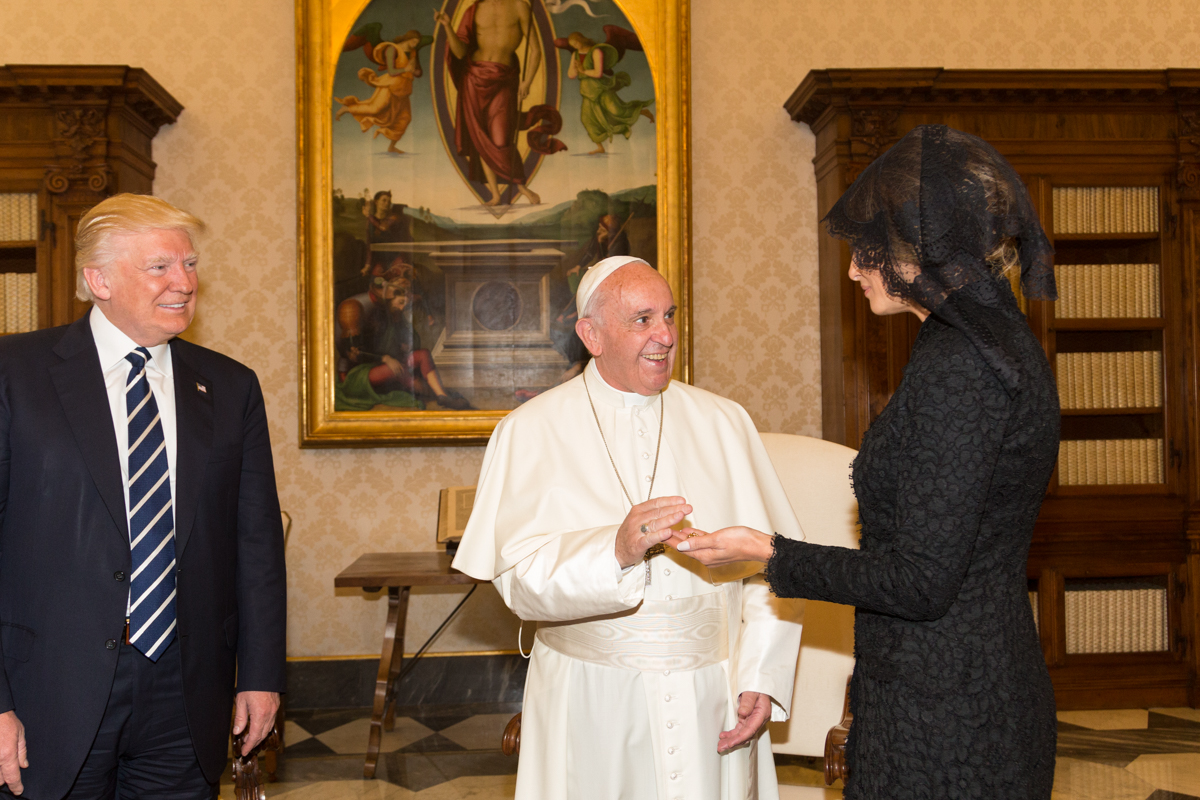
U.S. President Donald Trump and First Lady Melania Trump meet with Pope Francis at the Vatican on May 24, 2017.

In June 2015, the United States and the Holy See concluded their first inter-governmental agreement which aims at curtailing offshore tax evasion through automatic exchange of tax information.

In May 2017, President Donald Trump met with Pope Francis in the Vatican. The two exchanged gifts, and following a closed door meeting, Trump said "Thank you. Thank you. I won't forget what you said".

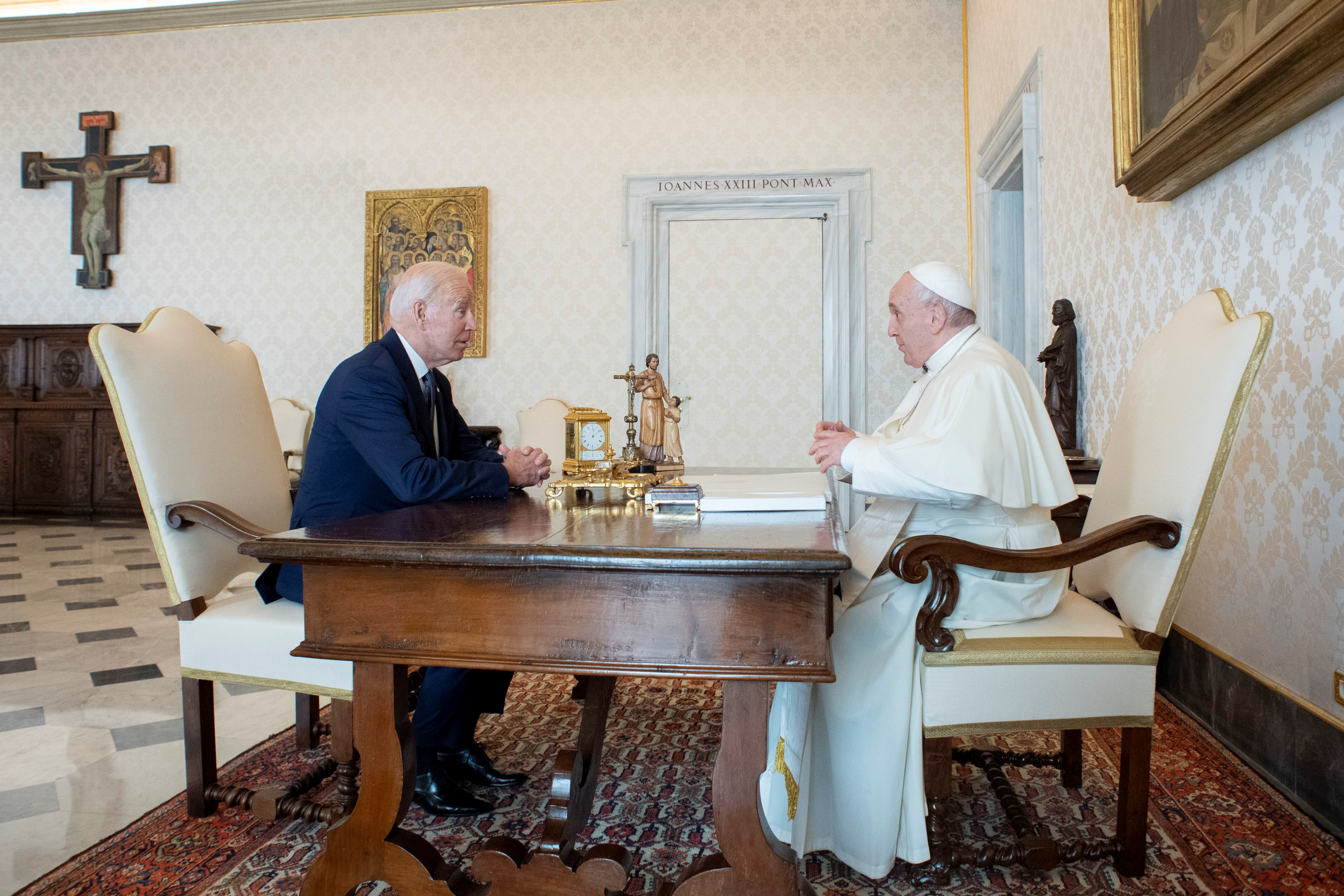
U.S. President Joe Biden and Pope Francis at the Vatican on October 29, 2021

In October 2021, President Joe Biden met with Pope Francis in the Vatican. Biden later claimed that Pope Francis said in a private meeting that he was a good Catholic and should continue to receive Communion.

In May 2025, American-born Robert Francis Prevost, then-Prefect of the Dicastery for Bishops and then-President of the Pontifical Commission for Latin America, was elected Pope and took the Papal name as Pope Leo XIV, becoming the first Pope to come from the United States, the first Pope from North America, the second Pope to come from the Americas (after his immediate predecessor Pope Francis), the first Pope with dual citizenship (for Pope Leo XIV holds both a US citizenship and a Peruvian citizenship), the first Pope from an English-speaking country since Adrian IV in the 12th century, and the first Pope to be born after World War II and during the Cold War, as well as first pope to be born in the Baby Boomer generation.

An April 2026 report from The Free Press said that at a January meeting, US Under Secretary of Defense for Policy Elbridge Colby told a Vatican official that the US "has the military power to do whatever it wants" and that the "Church had better take its side". Another official allegedly invoked the Avignon Papacy, a period during the 1300s where the French monarchy used its military power to control the papacy. Both the DOD and the Vatican issued statements stating that reports claiming an adversarial meeting were untrue.

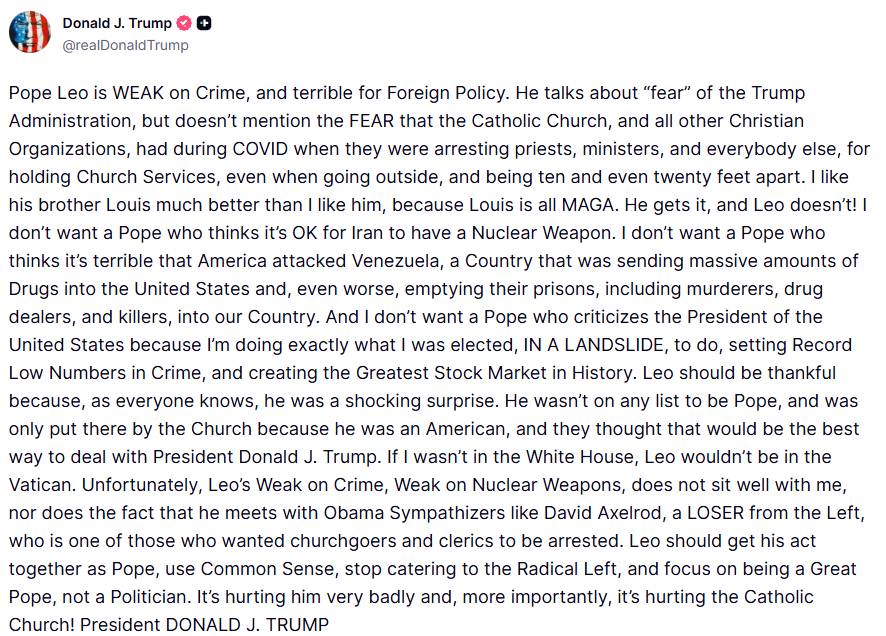
Trump's April 12, 2026 Truth Social post on Pope Leo XIV. Hours later, Trump posted a picture of himself depicted as Jesus, drawing widespread criticism and resulting in Trump removing the post.

Further tensions emerged when the Holy See criticised the Trump administration's military actions and foreign policy against Venezuela and Iran. After genocidal threats were made by Donald Trump to Iran on April 7 saying "a whole civilization will die", Pope Leo XIV called for peace. On April 12, 2026, President Donald Trump directly criticized the pope in a Truth Social post, writing that "Pope Leo is WEAK on Crime, and terrible for Foreign Policy," and added, "I don’t want a Pope who thinks it’s OK for Iran to have a Nuclear Weapon." Marco Politi, a long time Vatican observer and author, stated: "You have to jump back to the Middle Ages when kings and emperors were shouting against the pope in Rome and calling him false. There is just no other recent example like this." Similarly, academic Andrew Chestnut stated, "I cannot think of any parallels, at least coming from Western Christian majority countries, of such pointed and public attacks on the Pope."

== Catholicism in the United States ==
US Roman Catholic dioceses map

The Catholic Church is one of the largest religious communities in the United States. Around 20% of the adult US population currently identify as Catholic (as of 2024). This makes Catholicism the second largest religious denomination in the country after Protestantism and the single church with the largest membership. In absolute terms, this corresponds to around 53 million Catholic adults. This makes the US the country with the fourth largest Catholic population in the world, after Brazil, Mexico, and the Philippines. However, its share has declined slightly in recent decades (in 2007 it was still around 24%) and is undergoing demographic change. While US Catholicism in the early 20th century was still dominated by Irish and Italian immigrants, Hispanic Americans represent a growing group within the Church (around 36% of US Catholics are Hispanic and Latino Americans, often of Mexican descent). Overall, more than 40% of Catholics in the US are first- or second-generation immigrants.

Institutionally, the Catholic Church has a nationwide presence. It comprises 177 Latin dioceses (bishoprics) and archdioceses, as well as several Eastern Catholic eparchies in the US. Together, the Church operates a wide network of parishes (around 17,000) and charitable institutions. Education and health are two traditional areas of Catholic activities: Catholic school boards maintain nearly 6,000 schools (mostly elementary and middle schools) with almost 1.8 million students in the 2023/24 school year. Many universities (such as the University of Notre Dame and the renowned Georgetown University) are also Catholic-run. Catholic organizations play a significant role in healthcare, with 645 Catholic hospitals in the country in 2014. In addition, the Church operates nursing homes, orphanages, counseling centers, and one of the largest social welfare organizations (Catholic Charities), which supports millions of Americans in need each year, regardless of their religious affiliation.

Although Catholics in the US were a discriminated religious minority for a long time, they have developed a lasting influence on society and politics. In the 19th century, Catholic immigrants from Europe integrated into social life. Catholics formed an important part of the urban working class and were early participants in the labor movement and the struggle for social reform. American Catholics were a core component of President Franklin D. Roosevelt's New Deal coalition and supported social policy measures to overcome the Great Depression. A milestone in political emancipation was the election of John F. Kennedy as president in 1960. Kennedy became the first Catholic to hold the highest office in the United States, breaking down decades of mistrust toward Catholics. Today, Catholics are considered important swing voters. With around a quarter of the US electorate, they represent a coveted voting bloc.

== Covert cooperation during the Cold War ==
During the Cold War, an unusual alliance formed behind the scenes between American intelligence agencies and Catholic networks to counter global communism. After World War II, the CIA recognized the value of the Vatican as an information hub: every day, reports from thousands of priests, bishops, and nuncios from all over the world—including from behind the Iron Curtain—were received in Rome, making the Vatican a "gold mine" for intelligence information. The foundation for the special relationship between the Vatican and US intelligence was laid in 1944 by OSS director William J. Donovan, who met Pope Pius XII in Rome that year and became a close ally of Felix Morlion, who established his own intelligence service, Pro Deo. The 1948 elections in Italy served as a blueprint for joint cooperation, with the CIA and the Catholic Church working closely together to prevent the Partito Comunista Italiano from seizing power. During the Cold War, the CIA provided financial support to Catholic clergy in various countries, as they were considered trustworthy anti-communists.

In addition, the American secret service attempted to influence the Curia. According to research by author Martin A. Lee, the CIA deliberately infiltrated Catholic elite networks such as the Sovereign Military Order of Malta, in which CIA Director William Casey and Secretary of State Alexander Haig, among others, where allegedly members. CIA agents attempted to promote sympathetic Vatican dignitaries while spying on progressive churchmen in the Pope's circle. A key objective was to align the Holy See's foreign policy with anti-communism. To this end, the CIA cooperated closely with secret Catholic organizations such as Opus Dei, an ultra-conservative group that exerted influence in the church and society. In Latin America in the 1980s, US agencies supported right-wing Catholic circles in weakening Marxist-inspired liberation theologians and left-wing clerics. The Reagan administration regarded liberation theology as a dangerous ideological weapon, which it countered with a "counteroffensive" by traditional Catholic forces such as Opus Dei.

This covert alliance also had an impact within the Vatican itself. Pope John Paul II, who in 1978 became the first Eastern European to ascend to the Chair of St. Peter, shared Washington's hardline anti-communist stance. The CIA is even said to have indirectly promoted Karol Wojtyła's election as pope by supporting groups within the Church who saw a Polish pope as the "perfect vehicle" for Western interests. In fact, influential cardinals and lay people such as those from Opus Dei campaigned for Wojtyła in the run-up to the 1978 conclave. John Paul II later returned the favor with special favors: in October 1982, he surprisingly elevated Opus Dei to the rank of a personal prelature, directly subordinate to the pope. This distinction—which was effectively equivalent to worldwide recognition as a separate clergy—was, according to observers, a "reward" for the considerable role Opus Dei had played in Wojtyła's election and in the fight against communism. At the same time, the Pope sought to remove the more left-wing Jesuits from power: their Superior General, Pedro Arrupe, was deposed in 1981 under pressure from Rome and replaced by a transitional leader loyal to the Pope, which was very welcome to Opus Dei.

One highlight of this secret cooperation was the support given to the Polish freedom movement Solidarność. From 1982 onwards, Pope John Paul II and President Reagan maintained a direct channel of communication in order to strengthen the Polish underground trade union against the communist regime. Money, communications equipment, and advisors were sent to Solidarność via Polish priests and Western trade unions, partly financed by CIA funds and secret Vatican accounts. At the same time, valuable information flowed from Poland to the Americans thanks to church contacts. The role of the Vatican in financing irregular anti-communist networks remained unclear. There are indications that in Italy in the 1970s, the CIA maintained contacts with the illegal P2 (Propaganda Due) masonic lodge and mafia circles involved in Vatican financial scandals. The mysterious death of Pope John Paul I in 1978, after only 33 days in office, also gave rise to conspiracy theories. He belonged to the liberal wing of the Catholic Church and was unpopular with Opus Dei.

== See also ==
- Catholic Church and politics in the United States
- Americanism
- American Christian
- Anti-Catholicism in the United States
- List of ambassadors of the United States to the Holy See
- Papal visits to the United States
- Pope Pius IX and the United States
- Pope Leo XIV
