= Order of Pope Pius IX =

Papal Order of Knighthood of the Holy See

Order of Pope Pius IX Ordine di Pio IX (Italian)
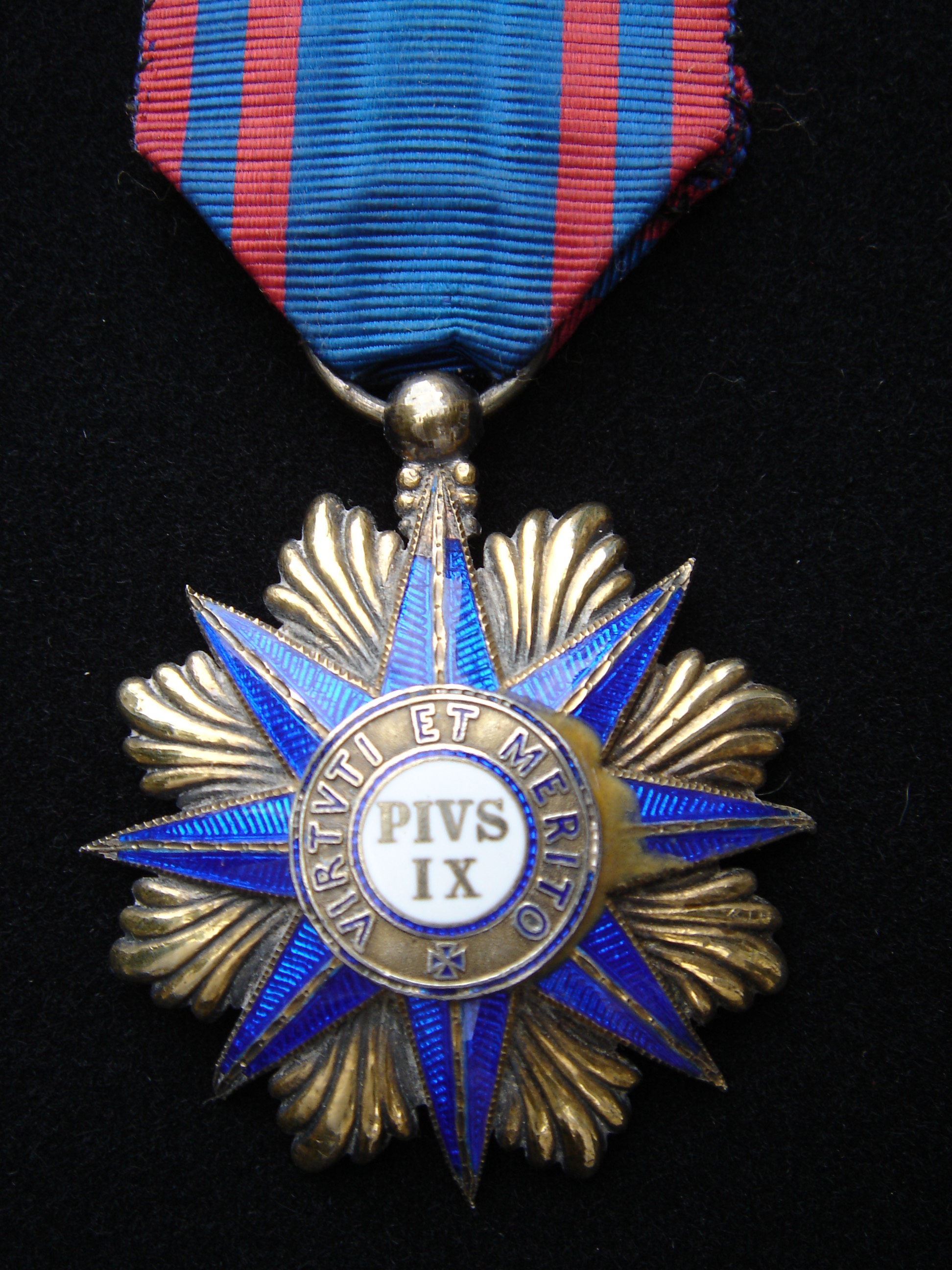
- Knight's cross of the Order of Pius IX

Awarded by the Holy See
- Type: Papal order of knighthood
- Established: 17 June 1847; 179 years ago
- Religious affiliation: Catholic
- Motto: Virtuti et Merito (Latin); For Virtue and Merit (English)
- Status: Currently constituted
- First head: Pope Pius IV
- Sovereign: Pope Leo XIV
- Classes: Knight/Dame with the Collar (GCCPO); Knight/Dame Grand Cross (GCPO); Knight/Dame Commander with Star (KC*PO/DC*PO); Knight/Dame Commander (KCPO/DCPO); Knight/Dame (KPO/DPO)

Precedence
- Next (higher): Order of the Golden Spur
- Next (lower): Order of St. Gregory the Great
- Ribbon bar of the order

The Order of Pope Pius IX (Italian: Ordine di Pio IX), also referred as the Pian Order (Italian: Ordine Piano, pronounced [piˈaːno]), is a papal order of knighthood originally founded by Pope Pius IV in 1560. It is the highest honor currently conferred by the Holy See (two higher honors, the Supreme Order of Christ and the Order of the Golden Spur, are dormant). The awarding of the order fell into disuse and was re-instituted by Pope Pius IX as a continuation on 17 June 1847.

The highest rank awarded by the Pope is the Collar of the Order, usually to Catholic heads of state on the occasion of official visits to the Holy See. The Grand Cross is the highest Papal award given to lay men and women, ordinarily given to resident Ambassadors accredited to the Holy See after two years in post and rarely to exceptional Catholics in the wider world for particular services, mainly in the international field and for outstanding deeds for Church and society.

The rank of Knight is almost never awarded. When it is, it is given in recognition of high-profile services rendered to the Holy See or directly to the person of the Pontiff, by Catholic faithful of distinguished status, almost always belonging to ancient European noble families.

The other two ranks (Commander and Commander with Star) are granted sparingly to lay Catholics, usually in diplomatic roles, for extraordinary merit or deeds for the Church and society. The order is awarded to Catholics and, on occasion and only for diplomatic reasons, to non-Catholics and non-Christians as well.

== History of the Order ==
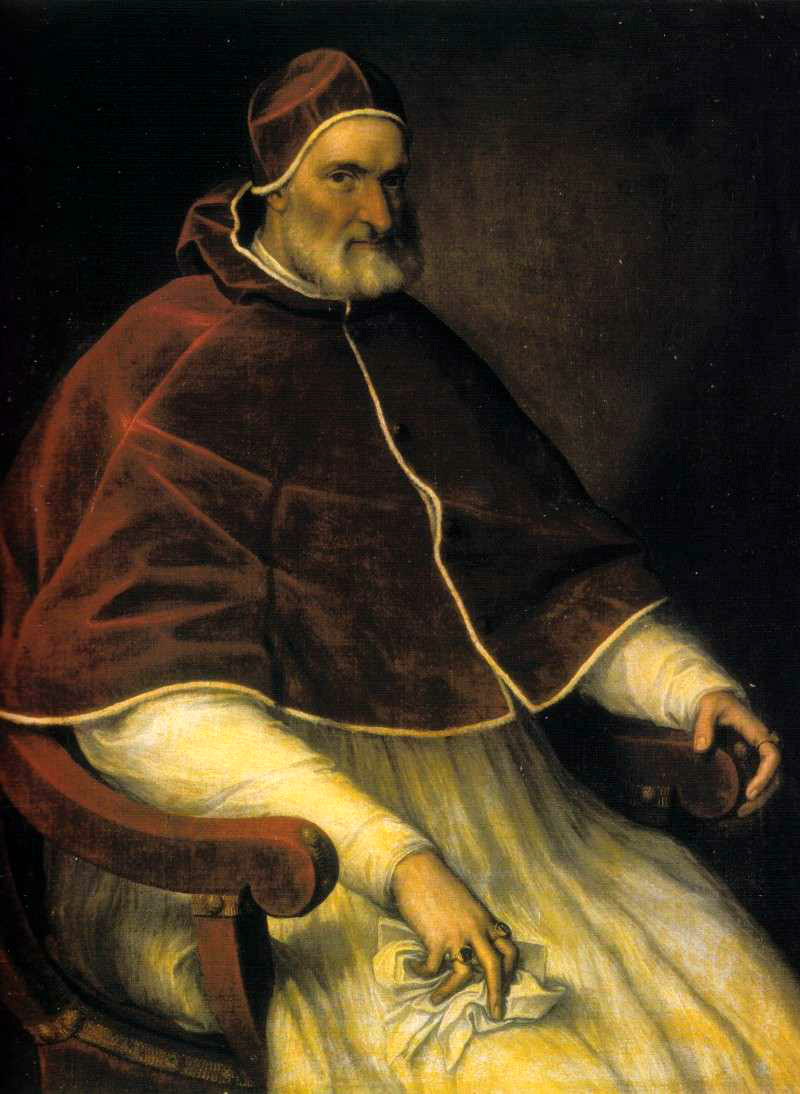
Pope Pius IV founded the first Pian Order in 1560.

The Order was founded on 17 June 1847, by Pope Pius IX with the decree Romanis Pontificibus, placing it as the continuation of the ancient order established by Pope Pius IV with the bull Pii patris amplissimi on March 1559. These noble knights formed the lay court of the Roman Pontiff, being defined participants, since they "participated" in the life of the Pontiff, offering him an escort and often residing in the Apostolic Palace; they often shared the table with the Pontiff and accompanied him during his daily tasks.

The subsequent decree Cum Hominum Mentes of 17 June 1849, confirmed the ancient privilege of personal nobility through membership in the Pian Order, thus creating it the only ennobler of the Holy Apostolic See. With another decree dated 11 November 1856, the Roman Pontiff himself divided the Order into three classes: Knight Grand Cross, Commander, and Knight.

Pope Pius X reformed the Pontifical orders with the decree Multum ad excitandos of 7 February 1905, the new class of Commander with star (correspondent to the class of Grand Officer) was created.

The Pian Order was then reformed again by Pope Pius XII, with a Bull dated 11 November 1939, which suppressed the privilege of nobility. From the historical point of view, the Knighthood of the Grand Cross of the Pian Order has held the role that was of the Militia Aurata before the reform of Gregory XVI, namely that of title of rank and ennobling of the Holy See from the sixteenth century to 1841.

== Order of Classes ==
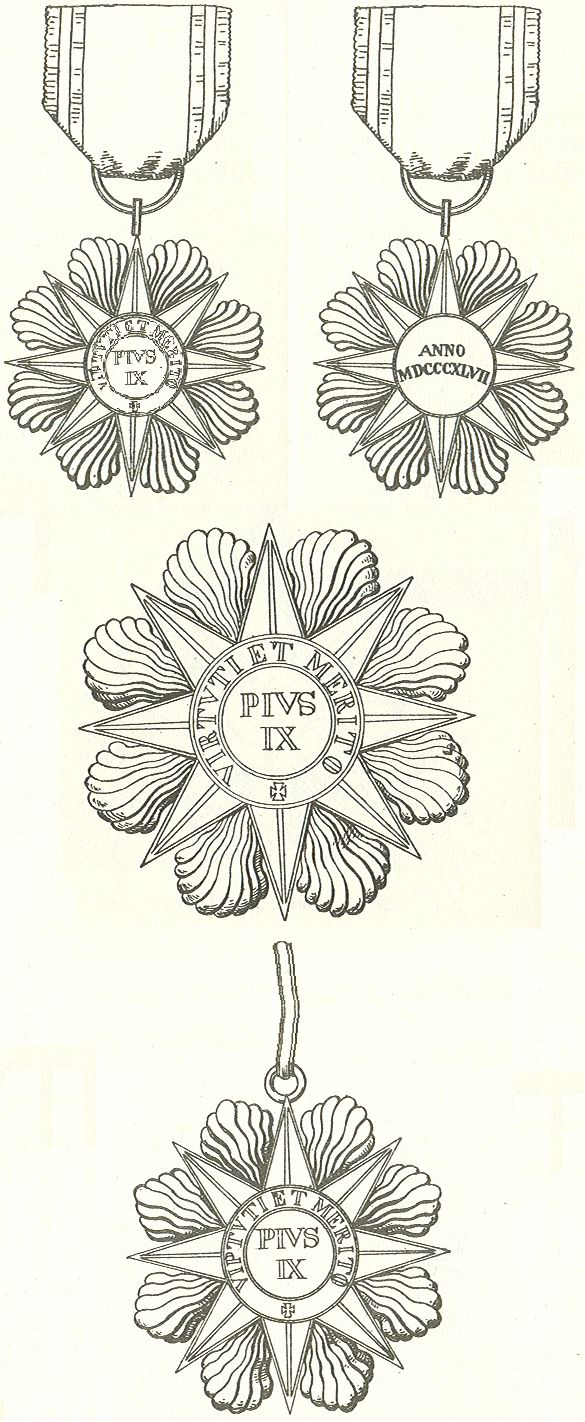
1893 artistic sketch of the medal

The Order comprises five classes:

- Knight with the Collar (GCCPO): who wear a gold chain around their shoulders which is decorated with the papal tiara and two doves, and on the breast a large star. It is the highest active papal decoration, and is reserved for heads of state.
- Knight/Dame Grand Cross (GCPO): who wear a wide dark blue silk ribbon (sash) bordered with red which extends saltire-wise from the left shoulder to the right side where the insignia of the order is suspended by a rosette, and on the breast a large diamond-studded star. It is commonly awarded to the ambassadors accredited to the Holy See.
- Knight/Dame Commander with Star (KC*PO/DC*PO): who in addition to the badge wear a star of smaller design than that of Knights of the Grand Cross on the breast.
- Knight/Dame Commander (KCPO/DCPO): who wear the decoration at the neck.
- Knight/Dame (KPO/DPO): who wear the star on the left breast.

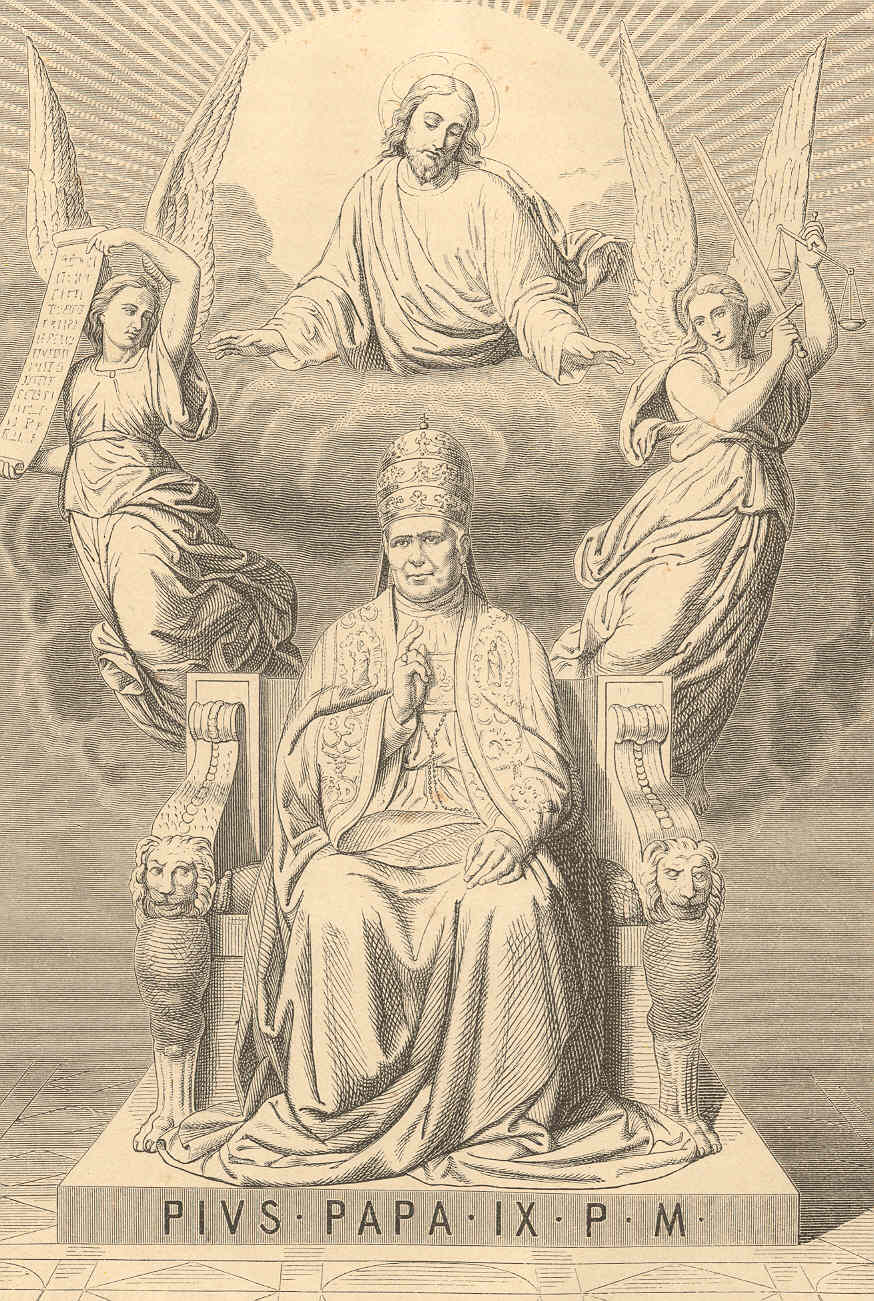
Pope Pius IX, re-instituted the Pian Order under his Papal name and pontificate in 1847.

Knight/Dame	Knight/Dame Commander	Knight/Dame Commander with Star	Knight/Dame Grand Cross	Knight with the Collar

== Insignia and uniform ==
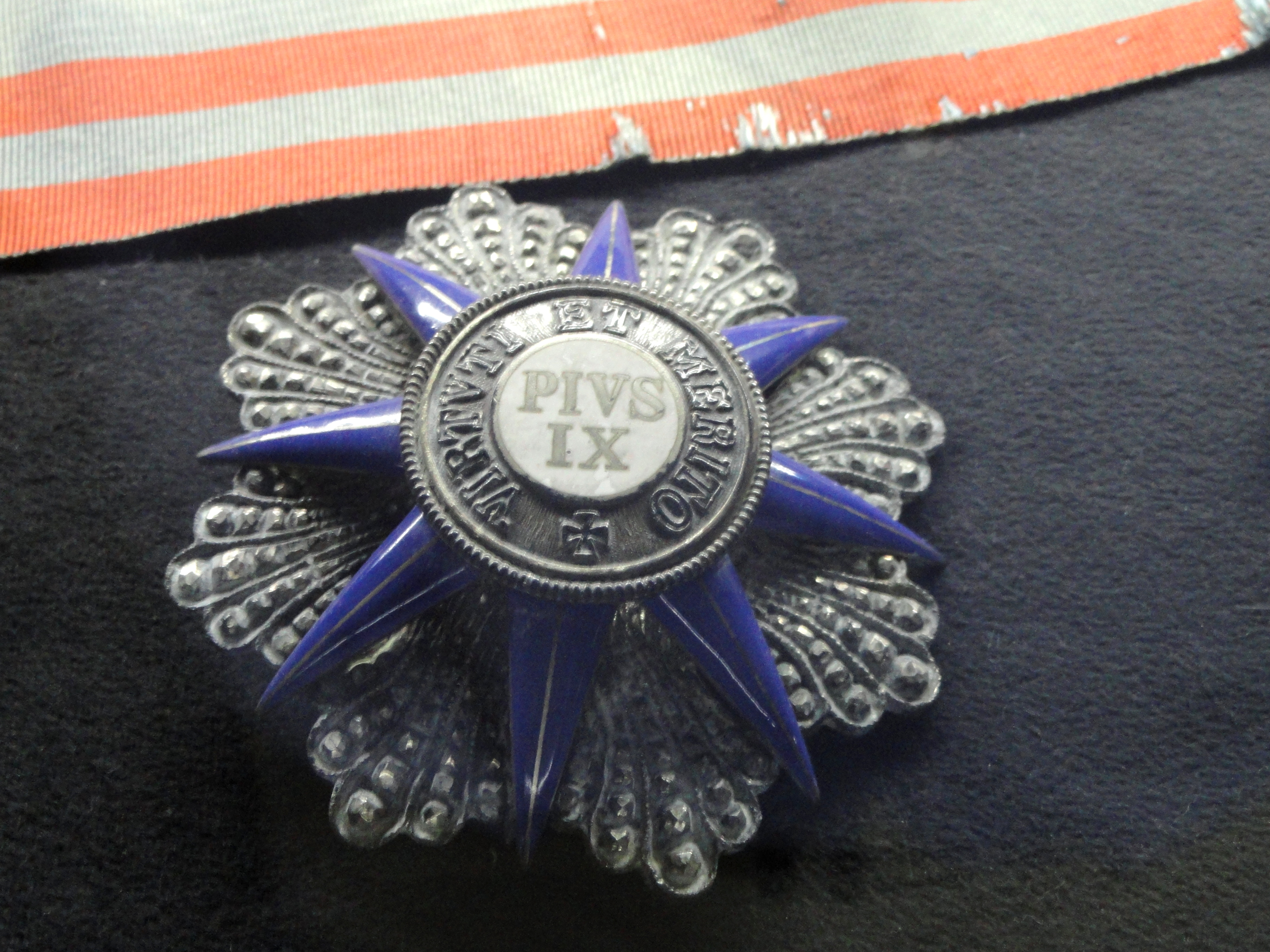
The Pian medal belonging to the 21st President of Brazil Juscelino Kubitschek, unrestored and on display on his memorial

The decoration is a regular octagram made of blue enamel, the spaces between the rays filled with gold flames. On the white medallion in the center the name of the founder surrounded by the words Virtuti et Merito ("Virtue and Merit") is engraved. The reverse side is the same save for the substitution of Anno 1847 for Pius IX. The rarely worn official uniform consists of an elaborately embroidered dark blue evening coat with golden epaulettes, white trousers, and a white-plumed bicorne.

Knights with the Collar wear a gold decorated chain around the neck, and a star on the left side of the breast; Knights Grand Cross wear a sash and a star on the left side of the breast; Commanders wear a cross around the neck; and Knights wear a smaller cross on the left breast of the uniform:

== Notable members ==
=== Royal houses and nobility ===
- Juan Carlos I, former King of Spain, first and honorary canon of the Basilica of Saint Mary Major, with Collar
- Fra' Andrew Bertie, 78th Prince and Grand Master of the Sovereign Military Order of Malta, with Collar
- Henri, former Grand Duke of Luxembourg, with Collar
- Albert II, former King of the Belgians, with Collar
- Carl XVI Gustaf, King of Sweden, with Collar
- Silvia, Queen of Sweden
- Franz Joseph II, Prince of Liechtenstein, with Collar
- Haile Selassie I, Emperor of Ethiopia
- Mwambutsa IV, King of Burundi
- Bhumibol Adulyadej, King of Thailand, with Collar
- Charles III, King of the United Kingdom, with Collar
- Camilla, Queen of the United Kingdom
- Gabriel García Moreno y Morán de Butrón, Duke of the Holy Faith (pontifical), former President of Ecuador, with Collar
- Miles Fitzalan-Howard, 17th Duke of Norfolk, Earl Marshal, Premier Duke in the Peerage of England
- Herman, Count Van Rompuy, former prime minister of Belgium
- Charles de Broqueville, 1st Comte de Broqueville, former prime minister of Belgium.
- Paul Joseph, Comte de Smet de Naeyer, former prime minister of Belgium
- Charles, Count Woeste, Belgian Minister

=== Heads of State and Politicians ===
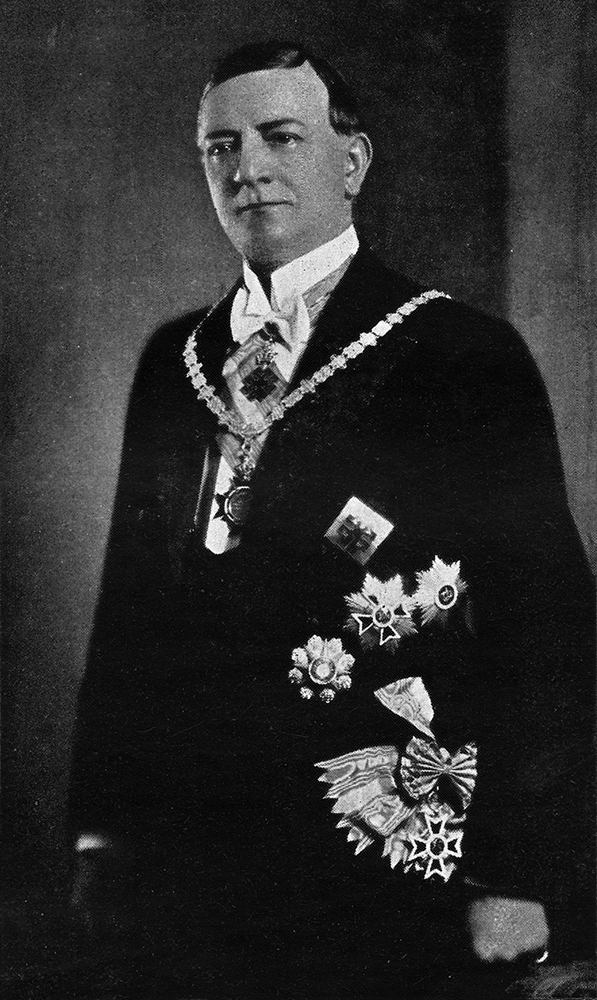
Constantin Isopescu-Grecul, Austrian-Hungarian/Romanian politician, jurist and legal scholar, wearing the star of the Order of Pius IX

- Emir Abdelkader, Algerian leader insurgent against French colonial rule.
- Sergio Mattarella, current President of Italy
- Marcelo Rebelo de Sousa, current President of Portugal
- Nicos Anastasiades, former President of Cyprus
- Giorgio Napolitano, former President of Italy
- Carlo Azeglio Ciampi, former President of Italy
- Oscar Luigi Scalfaro, former President of Italy
- Francesco Cossiga, former President of Italy
- Jacques Chirac, former President of France
- Marco Fidel Suárez, former President of Colombia
- Konstantinos Stephanopoulos, former President of Greece
- Diosdado Macapagal, former President of the Philippines
- Juscelino Kubitschek, former President of Brazil
- Carlos Menem, former President of Argentina
- Demetris Christofias, former President of Cyprus
- Urho Kekkonen, former President of Finland
- Saitō Makoto, former Prime Minister of Japan
- Władysław Grabski, former Prime Minister of Poland
- George Papandreou, former Prime Minister of Greece
- Franz von Papen, former Vice-Chancellor of Germany
- Juan Vicente Gómez, former President of Venezuela
- Sukarno, former President of Indonesia
- W.T. Cosgrave, former President of the Executive Council of the Irish Free State
- Sean T. O'Kelly, former President of Ireland
- Sarit Thanarat, former Prime Minister of Thailand
- Nikol Pashinyan, current Prime Minister of Armenia
- Ivo Miro Jović, former member of the Presidency of Bosnia and Herzegovina
- Giorgio Borg Olivier, former Prime Minister of Malta
- Constantin Isopescu-Grecul, Romanian politician, jurist and university professor.
- Petr Fiala, former prime minister of the Czech Republic
- Kurt Waldheim, former President of Austria
- Masoud Barzani, Kurdish political leader, and former President of the Kurdistan Region.

=== Diplomats to the Holy See ===
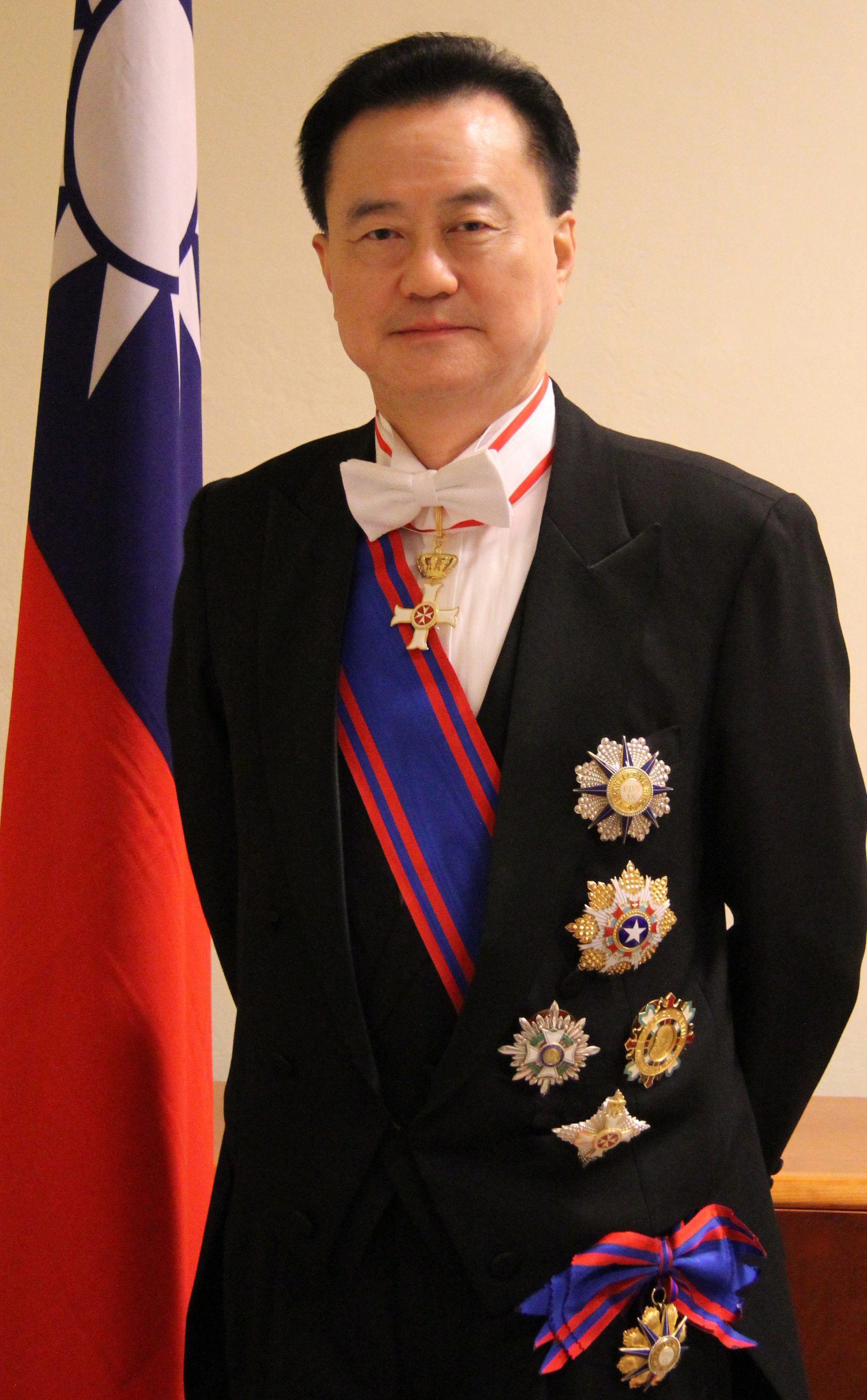
Larry Wang, Ambassador of the Republic of China to the Holy See, wearing sash and star of the Order of Pius IX

- Callista Gingrich, former United States ambassador to the Holy See
- Mercedes Arrastia Tuason, former Philippine ambassador to the Holy See
- William A. Wilson, former United States ambassador to the Holy See
- Francis Joseph Shakespeare, former United States ambassador to the Holy See
- Thomas Patrick Melady, former United States ambassador to the Holy See
- Raymond Flynn, former mayor of Boston, Massachusetts, former ambassador to the Holy See
- Lindy Boggs, former Member of Congress, former ambassador to the Holy See
- Khétévane Bagration de Moukhrani, former Georgian ambassador to the Holy See
- Tim Fischer, former Australian deputy prime minister and former Australian ambassador to the Holy See
- Mohammad Hossein Mokhtari, Iran

=== Other notable members ===
- Jean-Pierre Mazery, Grand Chancellor of the Sovereign Military Order of Malta
- Virgil C. Dechant, former vice-president for the Vatican Bank & Supreme Knight of the Knights of Columbus

== See also ==
- Papal Orders of Knighthood
