= Nine days =

Nine days may refer to:

== Religion ==
- The Nine Days in Judaism

== Books ==
- The Nine Days, account of the General Strike by A. J. Cook 1926
- Nine Days, novel by Toni Jordan 2012
- Nine Days, novel by Fred Hiatt 2013
- Nine Days to Christmas, children's book by Marie Hall Ets and Aurora Labastida 1959
- Nine Days a Queen - The Short Life and Reign of Lady Jane Grey by Ann Rinaldi 2005
- The Nine days of Dunkirk, by David Divine 1959
- Last Nine Days of the Bismarck, by C.S. Forester 1959

== Film and TV ==
- "9 Days" (Brooklyn Nine-Nine), an episode of U.S. sitcom Brooklyn Nine-Nine
- Nine Days (film), a science fiction film
- Nine Days in One Year, a 1962 Soviet drama film directed by Mikhail Romm
- Nine Days that Changed the World, a 2010 documentary film produced by Newt Gingrich

== Music ==
- Nine Days, American rock band

== See also ==
- Nine Days Wonder (disambiguation)
