= List of ambassadors of the United States to the Holy See =

Ambassador of the United States to the Holy See
- Apostolicae Sedis Legatus Civitatum Foederatarum; Ambasciatore della Sede Apostolica negli Stati Uniti
- Seal of the United States Department of State

- Flag of a United States ambassador

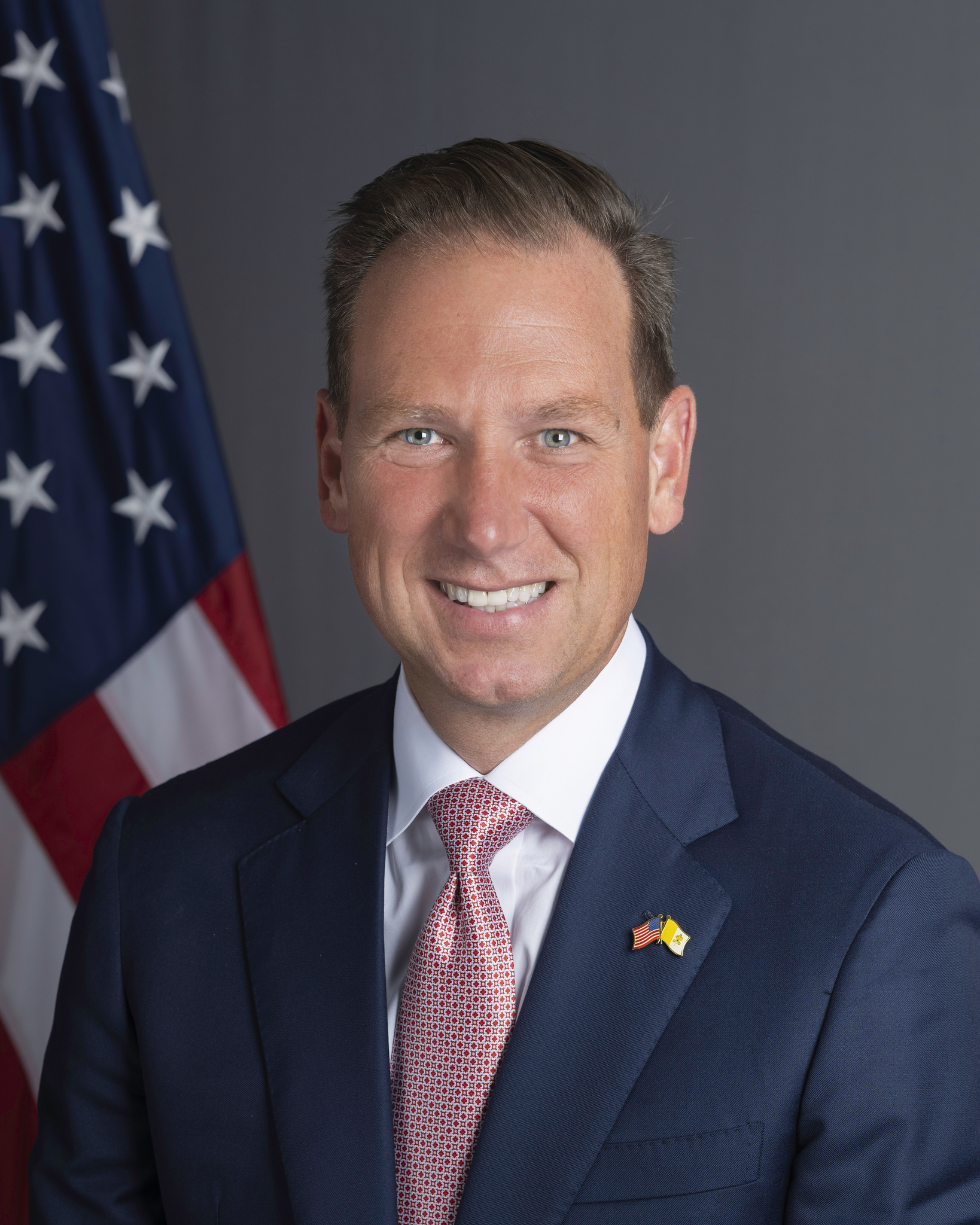
- Incumbent; Brian Burch since September 13, 2025
- Nominator: The president of the United States
- Appointer: The president with Senate advice and consent
- Inaugural holder: William A. Wilson as Ambassador Extraordinary and Plenipotentiary
- Formation: April 9, 1984
- Website: va.usembassy.gov

The ambassador of the United States to the Holy See (Latin: Apostolicae Sedis Legatus Civitatum Foederatarum; Italian: Ambasciatore della Sede Apostolica negli Stati Uniti) is the official representative of the United States of America to the Holy See, the leadership of the Catholic Church. The official representation began with the formal opening of diplomatic relations with the Holy See by President Ronald Reagan and Pope John Paul II in 1984.

Before the establishment of formal diplomatic relations, President Franklin D. Roosevelt's Postmaster General James Farley was the first high-ranking government official to normalize relations with the Holy See in 1933. In addition, Myron Taylor would serve during World War II as an emissary for President Franklin D. Roosevelt. In 1951, President Harry S. Truman's pick of World War II hero Mark W. Clark was defeated.

Between 1951 and 1968, the United States had no official representative accredited to the Holy See. President Richard Nixon changed this when he appointed Henry Cabot Lodge Jr. as his personal representative. President Jimmy Carter followed with the appointment of former New York City mayor Robert F. Wagner Jr. Every ambassador to date has been a member of the Roman Catholic Church. The current ambassador was Brian Burch, who presented his credentials to Pope Leo XIV on September 13, 2025.

The embassy is in Rome, headquartered in a building within the same compound as the U.S. Embassy to Italy.

== History before formal diplomatic relations established ==
The United States had diplomatic relations with the Papal States from 1797 to 1867. The Papal States ceased to exist in 1870, when its last territory (the city of Rome) was lost to the Kingdom of Italy. After that, the international status of the Papacy was controversial until 1929, when the Italian government agreed to the establishment of Vatican City as a sovereign city-state.

The United States was slow to establish full diplomatic relations with the re-established Holy See, partly due to the prevalence of anti-Catholicism in the United States. President Franklin D. Roosevelt's Postmaster General James Farley was the first high-ranking government official to normalize relations with the Holy See in 1933 when the Postmaster General set sail for Europe, along with Soviet Commissar of Foreign Affairs Maxim Litvinoff on the Italian Liner SS Conte di Savoia. In Italy Farley had an audience with Pope Pius XI, and dinner with Cardinal Pacelli, who was to accede to the papacy in 1939. Myron Charles Taylor, an industrialist, philanthropist and diplomat (starting with World War II), served from December 1939 until 1950 as the personal representative of Presidents Franklin D. Roosevelt and Harry S. Truman to the Vatican.

On October 20, 1951, Truman nominated Mark W. Clark, a U.S. Army general and World War II hero, to be emissary to the Holy See. Clark later withdrew his nomination on January 13, 1952, following protests from U.S. Senator Tom Connally from Texas and Protestant groups.

Between 1951 and 1970, the United States had no official representative accredited to the Holy See.

In 1970, President Richard Nixon changed this when he appointed—as his personal representative—Henry Cabot Lodge Jr., a former U.S. Senator from Massachusetts, Nixon's 1960 Republican vice presidential running mate and a former U.S. ambassador (to the United Nations, South Vietnam, and West Germany).

In 1978, President Jimmy Carter followed with the appointment of Robert F. Wagner Jr., a former mayor of New York City and U.S. Ambassador to Spain.

Heads of the U.S. Legation at Rome (1848–1867)
Image	Name and title	Presentation of credentials	Termination of mission
	Jacob L. Martin, Chargé d'Affaires	August 19, 1848	August 26, 1848
	Lewis Cass Jr., Minister Resident	November 19, 1849	November 27, 1858
	John P. Stockton, Minister Resident	November 27, 1858	May 23, 1861
	Alexander Randall, Minister Resident	June 6, 1862	August 4, 1862
	Richard Milford Blatchford, Minister Resident	November 26, 1862	May 20, 1863
	Rufus King, Minister Resident	January 8, 1864	August 17, 1867

== List of envoys serving prior to the establishment of diplomatic relations ==
As no diplomatic relations with the Holy See were allowed by US law between 1867-1984, no Ambassadors were appointed during that period. However, some US Presidents appointed personal envoys to negotiate with the Papacy.

- William Howard Taft, 1902-1903 (later US President)
- Myron Charles Taylor, December 23, 1939-January 18, 1950
- Harold H. Tittmann Jr., December 29, 1941-July 8, 1944 (serving under Taylor)
- Henry Cabot Lodge Jr., June 5, 1970-July 6, 1977
- David M. Walters, July 6, 1977-August 17, 1978
- Robert F. Wagner Jr., November 28, 1978-January 16, 1981
- William Wilson, February 11, 1981-April 9, 1984

== List of ambassadors ==
The following is a list of U.S. ambassadors to the Holy See:

Image	Name	Years served	Pope	U.S. President
	William Wilson (Note: From 1981 to 1984, Wilson was Reagan's personal representative to the Holy See.)	1984–1986	John Paul II	Ronald Reagan
	Frank Shakespeare	1986–1989	John Paul II	Ronald Reagan
	Thomas Patrick Melady	1989–1993	John Paul II	George H. W. Bush
	Raymond Flynn	1993–1997	John Paul II	Bill Clinton
	Lindy Boggs	1997–2001	John Paul II	Bill Clinton
	James Nicholson	2001–2005	John Paul II	George W. Bush
	Francis Rooney	2005–2008	Benedict XVI	George W. Bush
	Mary Ann Glendon	2008–2009	Benedict XVI	George W. Bush
	Miguel H. Díaz	2009–2012	Benedict XVI	Barack Obama
	Mario Mesquita (Chargé d'Affaires)	2012–2013	Benedict XVI	Barack Obama
	Ken Hackett	2013–2017	Francis	Barack Obama
	Callista Gingrich	2017–2021	Francis	Donald Trump
	Patrick Connell (Chargé d'Affaires)	2021–2022	Francis	Joe Biden
	Joe Donnelly	2022–2024	Francis	Joe Biden
	Laura Hochla (Chargé d'Affaires)	2024–2025	Francis	Joe Biden
	Laura Hochla (Chargé d'Affaires)	2024–2025	Francis	Donald Trump
	Laura Hochla (Chargé d'Affaires)	2024–2025	Leo XIV	Donald Trump
	Brian Burch	2025-present	Leo XIV	Donald Trump

== Vacancy controversies ==
In 2009, the post of ambassador remained vacant for several months because of tensions between the Vatican and the Obama Administration over the issues of abortion and same-sex marriage. Three candidates were mentioned, including Caroline Kennedy and Douglas Kmiec.

From November 2012 through mid-2013, the seat was also vacant, after Miguel H. Díaz left the office to teach at the University of Dayton. President Barack Obama nominated Ken Hackett, a longtime president of Catholic Relief Services, for the position in June 2013. Ken Hackett was confirmed by the U.S. Senate as U.S. Ambassador to the Holy See on August 1, 2013.

== See also ==
- Apostolic Nunciature to the United States
- Embassy of the United States to the Holy See
- Holy See–United States relations
