= Ken Hackett =

American diplomat

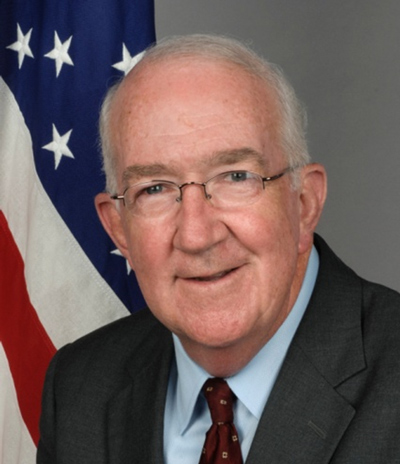

10th United States Ambassador to the Holy See
- In office October 21, 2013 – January 20, 2017
- President: Barack Obama
- Preceded by: Miguel Díaz
- Succeeded by: Callista Gingrich

Personal details
- Born: Kenneth Francis Hackett; January 27, 1947 (age 79) Boston, Massachusetts, U.S.
- Education: Boston College

Kenneth Francis Hackett (born January 27, 1947) served as the United States Ambassador to the Holy See from August 2013 until January 2017. He was previously president of Catholic Relief Services (CRS).

Hackett attended Boston College, graduating in 1968. He then joined the Peace Corps and served in Ghana. Afterwards, he joined Catholic Relief Services (CRS), serving in Africa and Asia. He was named the president of CRS in 1993, retiring in 2011.

He was nominated to the post as Ambassador by President Barack Obama in June 2013 and confirmed by the Senate on August 1, 2013.

He presented his Letters of Credence to Pope Francis on October 21, 2013. In March 2016, he was appointed Knight Grand Cross of the Order of Pius IX, the highest Papal Award given to lay men and women. He took leave as Ambassador to the Holy See on 16 January 2017.

== Awards and honors ==
Hackett received nineteen honorary doctorates from American Catholic universities. The University of Notre Dame awarded him the Laetare Medal in 2012. In 2005, he was appointed to the Board of the Millennium Challenge Corporation, where he served until 2009.

- Knight Commander of the Equestrian Order of St Gregory the Great, Holy See (2004)
- Knight Grand Cross of the Order of Pope Pius IX, Holy See (March 2016)

Diplomatic posts
Preceded by Miguel Díaz	United States Ambassador to the Holy See; 2013–2017	Succeeded by Callista Gingrich
