= Callista Gingrich =

American businesswoman and diplomat (born 1966)

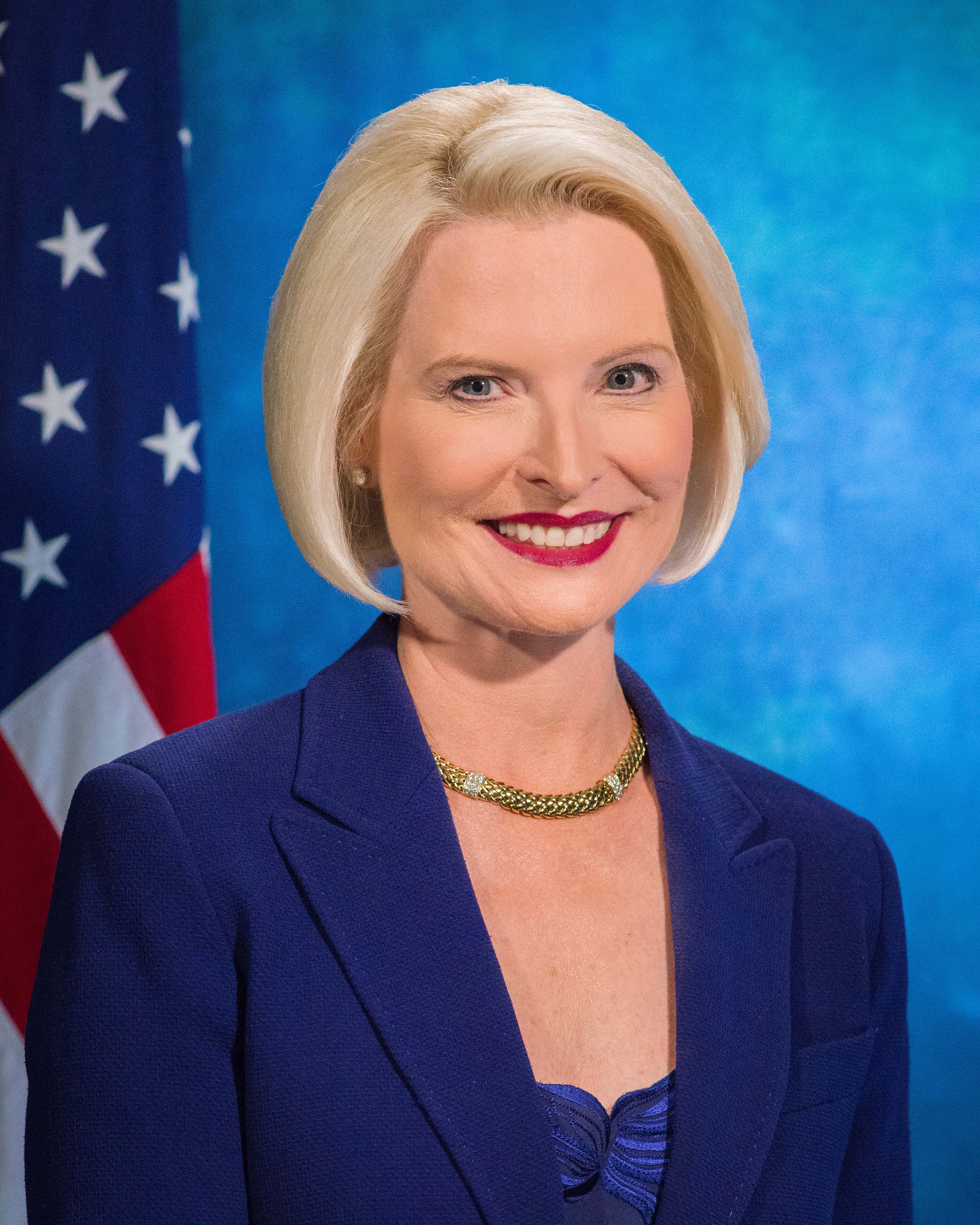
- Official portrait, 2017

United States Ambassador to Switzerland and Liechtenstein
- Incumbent
- Assumed office October 23, 2025
- President: Donald Trump
- Preceded by: Scott Miller

11th United States Ambassador to the Holy See
- In office December 22, 2017 – January 20, 2021
- President: Donald Trump
- Preceded by: Ken Hackett
- Succeeded by: Joe Donnelly

Personal details
- Born: Callista Louise Bisek; March 4, 1966 (age 60) Whitehall, Wisconsin, U.S.
- Party: Republican
- Spouse: Newt Gingrich (m. 2000)
- Education: Luther College (BA)
- Website: Gingrich 360
- Callista Gingrich's voice Callista Gingrich speaks on religious freedom and women's rights. Recorded July 25, 2018

Callista Louise Gingrich (née Bisek; born March 4, 1966) is an American diplomat, businesswoman, author, and documentary film producer who is the United States ambassador to Switzerland and Liechtenstein. She served as the United States ambassador to the Holy See from 2017 to 2021.

She has also served as president and chief executive officer of Gingrich 360, a multimedia production and consulting company based in Arlington, Virginia and is married to former House speaker and 2012 Republican presidential candidate Newt Gingrich.

== Early life ==
Callista Louise Bisek, known as "Cally Lou" to her family, was born to Alphonse Emil Bisek and Bernita (Krause) Bisek, in Whitehall, Wisconsin. Her father worked in a packing plant and her mother was a secretary. Her father is of Polish descent and her mother is of Swiss descent.

She graduated as valedictorian from Whitehall Memorial High School in 1984. A music student from childhood, Callista attended Luther College in Decorah, Iowa, majoring in music and becoming a member of Pi Kappa Lambda. She graduated cum laude in 1988.

== Career ==
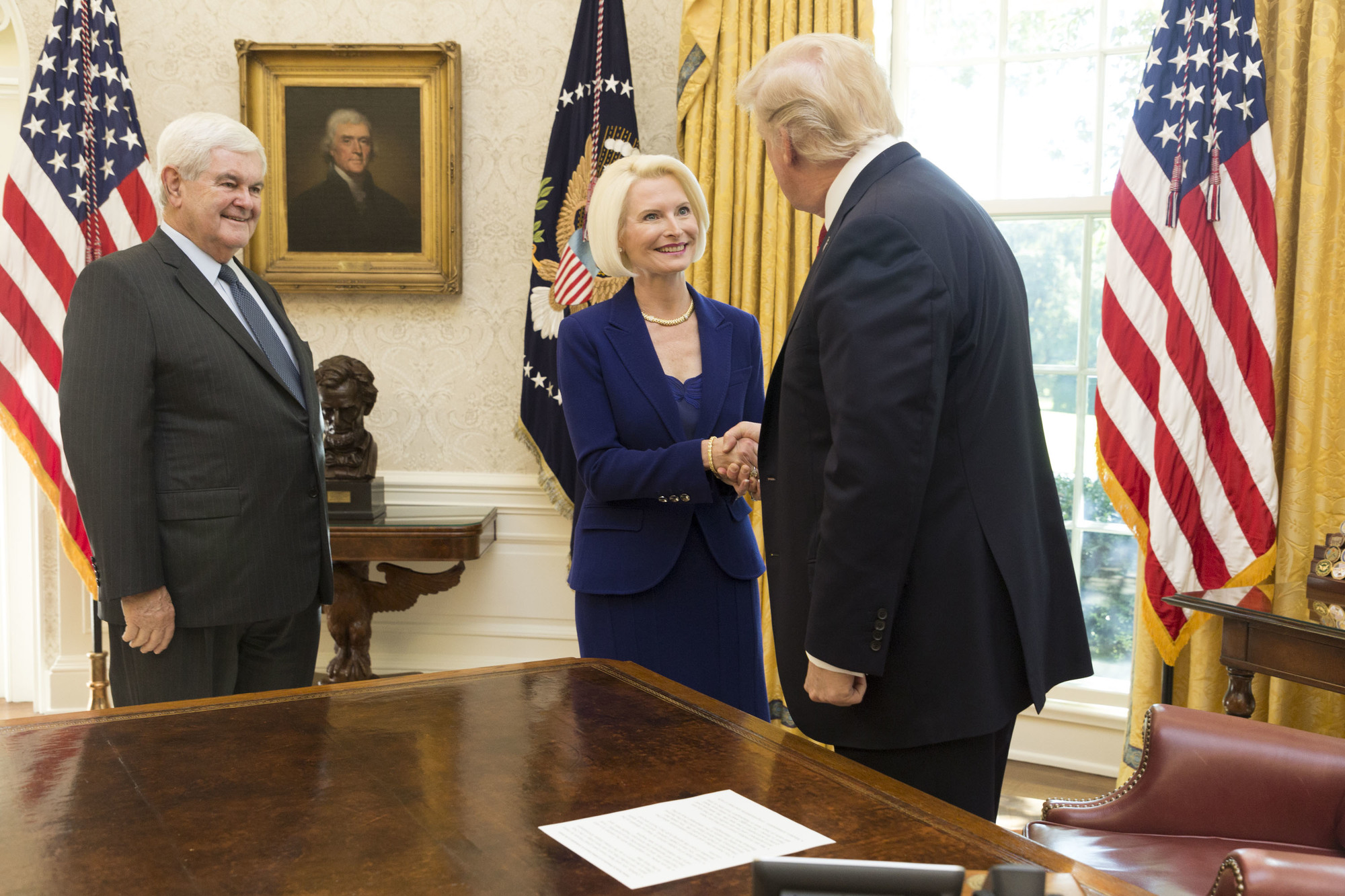
Gingrich meeting with President Donald Trump, 24 October 2017

In 1988, just out of college, Gingrich accepted an internship in Washington, D.C., in the office of Republican Congressman Steve Gunderson. At the end of the internship she joined Gunderson's congressional staff where she worked until 1995. In 1995, she moved to the House Committee on Agriculture where she worked as chief clerk until 2007.

=== Multimedia productions ===
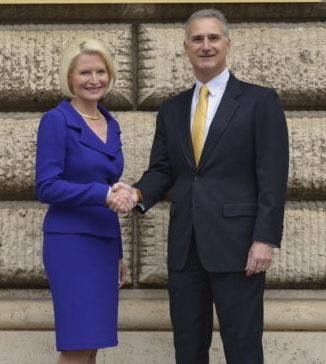
Gingrich arrived in Rome on November 6, 2017, for the ambassadorship.

After leaving the House Committee on Agriculture in 2007, Gingrich served as president of Gingrich Productions, a multimedia production company which she founded with her husband. They produce historical and public policy documentary films, publish books and newsletters, and make speeches, television, and radio appearances.

Together, they hosted ten documentaries, including Journey to America, The First American, Divine Mercy: The Canonization of John Paul II, A City Upon A Hill, America at Risk, Nine Days that Changed the World, Ronald Reagan: Rendezvous with Destiny, Rediscovering God in America, Rediscovering God in America II: Our Heritage, and We Have the Power. The films have sold several thousand copies.

Gingrich authored seven children's books featuring Ellis the Elephant, including Sweet Land of Liberty, about American exceptionalism, and Land of the Pilgrims' Pride, about colonial America. Both were on The New York Times Best Seller list of Children's Picture Books. Yankee Doodle Dandy, about the American Revolution, was released in 2013. From Sea to Shining Sea, about the expedition of Lewis and Clark and the early years of the United States, was released in October 2014. Christmas in America, about the history of Christmas in the United States, was released in October 2015. Hail to the Chief, about United States presidents, was released in October 2016. Remember the Ladies, about United States first ladies, was released in October 2017.

Gingrich co-authored Rediscovering God in America with her husband, Newt Gingrich. She also co-authored a photobook, Ronald Reagan: Rendezvous with Destiny, with Newt Gingrich and Dave Bossie. Gingrich is the voice for several of her husband's audiobooks.

=== Ambassador ===
President Donald Trump nominated Gingrich to be the United States Ambassador to the Holy See in May 2017, and the United States Senate confirmed the nomination on October 16, 2017. On December 22, 2017, Gingrich presented her credentials to Pope Francis and officially assumed the duties of United States Ambassador to the Holy See. She was the 11th U.S. Ambassador to the Holy See since formal relations were established in 1984 under President Ronald Reagan.

Gingrich assumed the role of Ambassador after several instances of high-profile criticism of Donald Trump and his policies by Pope Francis and his allies. During her tenure, Gingrich focused on advancing areas of common ground between Washington and the Vatican, including defending religious freedom and combatting human trafficking. In June 2018, Gingrich helped return a letter written by Christopher Columbus that had been stolen from the Vatican Archives. She also highlighted the role of women religious on the frontlines of the COVID-19 pandemic and in conflict zones and helped Samaritan's Purse bring an emergency field hospital, doctors and nurses to an area of northern Italy hit hard by COVID-19.

In December 2024, Trump nominated her to be United States Ambassador to Switzerland, a post to which she was confirmed in September 2025.

== Awards and honors ==
In February 2018, Gingrich was awarded an honorary doctorate from the Ave Maria School of Law.

In 2019, she received the Sue M. Cobb Award, one of the highest recognitions at the U.S. Department of State for exemplary diplomatic service.

In June 2020, Gingrich was appointed Dame Grand Cross of the Order of Pius IX by Pope Francis, the highest distinction conferred by the Holy See on laypersons, in recognition of her contributions to the Church and society.

In 2023, she received a Luther College Distinguished Service Award for admirable service to society.

And in 2024, she received the Ellis Island Medal of Honor for distinguished service.

== 2012 Republican primaries ==
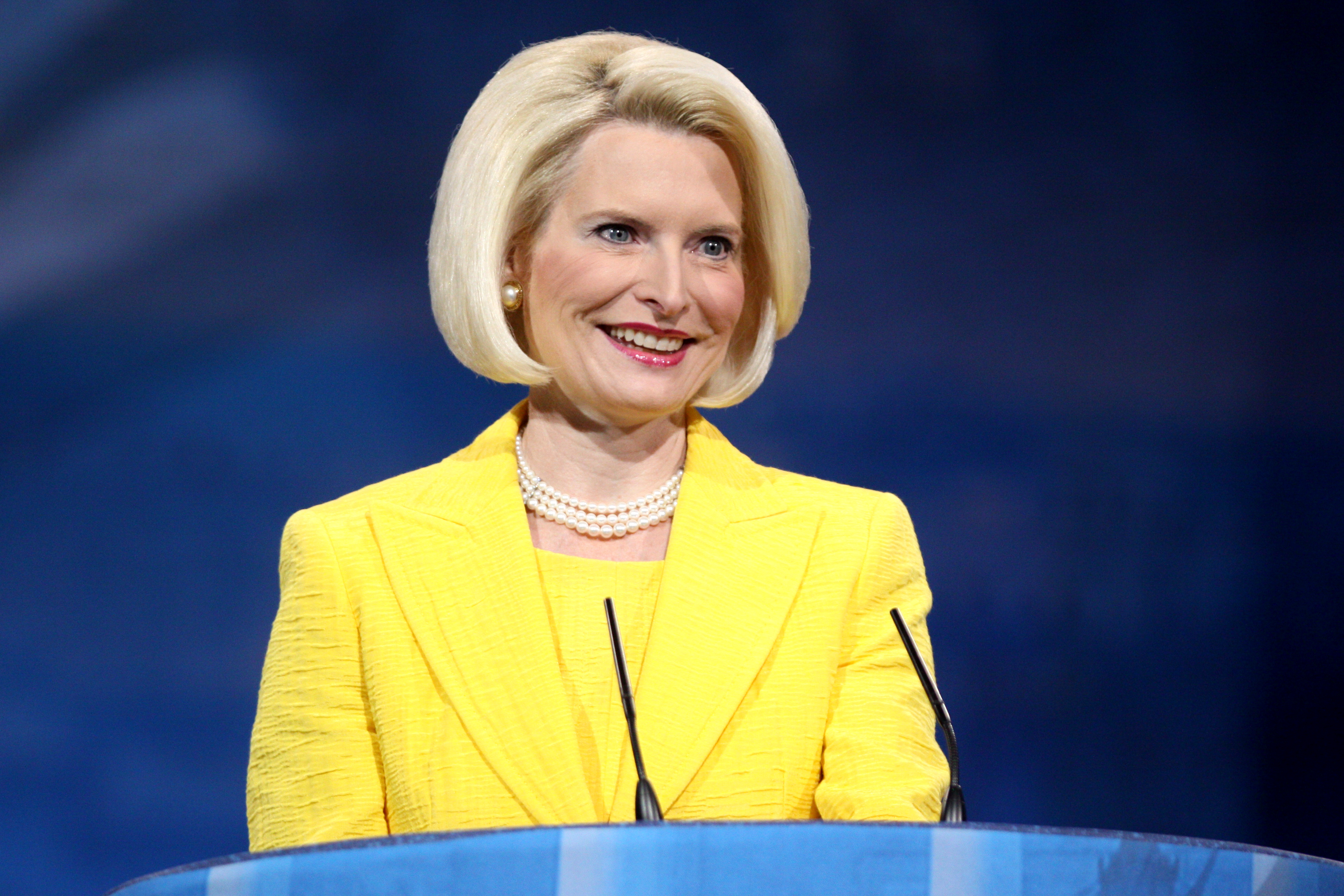
Callista Gingrich speaking at the Conservative Political Action Conference in National Harbor, Maryland

As part of her husband's bid to become the Republican nominee in the 2012 presidential election, Gingrich often appeared by his side at rallies. In early 2012, Gingrich began to take a more active role in the campaign, and undertook her first campaign speaking appearances without her husband. On February 10, she appeared at the Conservative Political Action Conference, giving an introduction to her husband prior to his speech. In addition, she supported his campaign through speaking appearances at Republican women's groups, meetings of Gingrich supporters, and various rallies.

== Other activities ==
Gingrich serves as president of the Gingrich Foundation. She also serves as a Member of the Basilica of the National Shrine of the Immaculate Conception Board of Trustees, a Member of the Ave Maria School of Law Board of Governors, a Member of the Richard Nixon Foundation Board of Directors, and a Member of the Ave Maria Mutual Funds Catholic Advisory Board.

== Personal life ==
Callista Bisek met Newt Gingrich in 1993 when he was House Minority Whip and she was working in the office of Congressman Steve Gunderson. Callista testified in 1999 as part of Gingrich's divorce proceedings that the couple began a six-year affair in 1993 while Newt was married to his second wife, Marianne.

Newt divorced Marianne in December 1999, and on August 18, 2000, Callista and Newt were married in a private ceremony in Alexandria, Virginia. In 2002, Newt Gingrich asked the Catholic Archdiocese of Atlanta to annul his 19-year marriage to Marianne on the basis that she had been previously married. Callista, a lifelong Catholic, was instrumental in her husband's conversion to that faith in 2009. The Gingriches live in McLean, Virginia.

== See also ==
- List of ambassadors appointed in the first Trump presidency
- List of ambassadors appointed in the second Trump presidency
- List of female ambassadors of the United States

Diplomatic posts
Preceded by Ken Hackett	United States Ambassador to the Holy See; 2017–2021	Succeeded by Patrick Connell; Chargé d'Affaires
