= Miguel H. Díaz =

American diplomat

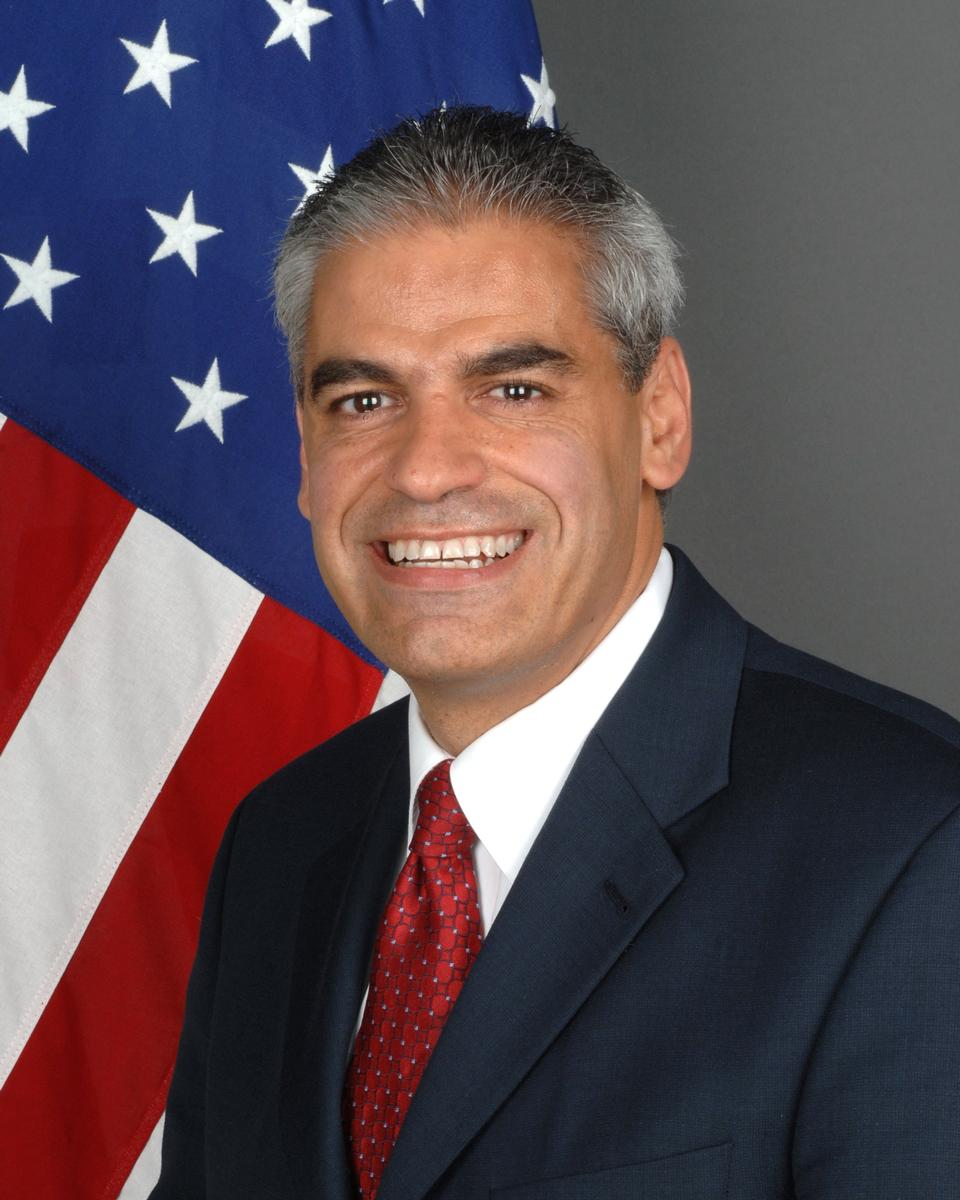

9th United States Ambassador to the Holy See
- In office October 2, 2009 – November 10, 2012
- President: Barack Obama
- Preceded by: Mary Ann Glendon
- Succeeded by: Ken Hackett

Personal details
- Born: September 29, 1963 (age 63)
- Profession: Diplomat

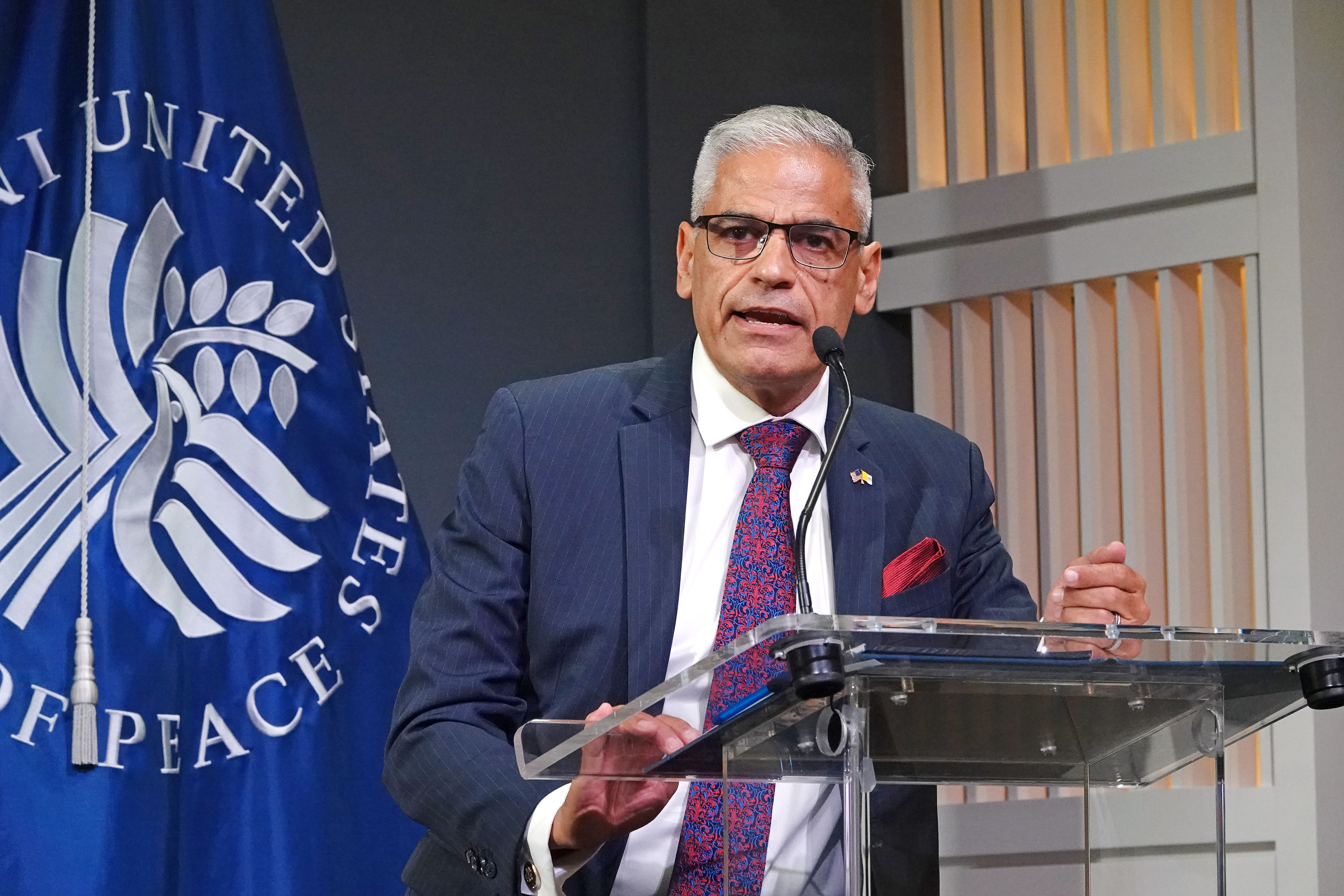
Díaz in 2024

Miguel Humberto Díaz (born September 29, 1963) is an Cuban-born American theologian, diplomat and commentator who served as United States Ambassador to the Holy See. He was nominated by President Barack Obama and confirmed by the U.S. Senate on August 5, 2009. He resigned on November 5, 2012, and was immediately named University Professor of Faith and Culture at the University of Dayton. He was the first Hispanic U.S. Ambassador accredited to the Holy See.

As ambassador, Díaz helped launch the Religion in Foreign Policy Working Group of the Secretary of State's Strategic Dialogue with Civil Society. The Working Group facilitates regular dialogue between the U.S. foreign policy establishment and religious leaders, scholars, and practitioners worldwide on strategies to build more effective partnerships on issues such as conflict prevention, humanitarian assistance and national security.

On May 20, 2014, Loyola University Chicago announced that they intended to hire Díaz as a professor despite a University of Dayton harassment allegation. A spokesman for Loyola said in an email, "We have reviewed the allegations raised against Miguel Diaz and our offer to him stands." He became a professor at Loyola on July 1, 2014.

== Early life and education ==
Díaz was born in Havana, Cuba, and he and his family departed for Spain when he was nine. Two years later, he immigrated to Florida. He comes from a modest background; his father worked as a waiter and his mother worked as a data entry clerk. Díaz holds a B.A. from St. Thomas University and an M.A. and a Ph.D. in theology from the University of Notre Dame.

== Career ==
Prior to his service as ambassador, he was a professor of theology at the College of Saint Benedict and Saint John's University in Minnesota. Díaz is the co-editor of the book From the Heart of Our People: Explorations in Catholic Systematic Theology and author of On Being Human: U.S. Hispanic and Rahnerian Perspectives, named "Best Book of the Year" by the Hispanic Theological Initiative at Princeton Theological Seminary. Díaz has taught religious studies and theology at Barry University, the University of Dayton and the University of Notre Dame. From 2001 to 2003, he taught and served as academic dean at St. Vincent de Paul Regional Seminary in Boynton Beach, Florida. He is a board member of the Catholic Theological Society of America (CTSA) and past president of the Academy of Catholic Hispanic Theologians of the United States (ACHTUS).

Conservative news outlet Newsmax claimed that Díaz was rejected by the Vatican several times. However, Time magazine said that the story was false.

He presented his credentials on October 2, 2009, and served until November 10, 2012.

== Theology ==
Building on the work of Karl Rahner, Díaz has placed extensive emphasis on the role of the Trinity in history. Along with theologians such as Catherine LaCugna, Díaz argues that the life of God cannot be considered apart from history, but must be conceived as "for us, and for our salvation." In this vein, he has also asserted that in the contemporary American context, God can be seen vividly "in the face of migrants," who face the dangers of economic insecurity, violence, and social marginalization in search of a better life.

== Speeches ==
Díaz gave his first speech on U.S. soil as ambassador on Friday, February 5, 2010, at St. John Vianney College Seminary in Miami, Fl. He spoke at the seminary's 11th Annual Fides et Ratio Conference on the relations between the U.S. Government and the Holy See. Ambassador Díaz attended St. John Vianney College Seminary and obtained a certificate in Pre-Theology.

He received several honorary doctorates while serving as ambassador.

After joining the University of Dayton, he was sought for analysis and comment by the national news media, especially upon the resignation of Pope Benedict XVI in February 2013. He currently holds the John Courtney Murray University Chair in Public Service at Loyola University Chicago where he continues to be sought by multiple media outlets for analysis and commentary.

Diplomatic posts
Preceded by Mary Ann Glendon	U. S. Ambassador to the Holy See; 2009–2012	Succeeded by Ken Hackett
