= Patrick Connell =

American diplomat

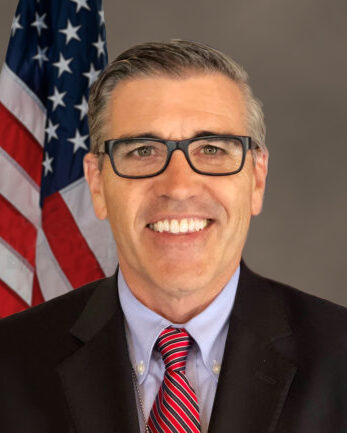

Chargé d’Affaires ad interim of the United States Embassy to the Holy See
- In office January 20, 2021 – February 15, 2022
- President: Joe Biden
- Preceded by: Callista Gingrich (Ambassador)
- Succeeded by: Joe Donnelly (Ambassador)

Personal details
- Born: Patrick Connell Westford, Massachusetts, U.S.
- Spouse: Hyrije Kryeziu Connell

Patrick Connell is an American diplomat who assumed the role of Chargé d’Affaires ad interim at the Embassy of the United States to the Holy See under the Biden administration on January 20, 2021, succeeding former ambassador Callista Gingrich. Connell is currently a career member of the United States Foreign Service and previously served as Deputy Chief of Mission at the embassy from July 2020 until his promotion.

== Early life ==
Patrick Connell was born in Westford, Massachusetts. He earned a Bachelor of Arts in Religious Studies and English from Villanova University and a Juris Doctor from Villanova University School of Law.

== Awards ==
Connell has received several State Department Superior and Meritorious Honor Awards and was awarded the Sinclaire Language Award for Greek and Turkish in 2015.
