= Nine Days Wonder =

A nine-day wonder is an event that gains attention for a short amount of time, and is then abandoned.

Nine Days Wonder may refer to:

- Kempes Nine Daies Wonder (1600) – pamphlet in which William Kempe morris danced from London to Norwich
- "The Nine Days Wonder" – (1975) episode of the period drama Upstairs, Downstairs
- A Nine Days' Wonder (1875) – play by Charles Hamilton Aide
- "A Nine Days' Wonder" (2005) – Japanese pop song by Akeboshi
- "A Nine Days Wonder" (2009) – song by Theatre of Tragedy from their album Forever Is the World
