= Nine Days that Changed the World =

- Directed by: Kevin Knoblock
- Written by: Kevin Knoblock
- Produced by: Newt Gingrich; Callista Gingrich
- Starring: Pope John Paul II
- Release date: 2010
- Running time: 94 minutes
- Country: United States
- Language: English

Nine Days that Changed the World is a 2010 documentary film produced by Newt Gingrich and his wife Callista that centers on the role played by Pope John Paul II in the fall of Communism in Europe and the rise of labour union Solidarity.
