= Frank J. Shakespeare =

American businessman and diplomat (1925–2022)

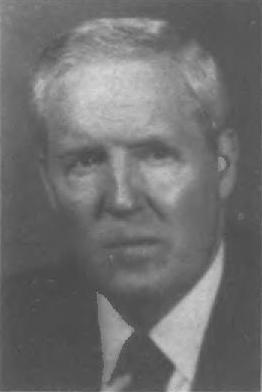

2nd United States Ambassador to Holy See
- In office January 8, 1987 – July 28, 1989
- President: Ronald Reagan; George H. W. Bush
- Preceded by: William A. Wilson
- Succeeded by: Thomas Patrick Melady

16th United States Ambassador to Portugal
- In office October 16, 1985 – October 4, 1986
- President: Ronald Reagan
- Preceded by: H. Allen Holmes
- Succeeded by: Edward Morgan Rowell

Personal details
- Born: April 9, 1925 New York City, U.S.
- Died: December 14, 2022 (aged 97) Deerfield, Wisconsin, U.S.
- Party: Republican
- Education: College of the Holy Cross (BS)
- Occupation: Diplomat, business executive

Francis Joseph Shakespeare (April 9, 1925 – December 14, 2022) was an American diplomat, political consultant and media executive. He was a vice president of the CBS network, and an executive vice president, before entering public service. He served as the United States ambassador to Portugal from 1985 to 1986 and the United States ambassador to the Holy See from 1986 to 1989. He later served as an honorary member of the board of trustees for The Heritage Foundation.

== Early life and education ==
Born in New York City to Francis and Frances (née Hughes) Shakespeare on April 9, 1925, and raised in the Catholic faith, Shakespeare graduated from the College of the Holy Cross in 1946 with a Bachelor of Science. He also served in the U.S. Navy from 1945 to 1946.

== Career ==
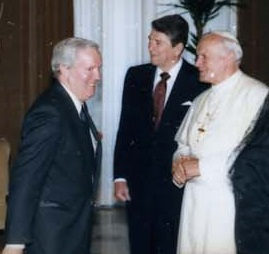
Shakespeare (left) with Pope John Paul II and Ronald Reagan in 1987 at the Apostolic Palace

Shakespeare was vice president of CBS in New York City from 1963 to 1965, then executive vice president from 1965 to 1967, when he was appointed by President Richard Nixon as director of the United States Information Agency. After serving in this capacity from 1969-1973, he returned to the private sector as executive vice president of Westinghouse in New York. In 1975 he became vice chairman of RKO General.

In 1981 President Ronald Reagan named him chairman of the Board for International Broadcasting, the entity which oversaw the operations of Radio Free Europe. He held this position until 1985, when Reagan appointed him United States Ambassador to Portugal. The following year, in September 1986, Shakespeare was appointed United States Ambassador to the Holy See.

From 1979, Shakespeare was an honorary member of the board of trustees for The Heritage Foundation, a Washington, D.C.–based public policy research institute. He also served as a trustee of the Lynde and Harry Bradley Foundation of Milwaukee, Wisconsin.

== Awards ==
Shakespeare was awarded honorary degrees in engineering from the Colorado School of Mines in 1975, in commercial science from Pace University in 1979, and in law from Sacred Heart University in 1985.

== Personal life ==
Shakespeare was divorced and had one son and two daughters. He served the Catholic Church as a member of the Sovereign Military Order of Malta. He died on December 14, 2022, at age 97.

Diplomatic posts
Preceded by Henry Allen Holmes	U. S. Ambassador to Portugal; 1985–1986	Succeeded by Edward Morgan Rowell
Preceded by William Wilson	U. S. Ambassador to the Holy See; 1986–1989	Succeeded by Thomas Patrick Melady
