= Pope Pius IX and the United States =

The relationship between Pope Pius IX and the United States was an important aspect of the pontiff's foreign policy and Church growth program.

== Period of steady immigration ==
Together with German and Italian immigrants, the Catholic population in the United States increased from 4 percent at the beginning of the pontificate of Pius IX in 1846 to 11 percent in 1870. Some 700 priests existed in the U.S. in 1846 compared to 6000 in 1878. Pope Pius IX contributed to this development by establishing new Church regions and the installation of capable American bishops.

== Creation of modern ecclesiastical structures ==
Pius IX is the father of much of the modern American church structure by creating many existing dioceses and archdioceses in the U.S. such as the Roman Catholic Dioceses of Portland, Springfield, Illinois, Burlington, Cleveland, Columbus, Galveston-Houston, Providence, Fort Wayne-South Bend, Kansas City in Kansas, Saint Paul and Minneapolis, San Francisco, Seattle, San Antonio and others. Some of his creations do not exist anymore: On 24 July 1846, Pius IX divided the existing Oregon vicariate apostolic into three dioceses: Oregon City (Oregonopolitanus); Walla Walla (Valle Valliensis); and Vancouver Island (Insula Vancouver).

== New sees in the Western states ==
On 29 July 1850, the Diocese of Oregon City was elevated to an archdiocese with Archbishop Blanchet continuing to serve as its first archbishop. In 1850, Pius IX erected seats at Monterey and Santa Fe in the Spanish-Mexican territories recently added to the United States and in Savannah, Wheeling, and Nesqually, and made the Indian Territory a vicariate under a bishop.

== Support for synods and meetings ==
Pius IX supported Diocesan synods and regular meetings, and granted all wishes of the American bishops regarding enlargements of their rights and privileges. In 1849, from his exile in Gaeta, he politely turned down an invitation to visit the U.S. He wrote, "...nothing could afford us more pleasure, nothing could be more grateful to our hearts than to enjoy the presence and conversation of yourself and the venerable brethren ... but in the existing times and circumstances, it would be impossible for us to comply with your invitation, as your wisdom will easily understand".

The enormous growth of the Catholic Church in the U.S. and the genuine admiration in the early years for his liberal pontificate resulted in the United States establishing diplomatic relations with the Papal States on 7 April 1848. This lasted until 1867, when domestic pressures forced a closing of relations. The Vatican never had an ambassador in Washington, because the U.S. government refused to accept a Catholic priest as papal nuncio.

Pius IX pushed for an American College in Rome for future American priests and promised his personal financial support. A small college was founded in 1859 under Rev John McCloskey; it was greatly expanded under Pius XII in 1956.

== Political involvement during the Civil War ==
During the American Civil War, Catholics oriented themselves to John Hughes (the Archbishop of New York) in the Union and to Jean-Marie Odin (the Archbishop of New Orleans) in the Confederate States. Abraham Lincoln asked Pope Pius IX to elevate Hughes into the College of Cardinals, but Pius declined to do so. A decade later, Pius did elevate John McCloskey, Hughes's successor, to the College of Cardinals.

Historian Don H. Doyle writes, "During the American Civil War, the pope ... urged American bishops to call for peace at a time when peace meant separation, and privately he expressed strong sympathies with the South. The Confederacy sent envoys to enlist Pio Nono [Pius IX] in their cause and came away boasting the most powerful pontiff in Europe had recognized the Confederacy. The pope said nothing to refute such claims...." Specifically, Confederate diplomat Ambrose Dudley Mann met with the pope in December 1863 and received a letter addressed to the "Honorable President of the Confederate States of America." This was simple courtesy, though it had no legal effect. The Confederacy used it in propaganda to claim papal support. For example, Robert E. Lee called the pope "the only sovereign... in Europe who recognized our poor Confederacy". In fact, no diplomatic relations or recognitions were extended in either direction. In his dispatch to Richmond, Mann claimed a great diplomatic achievement for himself; he believed the letter was "a positive recognition of our Government". Confederate Secretary of State Judah P. Benjamin told Mann it was "a mere inferential recognition, unconnected with political action or the regular establishment of diplomatic relations" and thus did not assign it the weight of formal recognition.

After the end of the war, Pope Pius IX sent an inscribed photograph of himself to the imprisoned former president of the Confederacy, Jefferson Davis. (Note: The pope's photograph was inscribed Venite ad me omnes qui laboratis, et ego reficiam vos, dicit Dominus [Come unto me all that are heavy laden and I will refresh you, says the Lord].)
