= Embassy of the United States to the Holy See =

- Location: Via Sallustiana, 49; Rome, Italy
- Coordinates: 41.9066051°N 12.4918327°E
- Opened: 1994; 32 years ago
- Ambassador: Brian Burch
- Website: Official website

The Embassy of the United States of America to the Holy See (Latin: Legatio ad Sanctam Sedem Civitatum Foederatarum Americae) or Embassy Vatican for short, is the diplomatic mission of United States of America to the Holy See, a term referring to the central government and universal reach of the Roman Catholic Church.

The current embassy moved to new headquarters in September 2015 in a separate building on the same compound as the United States Embassy Rome. The embassy was previously located on Aventine Hill in the Villa Domiziana in Rome, Italy, which was built as a private residence in 1953. In 1994, the U.S. government acquired the property as the new chancery for embassy. On August 2, 2025, Brian Burch, cofounder of the organization CatholicVote.org, was confirmed by the United States Senate by a vote of 49–44 to be the next ambassador to the Holy See.

The embassy is a part of the "Tri-Mission Community" in Rome, the other two being the Embassy of the United States, Rome and the United States Mission to the U.N. Agencies in Rome.

== History ==
Formal diplomatic relations with the Holy See were established in 1984 by President Ronald Reagan and Pope John Paul II. The mission works in partnership with the Holy See on global issues including: democracy, peace, and security; trafficking in persons; interreligious dialogue; development and foreign aid; and human rights.

This facility became the focus of an unexpected controversy when it was falsely reported on November 27, 2013, that the Embassy would be closed. The embassy was set to be transferred in January 2015 to a larger building adjacent to the U.S. Embassy to Italy for reasons of cost, security, and proximity to the Vatican itself. However, as part of a broader push to cut security for U.S. embassies, Congress blocked the move in 2014. The Embassy of the United States to the Holy See, previously located on Aventine Hill, moved to new headquarters in September 2015 in a separate building on the same compound as the United States Embassy Rome.
