= CatholicVote.org =

Roman Catholic conservative political group

CatholicVote
- Founded: 2008
- Type: 501(c)(4) non-profit
- Purpose: Roman Catholic political advocacy
- Location: Madison, Wisconsin, U.S.
- Region served: United States
- Key people: Kelsey Reinhardt (president); Joshua Mercer (co-founder, vice president Brian Burch (co-founder, senior advisor)
- Website: www.CatholicVote.org

CatholicVote.org is a conservative, non-profit political advocacy group based in the United States. While the organization acknowledges the authority of the Magisterium, it is independent of the Catholic Church.

== Structure ==
CatholicVote.org is divided into three organizations:

- CatholicVote.org, a project of Fidelis, a Catholic organization.
- CatholicVote.org Political Action Committee (CatholicVote PAC) is the group's connected political action committee; its goal is to financially support political candidates who "will be faithful stewards of Catholic social teaching and the common good". In 2010, it made campaign contributions to six Republicans and one Democrat.
- CatholicVote.org Education Fund is a 501(c)3 tax-deductible program which comprises two units: the CatholicVote.org Education Fund and the CatholicVote.org Legal Action Fund.

== History ==
The CatholicVote.org domain name was first used by the Catholic Alliance in early 2000. The Catholic Alliance was a group of Americans who agreed with the platform of the fundamentalist evangelical Protestant Christian Coalition but wished to widen the Coalition's scope to include Catholics. In mid-2002, Larry Cirignano obtained the domain name. Cirignano was the founder of Catholic Vote, later called Catholic Citizenship. In October 2008, the domain name was obtained by the Fidelis Center for Law and Policy, a non-profit organisation. The first published articles on the site included ones by co-founders Brian Burch and Joshua Mercer. The Fidelis Center subsequently sold the domain to Fidelis, a related, but independent 501(c)4 organization.

== Activism ==
=== Marriage and sexuality ===
On June 25, 2015, one day before same-sex marriage became legal everywhere in the United States, CatholicVote.org uploaded a video onto YouTube called "Not Alone". The video features Catholic people who oppose same-sex marriage defending this belief, saying that people should not hate or dislike those who oppose same-sex marriage. It quickly received a million views on YouTube, where it received a massive backlash due to the video's message. On YouTube, "Not Alone" received many more dislikes than likes. Parodies of the video appeared very quickly. According to Catholic News Agency, many websites condemned the video, calling the participants "bigots" or "anti-gay". CatholicVote.org president Brian Burch said "literally tens of thousands of people are emailing, saying: 'thank you for speaking up for me. I don't agree with the Supreme Court decision, but I don't hate anyone.' "

In June 2022, CatholicVote.org urged parents to check out any LGBT-themed books from their local libraries so that no children would be able to see them.

=== Anti-abortion ===
"Imagine Spot 1" was the first release of the national media campaign "Life: Imagine the Potential" in 2009. In ten days it recorded over 700,000 hits. The commercial centers around the story of President Barack Obama, showing an ultrasound image and saying that despite a hard childhood, the unborn child will grow up to be President of the United States. The advert was rejected by both NBC for airing during the Super Bowl and CNN for airing during coverage of President Obama's first State of the Union Address.

A second commercial was also released in 2009, "Imagine Spot 2". This commercial featured Nelson Mandela. It aired in selected markets during the American Idol season 8 finale.

=== Other activism ===
In 2010, CatholicVote.org organized a petition urging the United States Postal Service to issue a Mother Teresa commemorative stamp despite opposition by the Freedom From Religion Foundation and similar groups.

== See also ==
- Catholic Church and politics in the United States
- Homosexuality and Roman Catholicism
- Catholic Church and abortion
- American Life League
