= Brian Burch =

American Catholic activist and diplomat (born 1975)

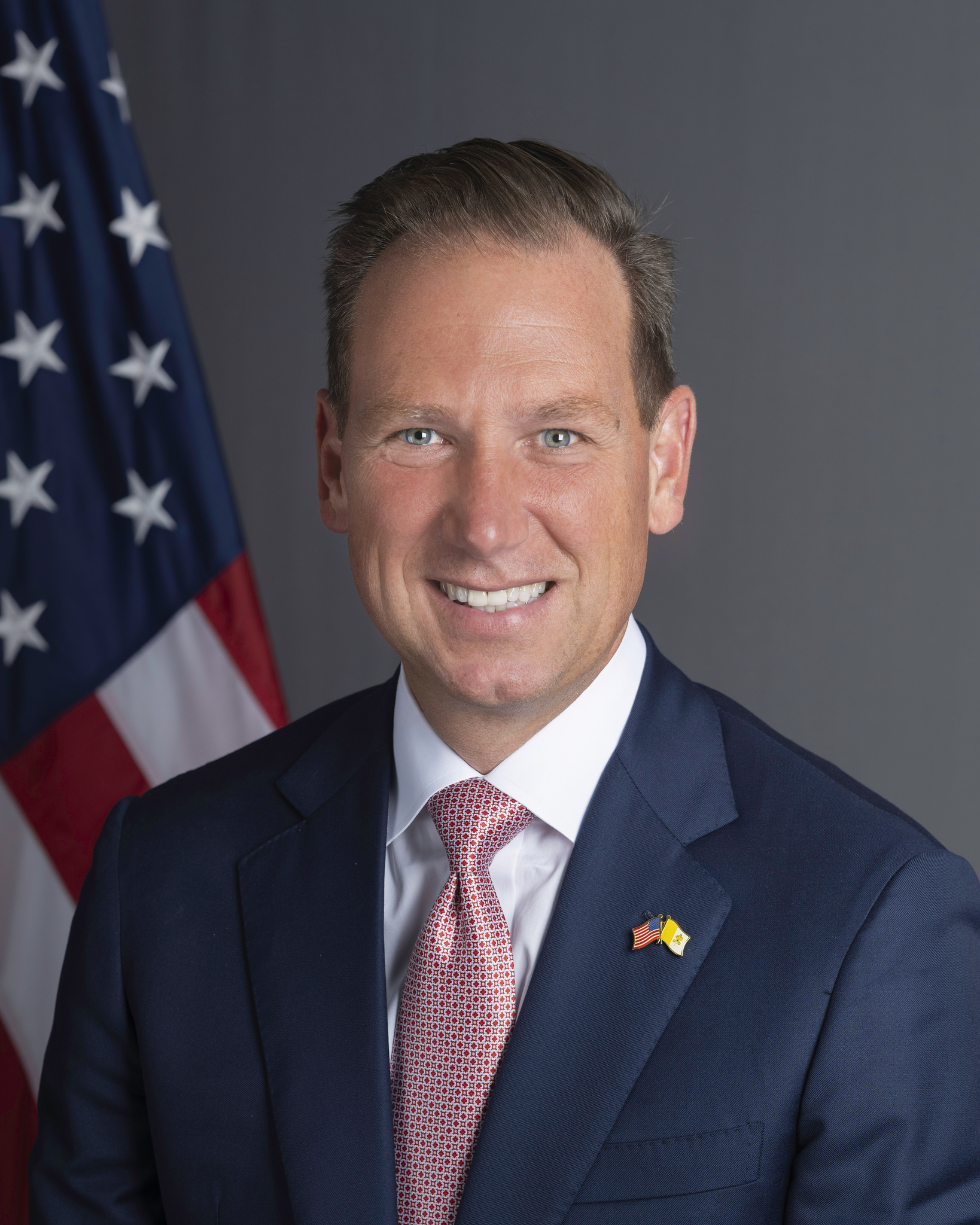
- Official portrait, 2025

13th United States Ambassador to the Holy See
- Incumbent
- Assumed office September 13, 2025
- President: Donald Trump
- Preceded by: Joe Donnelly

Personal details
- Born: Brian Francis Burch II; July 7, 1975 (age 51) Phoenix, Arizona, U.S.
- Party: Republican
- Spouse: Sara Burch
- Children: 9
- Education: University of Dallas (BA)

Brian Francis Burch II (born July 7, 1975) is an American diplomat and Catholic activist serving as the 13th United States ambassador to the Holy See since 2025. He was the president of CatholicVote.org from its founding in 2008 to June 2025.

== Early life and education ==
Burch has a background in Catholic advocacy and political engagement. He received a Bachelor of Arts from the University of Dallas in 1997.

== Career ==
Burch is the co-founder and president of CatholicVote, a conservative political advocacy group focused on Catholic issues in the United States. He has been involved in efforts to mobilize Catholic voters and advocate for policies aligned with the organization's mission.

Burch also serves as the president of the Seton Montessori School board in Villa Park, Illinois.

== Nomination and ambassadorship ==
On December 20, 2024, President-elect Donald Trump announced Burch as his nominee for U.S. ambassador to the Holy See. Burch stated that, if confirmed, he would work to "promote the dignity of all people and the common good". Burch's confirmation was delayed for several months due to Senator Brian Schatz's "blanket hold" on Trump appointments; Burch was confirmed to the position following a party-line vote on August 2. After being sworn in on August 23, he was received by Edgar Peña Parra on September 3 and Pope Leo XIV on September 13; he presented a birthday cake to the Pope with his letter of credence.

On December 24, 2025, Burch was summoned by Cardinal Pietro Parolin to press for details on America's plans in Venezuela. Parolin had been seeking a meeting with Secretary of State Marco Rubio. In his conversation with Burch, Parolin said Russia was ready to grant Maduro asylum and urged US authorities toward that solution.

== Personal life ==
Burch lives in Lombard, Illinois, with his wife, Sara, and their nine children.

Diplomatic posts
Preceded by Joe Donnelly	United States Ambassador to the Holy See; 2025–present	Incumbent
