= William A. Wilson (diplomat) =

American businessman and diplomat (1914–2009)

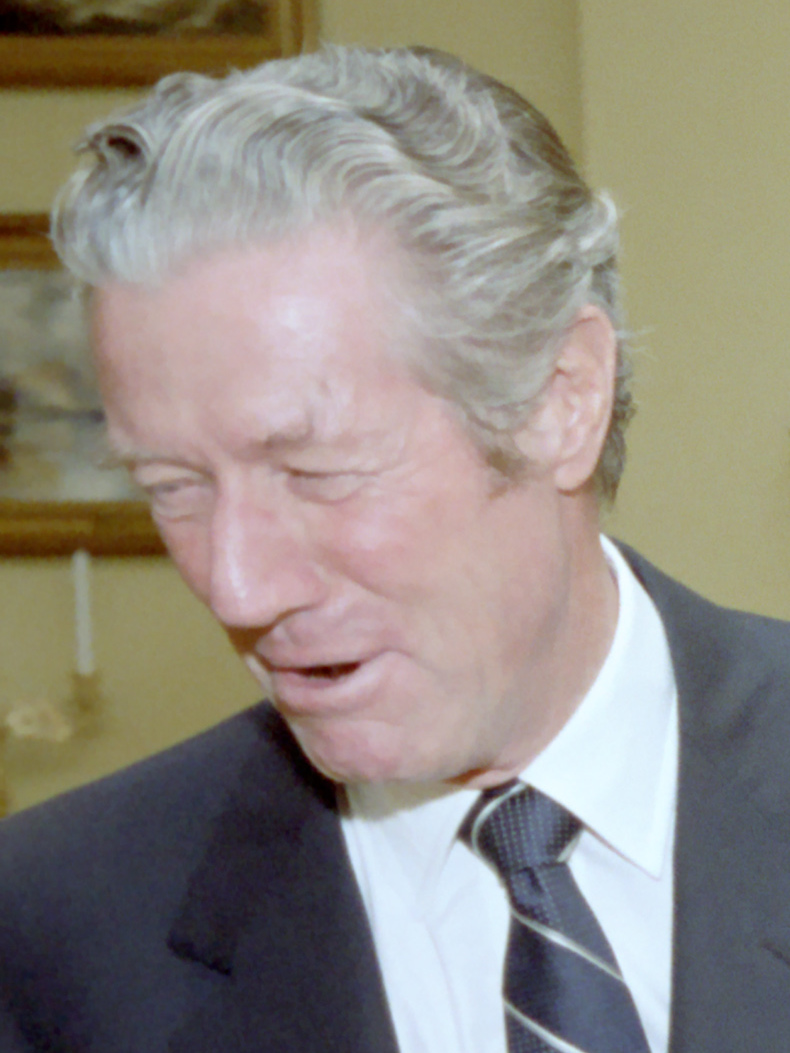
- Wilson in 1982

1st United States Ambassador to the Holy See
- In office April 9, 1984 – July 18, 1986
- President: Ronald Reagan
- Preceded by: Diplomatic relations established
- Succeeded by: Frank J. Shakespeare

Personal Representative of the President to the Holy See
- In office February 11, 1981 – April 9, 1984
- President: Ronald Reagan
- Preceded by: Robert F. Wagner Jr.
- Succeeded by: Office abolished

Personal details
- Born: William Albert Wilson; November 3, 1914 Los Angeles, California, U.S.
- Died: December 5, 2009 (aged 95) Carmel, California, U.S.
- Party: Republican
- Spouse: Elizabeth Johnson
- Children: 2
- Education: Stanford University (BS, MS)

Military service
- Allegiance: United States
- Branch/service: Ordnance Corps
- Rank: Captain

William Albert Wilson (November 3, 1914 – December 5, 2009) was an American diplomat and businessman from Los Angeles. From 1984 to 1986, he served as the first U.S. Ambassador to the Holy See.

== Early life and education ==
Wilson's father was an engineer in the oil-tool business and his mother a Canadian. Wilson attended college at Stanford University, where he earned a Bachelor of Science degree in mechanical engineering in 1936 and a Master of Science degree in mechanical engineering in 1937. While attending Stanford, he met his wife, Elizabeth "Betty" Johnson, the daughter of Pennzoil co-founder Luther Johnson. They married in 1938 and he converted to her religion, Catholicism. Together, they went on to have two daughters. She later died in 1996.

During World War II, Wilson served as a captain in the Army Ordnance Corps. He later was employed by his family's business, Web Wilson Oil Tools, and went on to become its president, until the company's sale in 1960. After that, Wilson had a successful career as a real estate developer, cattle rancher, and investor.

== Political career ==
A close friend of President Ronald Reagan, Wilson was appointed on 11 February 1981 as the personal representative of the President to the Holy See, when the United States still did not have full diplomatic relations with the Vatican. At the time, a 1867 U.S. Anti-Catholic law which had prevented the U.S. from establishing relations with the Vatican, was still in effect. In 1984, the law was repealed. Following this, Reagan nominated Wilson as the first United States Ambassador to the Holy See on January 10.

As Ambassador, he became involved with a scandal after being reprimanded, following his contact with Marc Rich, a commodities trader who had fled to Switzerland to avoid prosecution for racketeering, fraud, and tax evasion. He also had relations with Archbishop Paul Marcinkus, head of the Vatican Bank during the midst of a financial scandal.

In January 1986, Wilson flew to Libya for an unauthorized secret meeting with Moammar Kadafi, just several days after terror attacks in Vienna and Rome had reportedly killed 20 people. U.S. officials believed Libya was responsible for the attacks and had urged the international community to isolate Kadafi. U.S. Secretary of State George Shultz called Wilson's actions an “embarrassment.” Following this, Wilson submitted his resignation, with the state department stating that he resigned to return to private life. They refused to say whether his resignation was tied to the Kadafi meeting.

== Death ==
Wilson died of cancer in his home on 5 December 2009, aged 95. According to his daughter, Marcia Wilson Hobbs, he passed at approximately 1 am. He was survived by his two daughters, six grandchildren, and eleven great-grandchildren.

Nancy Reagan issued a statement in response, saying "I am deeply saddened at the death of Bill Wilson. He was a dear friend for many years and a close advisor to my husband."

Diplomatic posts
Preceded by (none)	U. S. Ambassador to the Holy See; 1984–1986	Succeeded by Frank J. Shakespeare
