= Early life and military career of John McCain =

Events in the life of McCain from 1936 to 1981

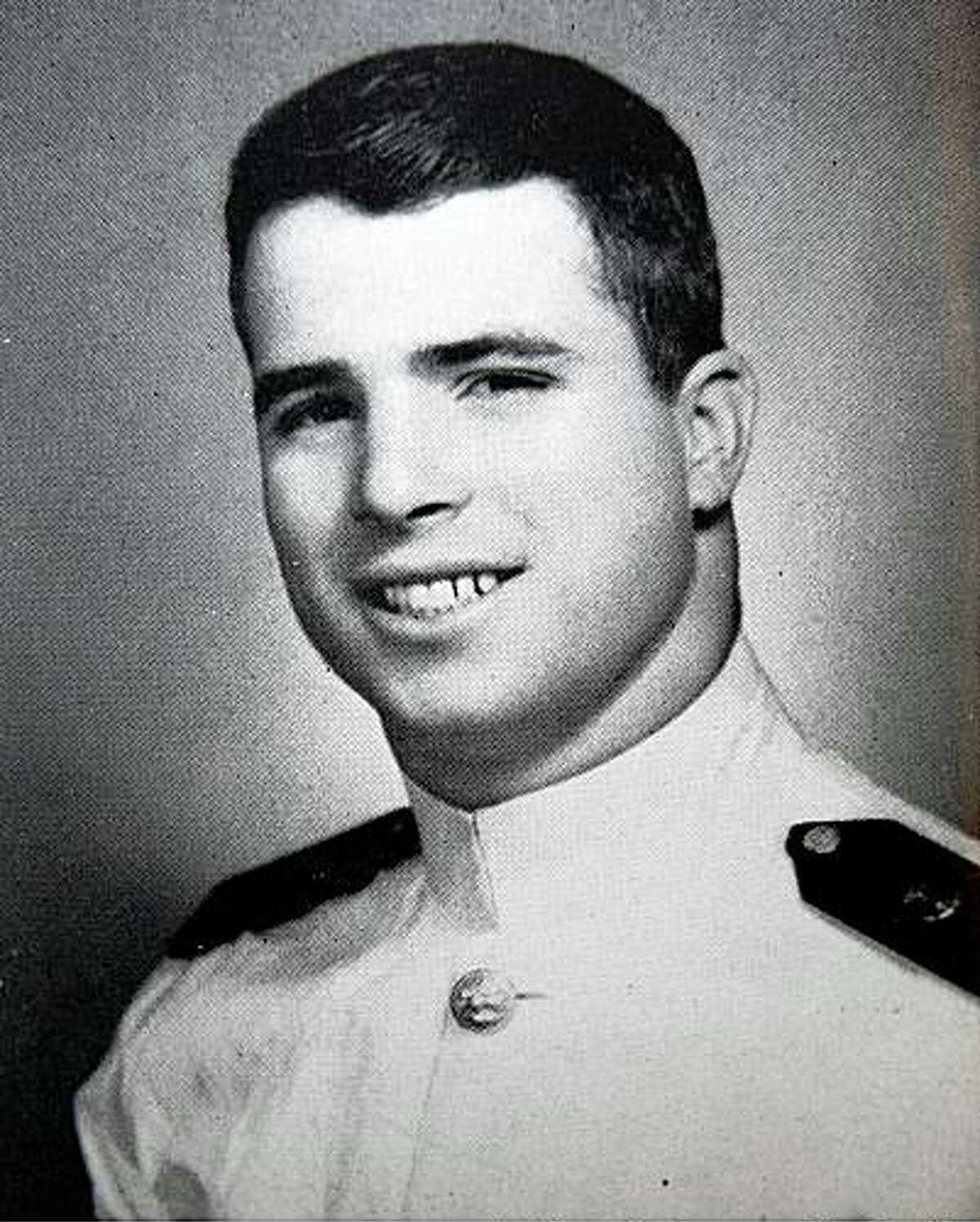
John McCain at the U.S. Naval Academy, mid-1950s

The early life and military career of John Sidney McCain III spans the first forty-five years of his life (1936–1981). McCain's father and grandfather were admirals in the United States Navy. McCain was born on August 29, 1936, in the Panama Canal Zone, and attended many schools growing up as his family moved among naval facilities. McCain graduated from the United States Naval Academy in 1958. He married the former Carol Shepp in 1965; he adopted two children from her previous marriage and they had another child together.

As a naval aviator, McCain flew attack aircraft from carriers. During the Vietnam War, he narrowly escaped death in the 1967 Forrestal fire. On his twenty-third bombing mission during Operation Rolling Thunder in October 1967, he was shot down over Hanoi and badly injured. He subsequently endured five and a half years as a prisoner of war, including periods of torture. In 1968, he refused a North Vietnamese offer of early release, because it would have meant leaving before other prisoners who had been held longer. He was released in 1973 after the Paris Peace Accords.

Upon his return, McCain studied at the National War College, commanded a large training squadron in Florida, and was appointed the Navy liaison to the U.S. Senate. He divorced his wife Carol in 1980 and married the former Cindy Hensley shortly thereafter. He retired from the Navy in 1981 as a captain.

== Early years and education ==
=== Family heritage ===
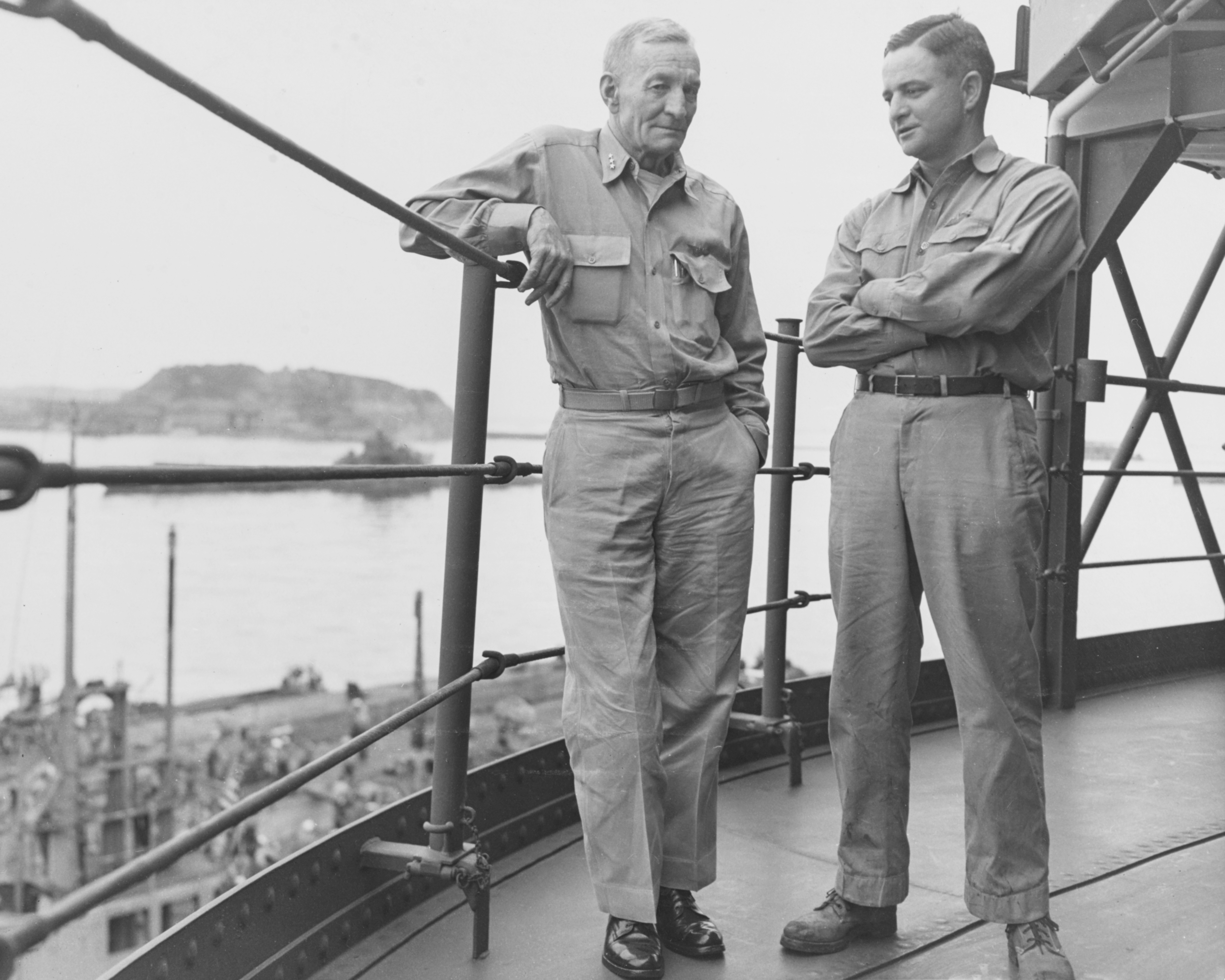
McCain's grandfather "Slew" (left) and father "Jack" on board a U.S. Navy ship in Tokyo Bay, c. September 2, 1945

John Sidney McCain III was born on August 29, 1936, at a United States Navy hospital at Coco Solo Naval Air Station in the Panama Canal Zone, which at that time was considered to be among the unincorporated territories of the United States. His parents were Navy officer John S. "Jack" McCain, Jr. (1911–1981) and Roberta (Wright) McCain (1912–2020). McCain was of Scots-Irish and English ancestry.

John McCain's grandparents were natives of Arkansas, Mississippi, and Texas, and much of his ancestry was Southern on both his mother's side and father's side. The McCain family's patrilineal ancestral home is in Mississippi's Carroll County; they owned and ran a 2,000-acre (8.1 km^{2}) plantation in Teoc from 1848 until 1952. The plantation had slaves before the American Civil War – some of whose descendants share the surname and call themselves the "black McCains" – and sharecroppers afterward; influential blues guitarist Mississippi John Hurt was born on the plantation to one of the latter.

The McCain family tree has a long heritage of American military service, with ancestors fighting as soldiers in the Indian Wars, American Revolutionary War (due to which McCain maintained a membership with the Sons of the American Revolution), War of 1812, for the Confederate States of America in the American Civil War, and in World War I. The tree also includes roguish behavior and economic success. John McCain's maternal grandfather, Archibald Wright (1875–1971), was a Mississippi native who migrated to Muskogee, Oklahoma, in his twenties, ran afoul of the law with several gambling and bootlegging charges, then became a strong-willed wildcatter who prospered on land deals during the early statehood years and struck oil in the Southwest. Rich by age forty, he never worked again and became a stay-at-home father. Raising a family in Oklahoma and Southern California, he instilled in Roberta and her twin sister Rowena a lifelong habit of travel and adventure. There is also independent-minded behavior in the family tree: Jack McCain and Roberta Wright eloped and married in a bar in Tijuana, Mexico, when Archibald Wright's wife Myrtle objected to Roberta's association with a sailor.

McCain's father and paternal grandfather eventually became Navy admirals, and were the first father–son pair to achieve four-star admiral rank. His grandfather, Admiral John S. "Slew" McCain, Sr. (1884–1945), was a pioneer of aircraft carrier operations who in 1942 commanded all land-based air operations in support of the Guadalcanal Campaign, and who ultimately in 1944–1945 aggressively led the Fast Carrier Task Force in the Pacific Ocean theater of World War II. His operations off the Philippines and Okinawa, and air strikes against Formosa and the Japanese home islands, caused tremendous destruction of Japanese naval and air forces in the closing period of the war. His death four days after the Japanese surrender ceremony in Tokyo Bay was front-page news. Jack McCain was a submarine commander in several theaters of operation in World War II and was decorated with both the Silver Star Medal and Bronze Star Medal.

=== Early life ===
From left: McCain in 1951 with his mother Roberta, his brother Joe, and his father John S. McCain Jr.

For his first ten years, "Johnny" McCain (the nickname he was given as part of a family tradition of distinguishing the generations) was frequently uprooted as his family, including older sister Sandy (1934–2019) and younger brother Joe (born 1942), followed his father to New London, Connecticut, Pearl Harbor, Hawaii, and other stations in the Pacific Ocean. Summer vacations were sometimes spent at the family's Teoc plantation, but McCain always felt his heritage was military, not Southern. McCain attended whatever naval base school was available, often to the detriment of his education, as schools were sometimes substandard and their curricula often erratic. After the 1941 attack on Pearl Harbor, his father was absent for long stretches. His formal education was supplemented by the efforts of his mother, who took advantage of the family's many long-distance travels to expose him to historical and cultural sites. He later wrote, "She taught me to find so much pleasure in life that misfortune could not rob me of the joy of living." A Republican, she also made sure that he followed current events, although his parents avoided outward partisan affiliations due to his father's military career.

After World War II ended, his father stayed in the Navy, sometimes working political liaison posts. The family settled in Northern Virginia, and McCain attended the educationally stronger St. Stephen's School in Alexandria from 1946 to 1949. To his family, McCain had long been quiet, dependable, and courteous, while at St. Stephen's he began to develop an unruly, defiant streak. Another two years were then spent following his father to naval stations; altogether he attended about twenty schools during his youth. He was frequently disciplined in school for fighting. He later wrote, "The repeated farewells to friends rank among the saddest regrets of a childhood constantly disrupted by the demands of my father's career... At each new school I arrived eager to make, by means of my insolent attitude, new friends to compensate for the loss of others. At each new school I grew more determined to assert my crude individualism. At each new school I became a more unrepentant pain in the neck."

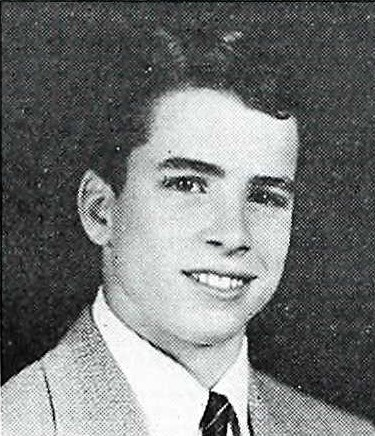
John Sidney McCain III at Episcopal High School, 1953

In 1951, McCain enrolled at Episcopal High School in Alexandria, an academically superior, all-male private boarding school with a rigorous honor code, tradition of hazing, and spartan living environment. Most of the children there were sons of wealthy Southerners, from whom McCain got a glimpse of life and career aspirations outside the Navy culture. Nicknamed "Punk" and "McNasty" due to his combative, fiery disposition, McCain enjoyed and cultivated a tough guy image; he also made a few friends. McCain earned two varsity letters in wrestling, excelling in the lighter weight classes. He also played on the junior varsity football team and the tennis team, and participated in the student newspaper, yearbook, and drama club. English teacher William Bee Ravenel III, who was also his football coach, became a great influence towards his sense of learning, honor, and self-image. With what he later termed an "undistinguished, but acceptable" academic record, McCain graduated from high school in 1954.

=== Naval Academy ===
Having done well on its entrance exams, McCain entered the United States Naval Academy in Annapolis, Maryland, in June 1954, following in the footsteps of his father and grandfather. He had neither been ordered to go there by his parents nor discussed alternatives; as he later wrote, "I remember simply recognizing my eventual enrollment at the Academy as an immutable fact of life, and accepting it without comment."

Ambivalent about his presence there, McCain chose not to conform to the Academy's rules and some of its traditions. Each year he was given over a hundred demerits – earning him membership in the "Century Club" – for offenses such as shoes not being shined, formation faults, room in disorder, and talking out of place. His father came to the Academy to reprimand him on his behavior a number of times. He hated "plebe year", the trial by ordeal and hazing of entering midshipmen that would eventually weed out one quarter of the class. He did not take well to those of higher rank arbitrarily wielding power over him – "It was bullshit, and I resented the hell out of it" – and occasionally intervened when he saw it being done to others. At 5-foot 7 inches and 127 pounds (1.70 m and 58 kg), he competed as a lightweight boxer for three years, where he lacked skills but was fearless and "didn't have a reverse gear". In his final year, he managed the battalion boxing team to a brigade championship.

Possessed of a strong intelligence, McCain did well in a few subjects that interested him, such as English literature, history, and government. There was a fixed Bachelor of Science curriculum taken by all midshipmen; McCain's classmates were impressed by his cramming abilities on mathematics, science, and engineering courses and thought his low grades were by inclination and not ability, while McCain would later acknowledge that those courses were a struggle for him. His class rank was further lowered by poor grades for conduct and leadership, which reflected his sloppy appearance, rebellious attitude, and poor relations with his company officer. Despite his low standing, McCain was popular and a leader among his fellow midshipmen, in what writer Robert Timberg, in his acclaimed 1995 work The Nightingale's Song, called a "manic, intuitive, highly idiosyncratic way". Good at attracting women, McCain was famed for organizing off-Yard activities with a group who called themselves "the Bad Bunch"; one classmate said that "being on liberty with John McCain was like being in a train wreck." Other midshipmen were annoyed by his behavior. A June 1957 training cruise aboard the destroyer USS Hunt found McCain showing good skills at the conn, and the destination stop in Rio de Janeiro led to a dream-like romance with Brazilian fashion model and ballerina Maria Gracinda that persisted through a Christmastime reunion.

McCain graduated from the Naval Academy in June 1958; he was fifth from the bottom in class rank, 894th out of 899. Despite his difficulties, McCain later wrote that he never defamed the more compelling traditions of the Academy – courage, resilience, honor, and sacrifice for one's country – and he never wavered in his desire to show his father and family that he was of the same mettle as his naval forebears. Indeed, Slew and Jack McCain had not had sterling records at the Academy themselves, finishing in the bottom third and bottom twentieth respectively. McCain realized later that the Academy had taught him that "to sustain my self-respect for a lifetime it would be necessary for me to have the honor of serving something greater than my self-interest", a lesson that he would need to carry him through a "desperate and uncertain" time a decade later.

== Military career ==
=== Naval training, early assignments, first marriage, and children ===
John Sidney McCain III
- Born: August 29, 1936
- Died: August 25, 2018 (aged 81)
- Military career
- Allegiance: United States of America
- Branch: United States Navy
- Service years: 1958–1981
- Rank: Captain
- Units: USS Intrepid (CV-11) VA-65; USS Enterprise (CVN-65) VA-65; USS Forrestal (CV-59) VA-46; USS Oriskany (CV-34) VA-163; Office of Legislative Affairs
- Commands: VA-174
- Conflicts: Vietnam War (POW): Operation Rolling Thunder
- Awards: Silver Star Medal; Legion of Merit (2) w/ Combat "V"; Distinguished Flying Cross; Bronze Star Medal (3) w/ Combat "V"; Purple Heart Medal (2) others
- Other work: United States Senator from Arizona; U.S. presidential candidate

McCain was commissioned an ensign on June 4, 1958. He spent two years as a naval aviator in training, first at Naval Air Station Pensacola in Florida through September 1959, and then at Naval Air Station Corpus Christi in Texas, during which time he was promoted to lieutenant, junior grade. He earned a reputation as a party man, as he drove a Corvette, dated an exotic dancer named "Marie the Flame of Florida", spent all his free time on the beach or in a Bachelor Officer Quarters room turned bar and friendly gambling den, and, as he later said, "generally misused my good health and youth". He began as a sub-par flier: he had limited patience for studying aviation manuals, and spent study time reading history books instead. He was not assigned to the elite units flying fighter aircraft, and instead became a pilot of attack aircraft. During a March 1960 practice run in Texas, he lost track of his altitude and speed, and his single-seat, single-engine, piston-driven AD-6 Skyraider crashed into Corpus Christi Bay and sank to the bottom. Although momentarily knocked unconscious by the impact, he squeezed out of the cockpit and swam ten feet to the surface, escaping without major injuries. He graduated from flight school at Corpus Christi in May 1960. He joined squadron VA-42 at Naval Air Station Oceana in Virginia for five months of further training on the Skyraider.

Starting in November 1960, McCain flew Skyraiders with the VA-65 "World Famous Fighting Tigers" squadron on the aircraft carriers USS Intrepid and USS Enterprise. The carriers were based at Naval Station Norfolk and cruised in the Caribbean and in several deployments to the Mediterranean. His aviation skills improved, but around December 1961 he collided with power lines while flying recklessly low over southern Spain. The area suffered a power outage, but McCain was able to return his damaged Skyraider to Intrepid.

On board for Enterprise's maiden voyage in January 1962, McCain gained visibility with the captain and shipboard publicity that fellow sailors and aviators attributed to his famous last name. McCain was made a lieutenant in June 1962, and was on alert duty on Enterprise when it helped enforce the naval quarantine of Cuba during the October 1962 Cuban Missile Crisis. In November 1963, he was rotated back to shore duty, serving nine months on the staff of the Naval Air Basic Training Command at Pensacola. In September 1964, he became a flight instructor with the VT-7 training squadron at Naval Air Station Meridian in Mississippi, where McCain Field had been named for his grandfather.

During the 1964 stint at Pensacola, McCain began a relationship with Carol Shepp, a successful swimwear and runway model originally from Philadelphia, Pennsylvania. They had known each other at the Naval Academy and she had married and then divorced one of his classmates. McCain told her he wanted to do something important with his life, so he would be recorded in history. On July 3, 1965, McCain married Shepp in Philadelphia. She already had two children, Douglas and Andrew, born in 1959 and 1962 respectively; he adopted them in 1966. Carol and he then had a daughter named Sidney in September 1966.

In the summer of 1965, McCain appeared as a contestant on the television quiz show Jeopardy! (during the Art Fleming era). McCain won the first day, but lost on the second day. He later recalled Final Jeopardy making the difference, where the clue was "Cathy loves him, but she married Edgar Linton instead". McCain knew the novel in question, writing down "What is Wuthering Heights?", but the clue was looking for the specific character, "Who is Heathcliff?"

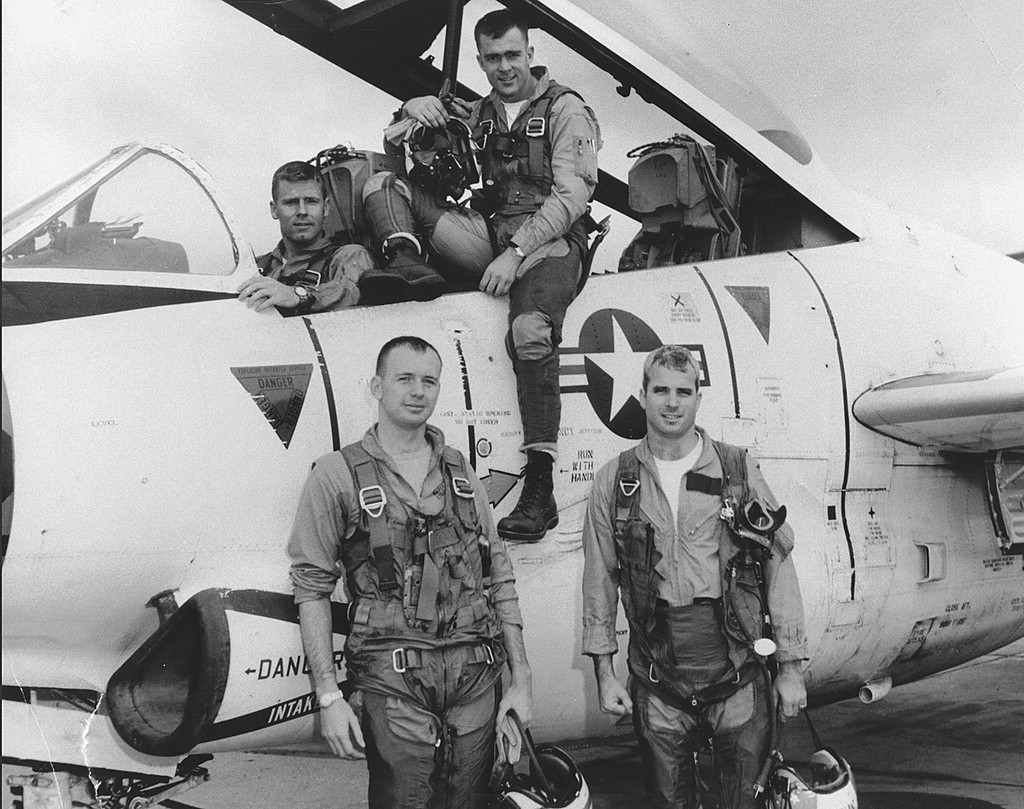
McCain (front right) with his squadron and T-2 Buckeye trainer, in 1965

In November 1965, he had his third accident when apparent engine failure in his T-2 Buckeye trainer jet over the Eastern Shore of Virginia led to his ejecting safely before his plane crashed. While at Meridian, McCain requested a combat assignment. In October 1966, he was slated for upcoming Vietnam War duty, and so reported to the VA-44 Replacement Air Group squadron at Naval Air Station Cecil Field in Florida for training on the A-4 Skyhawk, a single-seat jet attack aircraft. There McCain was seen as a good pilot, albeit one who tended to "push the envelope" in his flying. Promoted to lieutenant commander in January 1967, McCain joined the aircraft carrier USS Forrestal by May 1967, flying Skyhawks with the VA-46 "Clansmen" squadron. Forrestal conducted training exercises in the Atlantic early in the year, then set sail for the Pacific in June. By this time, Jack McCain had risen in the ranks, making rear admiral in 1958 and vice admiral in 1963; in May 1967, he was promoted to four-star admiral, and became Commander-in-Chief, U.S. Naval Forces, Europe, stationed in London.

=== Vietnam operations ===
On July 25, 1967, Forrestal reached Yankee Station in the Gulf of Tonkin and joined Operation Rolling Thunder, the 1965–68 air interdiction and strategic bombing campaign against North Vietnam. By the end of 1966, Rolling Thunder was not meeting its most important goals. Accordingly, for 1967 an emphasized focus was placed on strategic industrial and resupply targets such as power plants, port facilities, and the like, including some targets that had previously been deemed too politically sensitive to attack. In particular, the alpha strikes flown from Forrestal were against specific, pre-selected targets such as arms depots, factories, and bridges. The flights were quite dangerous, due to the strength of the North Vietnamese air defenses, which used Soviet-designed and -supplied surface-to-air missiles, anti-aircraft artillery, and MiG jet interceptors. McCain's first five attack missions over North Vietnam went without incident, and while still unconcerned with minor Navy regulations, McCain had garnered the reputation of a serious aviator. McCain and his fellow pilots were frustrated by the micromanagement of Rolling Thunder from Washington; he later wrote, "The target list was so restricted that we had to go back and hit the same targets over and over again... Most of our pilots flying the missions believed that our targets were virtually worthless. In all candor, we thought our civilian commanders were complete idiots who didn't have the least notion of what it took to win the war."

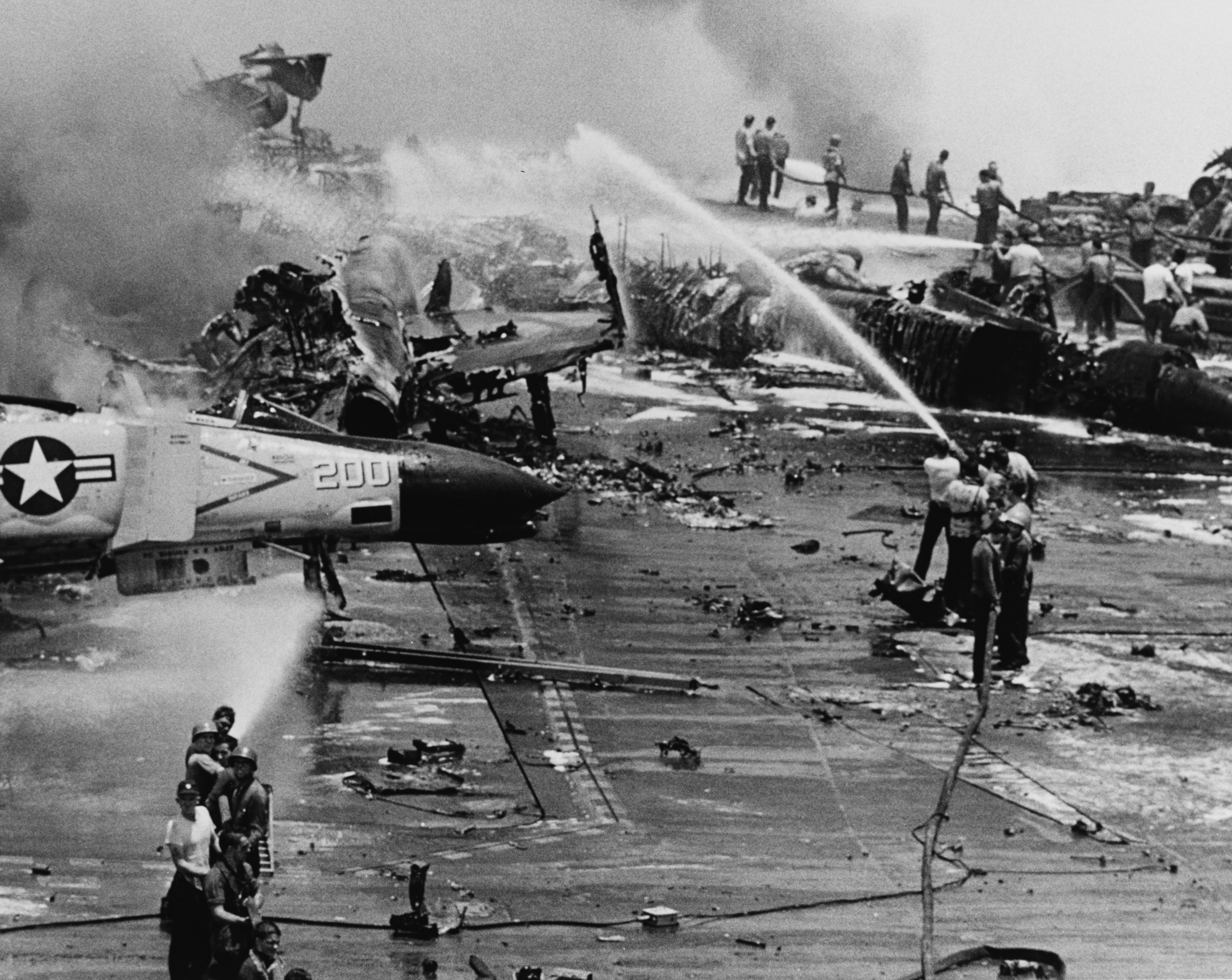
Crew members fighting the 1967 USS Forrestal fire

McCain was almost killed on board Forrestal on July 29, 1967. While the air wing was preparing to launch attacks, a Zuni rocket from an F-4 Phantom accidentally fired across the carrier's deck. The rocket struck either McCain's A-4E Skyhawk or one near it. The impact ruptured the Skyhawk's fuel tank, which ignited the fuel and knocked two bombs loose. McCain later said, "I thought my aircraft exploded. Flames were everywhere." McCain escaped from his jet by climbing out of the cockpit, working himself to the nose of the jet, and jumping off its refueling probe onto the burning deck. His flight suit caught on fire as he rolled through the flames, but he was able to put it out. He went to help another pilot trying to escape the fire when the first bomb exploded; McCain was thrown backwards ten feet (three meters) and suffered minor wounds when struck in the legs and chest by fragments. McCain helped crewmen throw unexploded bombs overboard off the hangar deck elevator, then went to Forrestal's ready room and with other pilots watched the ensuing fire and the fire-fighting efforts on the room's closed-circuit television. The fire killed 134 sailors, injured scores of others, destroyed at least 20 aircraft, and took 24 hours to control. In Saigon a day after the conflagration, McCain praised the heroism of enlisted men who gave their lives trying to save the pilots on deck, and told The New York Times reporter R. W. Apple Jr., "It's a difficult thing to say. But now that I've seen what the bombs and the napalm did to the people on our ship, I'm not so sure that I want to drop any more of that stuff on North Vietnam." But such a change of course was unlikely; as McCain added, "I always wanted to be in the Navy. I was born into it and I never really considered another profession. But I always had trouble with the regimentation."

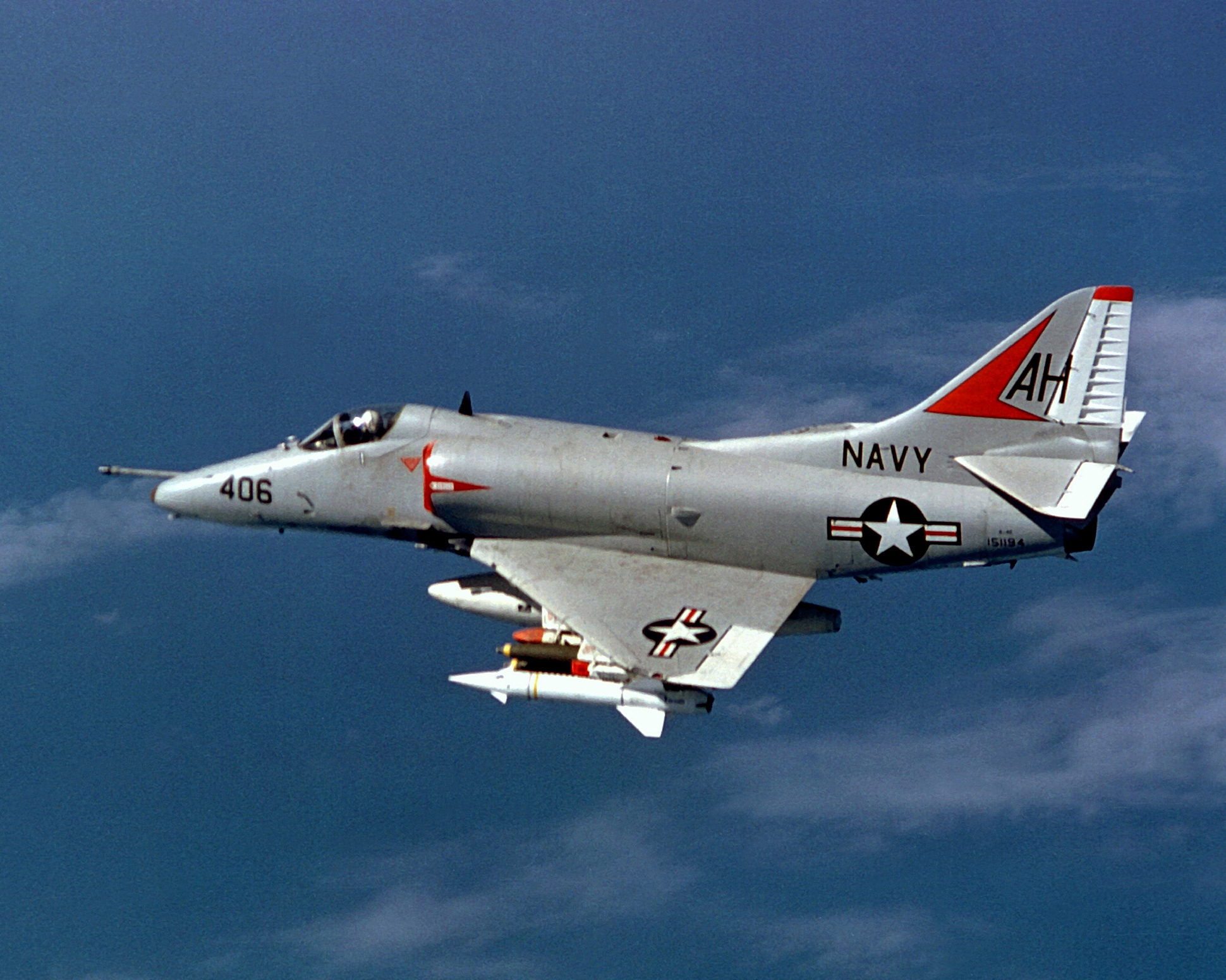
An A-4E Skyhawk, similar to the one McCain flew (from a different Oriskany squadron) in 1967

As Forrestal headed to port for repairs, McCain volunteered to join the undermanned VA-163 "Saints" squadron on board the USS Oriskany. This carrier had earlier endured its own deck fire disaster and its squadrons had suffered some of the heaviest losses during Rolling Thunder. The Saints had a reputation for aggressive, daring attacks, but paid the price: in 1967, one-third of their pilots were killed or captured, and all of their original fifteen A-4s had been destroyed. After taking some leave in Europe and back home in Orange Park, Florida, McCain joined Oriskany on September 30, 1967, for a tour he expected would finish early the next summer. He volunteered to fly the squadron's most dangerous missions right away, rather than work his way up to them. During October 1967, the pilots operated in constant twelve-hour on, twelve-hour off shifts. McCain would be awarded a Navy Commendation Medal for leading his air section through heavy enemy fire during an October 18 raid on the Lac Trai shipyard in Haiphong. On October 25, McCain successfully attacked the Phúc Yên Air Base north of Hanoi through a barrage of anti-aircraft artillery and surface-to-air missile fire; credited with destroying one aircraft on the ground and damaging two, the raid would garner him the Air Medal. Air defenses around Hanoi were at this point the strongest they would be during the entire war.

=== Prisoner of war ===
External videos
- "Vietnam Revisited with Senator John McCain", C-SPAN, September 1, 1992

==== Arrival ====
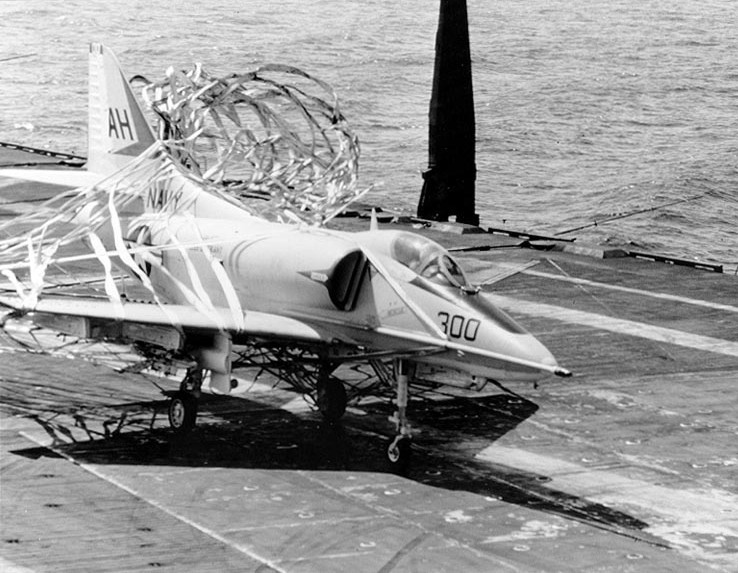
Denny Earl takes the barrier with A-4E (BuNo 152003) aboard Oriskany after having been shot through both legs, which were shattered. Despite reports, McCain never flew this aircraft.

On October 26, 1967, McCain was flying his twenty-third mission, part of a twenty-plane strike force against the Yen Phu thermal power plant in central Hanoi that previously had almost always been off-limits to U.S. raids due to the possibility of collateral damage. Arriving just before noon, McCain dove from 9,000 to 4,000 feet on his approach; as he neared the target, warning systems in McCain's A-4E Skyhawk alerted him that he was being tracked by enemy fire-control radar. Like other U.S. pilots in similar situations, he did not break off the bombing run, and he held his dive until he released his bombs at about 3,500 feet (1,000 m). As he started to pull up, the Skyhawk's wing was blown off by a Soviet-made SA-2 anti-aircraft missile fired by the North Vietnamese Air Defense Command's 61st Battalion, commanded by Captain Nguyen Lan assisted by fire control officer Lieutenant Nguyen Xuan Dai. McCain was later awarded the Distinguished Flying Cross for this day, while Nguyen Xuan Dai was awarded the title Hero of the People's Armed Forces. Decades later, Soviet Army Lieutenant Yuri Trushechkin (Russian: Юрий Трушечкин) claimed that he had been the missile guidance officer who had shot McCain down. In any case, the raid was a failure, as the power plant was not damaged and three of the attacking planes were shot down.

McCain being pulled out of Trúc Bạch Lake in Hanoi and about to become a prisoner of war, on October 26, 1967

McCain's plane went into a vertical inverted spin. McCain bailed out upside down at high speed; the force of the ejection fractured his right arm in three places, his left arm, and his right leg at the knee, and knocked him unconscious. McCain nearly drowned after parachuting into Trúc Bạch Lake in Hanoi; the weight of his equipment was pulling him down, and as he regained consciousness, he could not use his arms. Eventually, he was able to inflate his life vest using his teeth. Several Vietnamese, possibly led by Department of Industry clerk Mai Van On, pulled him ashore. A mob gathered around, spat on him, kicked him, and stripped him of his clothes; his left shoulder was crushed with the butt of a rifle and he was bayoneted in his left foot and left groin area. He was then transported to Hanoi's main Hỏa Lò Prison, nicknamed the "Hanoi Hilton" by American POWs.

McCain reached Hỏa Lò in as bad a physical condition as any prisoner during the war. His captors refused to give him medical care unless he gave them military information; they beat and interrogated him, but McCain only offered his name, rank, serial number, and date of birth (the only information he was required to provide under the Geneva Conventions and permitted to give under the U.S. Code of Conduct). Soon thinking he was near death, McCain said he would give them more information if taken to the hospital, hoping he could then put his interrogators off once he was treated. A prison doctor came and said it was too late, as McCain was about to die anyway. Only when the North Vietnamese discovered that his father was a high-ranking admiral did they give him medical care, calling him "the crown prince". Two days after McCain's plane went down, that event and his status as a POW made the front pages of The New York Times and The Washington Post. Interrogation and beatings resumed in the hospital; McCain gave the North Vietnamese his ship's name, squadron's name, and the attack's intended target. This information, along with personal details of McCain's life and purported statements by McCain about the war's progress, would appear over the next two weeks in the North Vietnamese official newspaper Nhân Dân as well as in dispatches from outlets such as the Cuban news agency Prensa Latina. Disclosing the military information was in violation of the Code of Conduct, which McCain later wrote he regretted, although he saw the information as being of no practical use to the North Vietnamese. Further coerced to give future targets, he named cities that had already been bombed, and responding to demands for the names of his squadron's members, he supplied instead the names of the Green Bay Packers' offensive line.

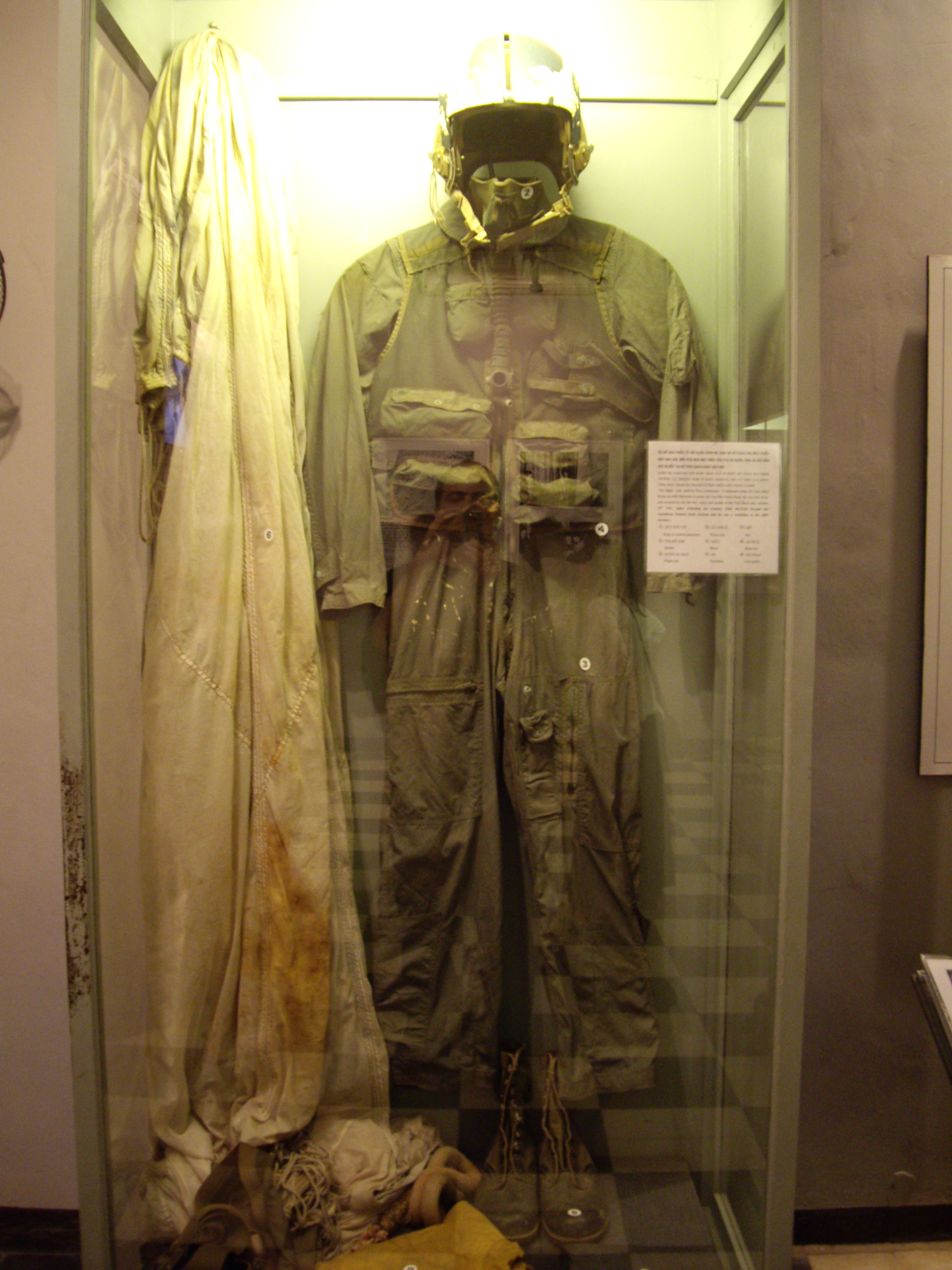
Decades later, McCain's flight suit and gear were put on display at a museum in the remaining portion of Hỏa Lò Prison.

McCain spent six weeks in the hospital, receiving marginal care in a dirty, wet environment. A prolonged attempt to set the fractures on his right arm, done without anesthetic, was unsuccessful; he received an operation on his broken leg but no treatment for his broken left arm. He was temporarily taken to a clean room and interviewed by a French journalist, François Chalais, whose report was carried on the French television program Panorama in January 1968 and later in the U.S. on the CBS Evening News. The film footage of McCain lying in the bed, in a cast, smoking cigarettes and speaking haltingly, would become one of the most widely distributed images of McCain's imprisonment. McCain was observed by a variety of North Vietnamese, including renowned Vietnamese writer Nguyễn Tuân and Defense Minister and Army commander-in-chief General Võ Nguyên Giáp. Many of the North Vietnamese observers assumed that McCain must be part of America's political-military-economic elite. Now having lost fifty pounds (twenty-three kilograms), in a chest cast, covered in grime and eyes full of fever, and with his hair turned white, in early December 1967 McCain was sent to a prisoner-of-war camp on the outskirts of Hanoi nicknamed "the Plantation". He was placed in a cell with George "Bud" Day, a badly injured and tortured Air Force pilot (later awarded the Medal of Honor) and Norris Overly, another Air Force pilot; they did not expect McCain to live another week. Overly, and subsequently Day, nursed McCain and kept him alive; Day later recalled that McCain had "a fantastic will to live".

==== Solitary ====
In March 1968, McCain was put into solitary confinement, where he remained for two years. Unknown to the POWs, in April 1968, Jack McCain was named Commander-in-Chief, Pacific Command (CINCPAC) effective in July, stationed in Honolulu and commander of all U.S. forces in the Vietnam theater. In mid-June, Major Bai, commander of the North Vietnamese prison camp system, offered McCain a chance to return home early. The North Vietnamese wanted to score a worldwide propaganda coup by appearing merciful, and also wanted to show other POWs that members of the elite like McCain were willing to be treated preferentially. McCain turned down the offer of release, due to the POWs' "first in, first out" interpretation of the U.S. Code of Conduct: he would only accept the offer if every man captured before him was released as well. McCain's refusal to be released was remarked upon by North Vietnamese senior negotiator Lê Đức Thọ to U.S. envoy Averell Harriman, during the ongoing Paris Peace Talks. Enraged by his declining of the offer, Bai and his assistant told McCain that things would get very bad for him.

In late August 1968, a program of vigorous torture methods began on McCain. The North Vietnamese used rope bindings to put him into prolonged, painful positions and severely beat him every two hours, all while he was suffering from dysentery. His right leg was reinjured, his ribs were cracked, some teeth were broken at the gumline, and his left arm was re-fractured. Lying in his own waste, his spirit was broken; the beginnings of a suicide attempt were stopped by guards. After four days of this, McCain signed and taped an anti-American propaganda "confession" that said, in part, "I am a black criminal and I have performed the deeds of an air pirate. I almost died, and the Vietnamese people saved my life, thanks to the doctors." He used stilted Communist jargon and ungrammatical language to signal that the statement was forced. McCain was haunted then and since with the belief that he had dishonored his country, his family, his comrades and himself by his statement, but as he later wrote, "I had learned what we all learned over there: Every man has his breaking point. I had reached mine." Two weeks later his captors tried to force him to sign a second statement; his will to resist restored, he refused. He sometimes received two to three beatings per week because of his continued resistance; the sustained mistreatment went on for over a year. His refusals to cooperate, laced with loud obscenities directed towards his guards, were often heard by other POWs. His boxing experience from his Naval Academy days helped him withstand the battering, and the North Vietnamese did not break him again.

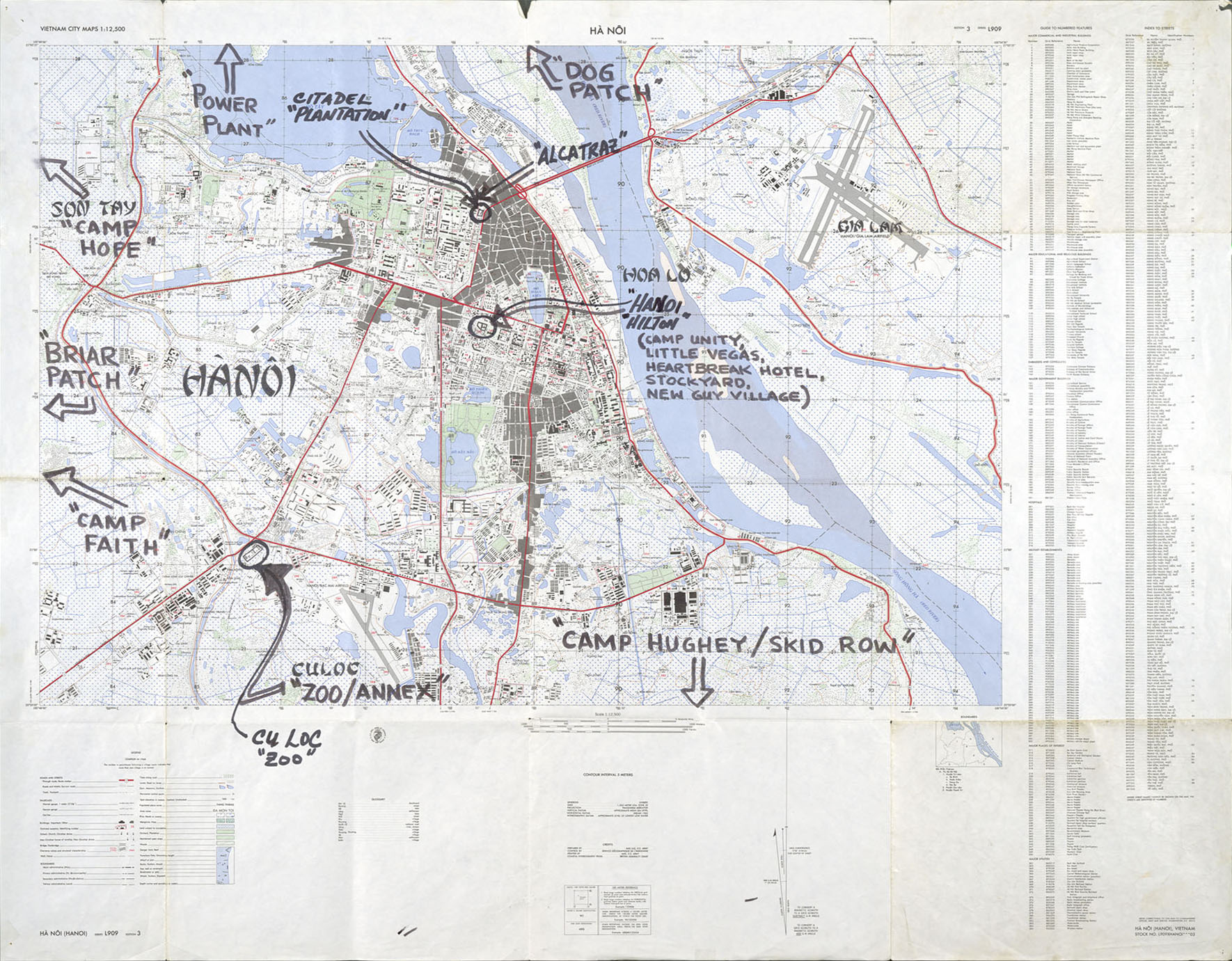
A map drawn by an American POW after the war shows the location of "the Plantation" and the "Hanoi Hilton", two of the camps where McCain spent his captivity.

Other American POWs were similarly tortured and maltreated in order to extract "confessions" and propaganda statements. Many, especially among those who had been captured earlier and imprisoned longer – such as those in the "Alcatraz Gang" – endured even worse treatment than McCain. Under extreme duress, virtually all the POWs eventually yielded something to their captors. There were momentary exceptions: on one occasion, a guard surreptitiously loosened McCain's painful rope bindings for a night; when, months later, the guard later saw McCain on Christmas Day, he stood next to McCain and silently drew a cross in the dirt with his foot. In October 1968, McCain's isolation was partly relieved when Ernest C. Brace was placed in the cell next to him; he taught Brace the tap code the prisoners used to communicate. On Christmas Eve 1968, a church service for the POWs was staged for photographers and film cameras; McCain defied North Vietnamese instructions to be quiet, speaking out details of his treatment then shouting "Fu-u-u-u-ck you, you son of a bitch!" and giving the finger whenever a camera was pointed at him. McCain refused to meet with various anti-Vietnam War peace groups coming to Hanoi, such as those led by David Dellinger, Tom Hayden, and Rennie Davis, not wanting to give either them or the North Vietnamese a propaganda victory based on his connection to his father. McCain was still badly hobbled by his injuries, earning the nickname "Crip" among the other POWs, but despite his physical condition, continued beatings and isolation, he was one of the key players in the Plantation's resistance efforts.

In May 1969, U.S. Secretary of Defense Melvin Laird began publicly questioning North Vietnamese treatment of U.S. prisoners. On June 6, 1969, a United Press International report described a Radio Hanoi broadcast, made on June 2, that denied any such mistreatment. The transmission, one of a series of North Vietnamese propaganda broadcasts on the subject of prisoners, used excerpts from McCain's spoken, forced "confession" of a year before, including statements such as: "I have bombed the cities, towns and villages and caused injuries and even death for the people of North Vietnam. After I was captured, I was taken to a hospital in Hanoi where I received very good medical treatment. I was given an operation on my leg which enabled me to walk again and a cast on my right arm, which was badly broken in three places. The doctors are very good and they knew a great deal about medicine." (The broadcast was picked up and recorded by the Foreign Broadcast Information Service and copies of it are available from the National Archives and Records Administration, as a 2016 newspaper story confirmed.)

Starting in late 1969, treatment of McCain and the other POWs suddenly improved. North Vietnamese leader Ho Chi Minh had died the previous month, possibly causing a change in policy towards POWs. Also, a badly beaten and weakened POW who had been released that summer disclosed to the world press the conditions to which they were being subjected, and the National League of Families of American Prisoners and Missing in Southeast Asia, which included McCain's brother Joe, heightened awareness of the POWs' plight. In December 1969, McCain was transferred back to the Hỏa Lò, "Hanoi Hilton"; his solitary confinement ended in March 1970. When the prisoners talked about what they wanted to do once they got out, McCain said he wanted to become president. McCain consented to a January 1970 interview outside Hỏa Lò with Spanish-born, Cuban psychologist Fernando Barral, that was published in the official Cuban newspaper Granma. McCain talked about his life and expressed no remorse for his bombing North Vietnam, and Barral proclaimed him "an insensitive individual without human depth." The POWs issued an edict forbidding any further such interviews, and despite pressure from his captors, McCain subsequently refused to see any anti-war groups or journalists sympathetic to the North Vietnamese regime.

==== Release ====
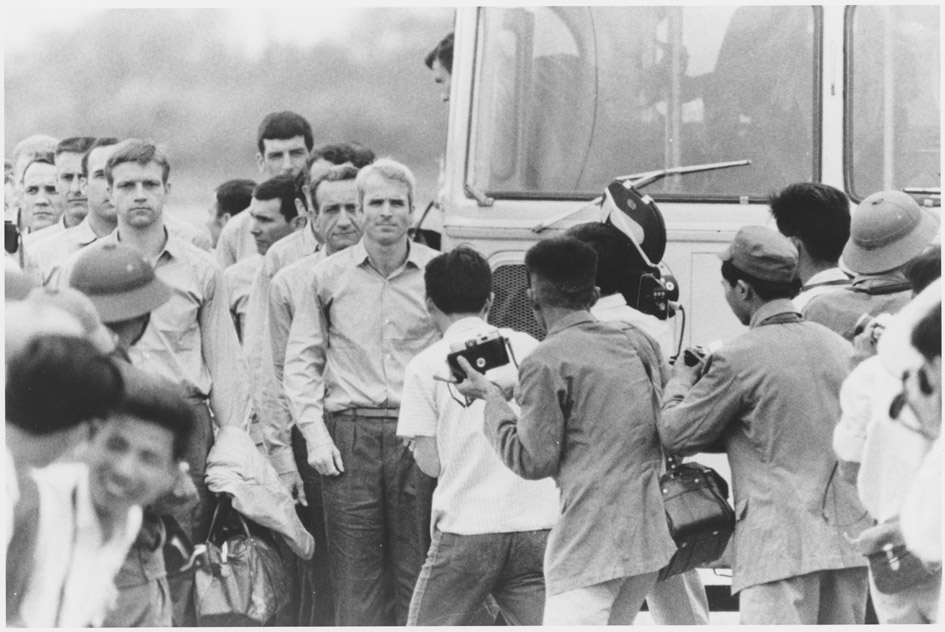
John McCain at Gia Lam Airfield in Hanoi during his release as a POW on March 14, 1973

McCain and other prisoners were moved around to different camps at times, but conditions over the next several years were generally more tolerable than they had been before. Unknown to them, during each year that Jack McCain was CINCPAC he paid a Christmastime visit to the American troops in South Vietnam serving closest to the DMZ; he would stand alone and look north, to be as close to his son as he could get. By 1971, some 30–50 percent of the POWs had become disillusioned about the war, both because of the apparent lack of military progress and what they heard of the growing anti-war movement in the U.S., and some of them were less reluctant to make propaganda statements for the North Vietnamese. McCain was not among them: he participated in a defiant church service and led an effort to write letters home that only portrayed the camp in a negative light, and as a result spent much of the year in a camp reserved for "bad attitude" cases.

Back at the "Hanoi Hilton" from November 1971 onward, McCain and the other POWs cheered the resumed bombing of the north starting in April 1972, whose targets included the Hanoi area and whose daily orders were issued by Jack McCain, knowing his son was in the vicinity. Jack McCain's tour as CINCPAC ended in September 1972, despite his desire to have it extended so he could see the war to its conclusion. The old-time POWs cheered even more during the intense "Christmas Bombing" campaign of December 1972, when Hanoi was subjected for the first time to repeated B-52 Stratofortress raids. Although its explosions lit the night sky and shook the walls of the camp, scaring some of the newer POWs, most saw it as a forceful measure to compel North Vietnam to finally come to terms.

The Paris Peace Accords were signed on January 27, 1973, ending direct U.S. involvement in the war, but the Operation Homecoming arrangements for the 591 American POWs took longer. McCain was finally released from captivity on March 14, 1973, being taken by bus to Gia Lam Airport, transferred to U.S. custody, and flown by C-141 to Clark Air Base in the Philippines. (After the last of the POWs had been released, McCain's forced "confession", along with similar statements from other POWs, was aired again during a Voice of Vietnam broadcast on April 10, 1973, as the North Vietnamese sought to refute the returning prisoners' tales of having been tortured.)

Altogether, McCain was held as a prisoner of war in North Vietnam for five and a half years, nearly five of them after his refusal to accept the out-of-sequence repatriation offer. His wartime injuries left him permanently incapable of raising either arm more than 80 degrees. For his actions as a POW, McCain was awarded the Silver Star Medal, the Legion of Merit, three Bronze Star Medals, another instance of the Navy Commendation Medal, and the Purple Heart Medal. He also gained an appreciation, from experiencing the mutual help and organized resistance of the POWs, that his earlier individualism needed to be tempered by a belief in causes greater than self-interest.

=== Return to United States ===
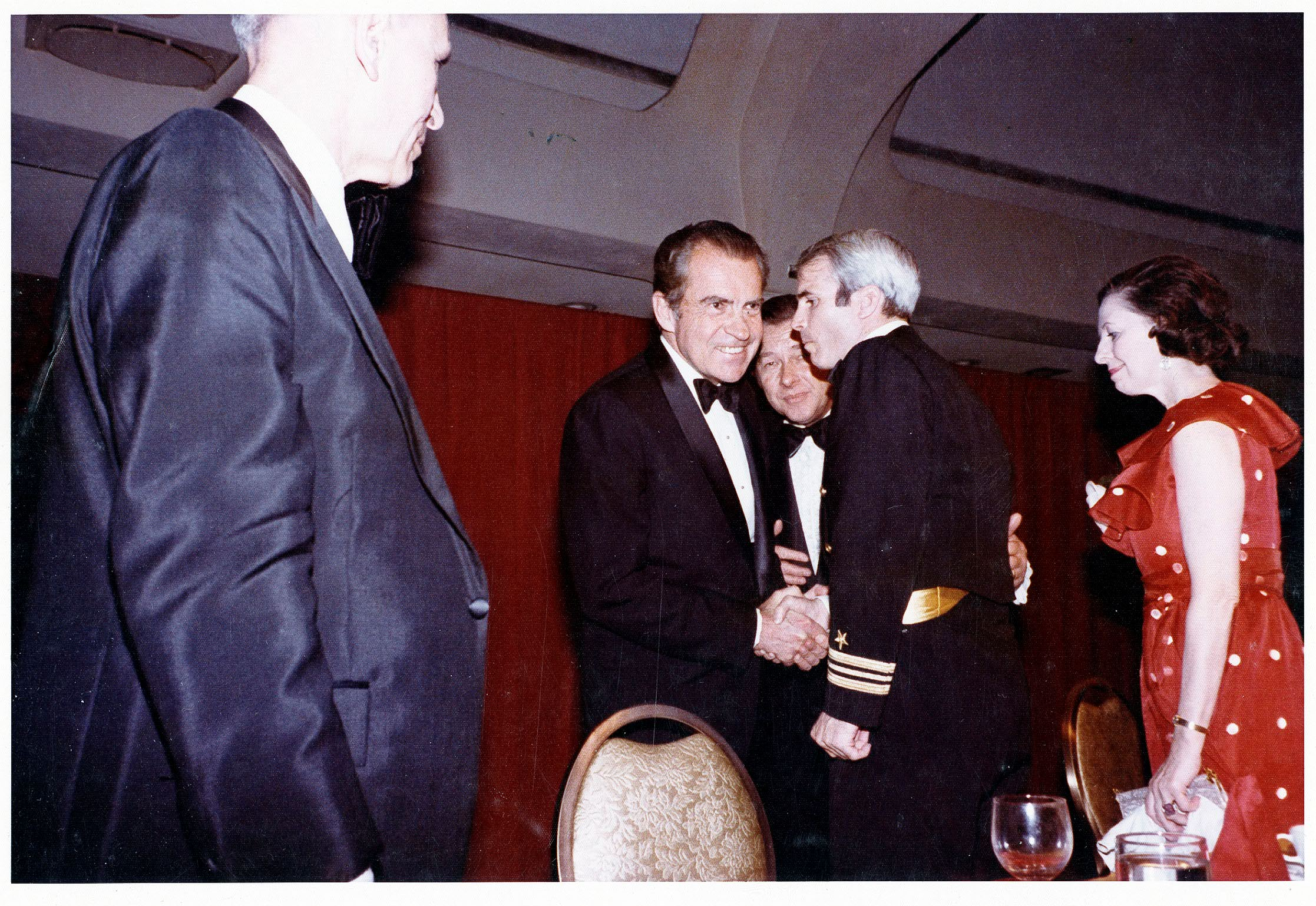
President Nixon greeting McCain at the White House Correspondents Dinner on April 14, 1973

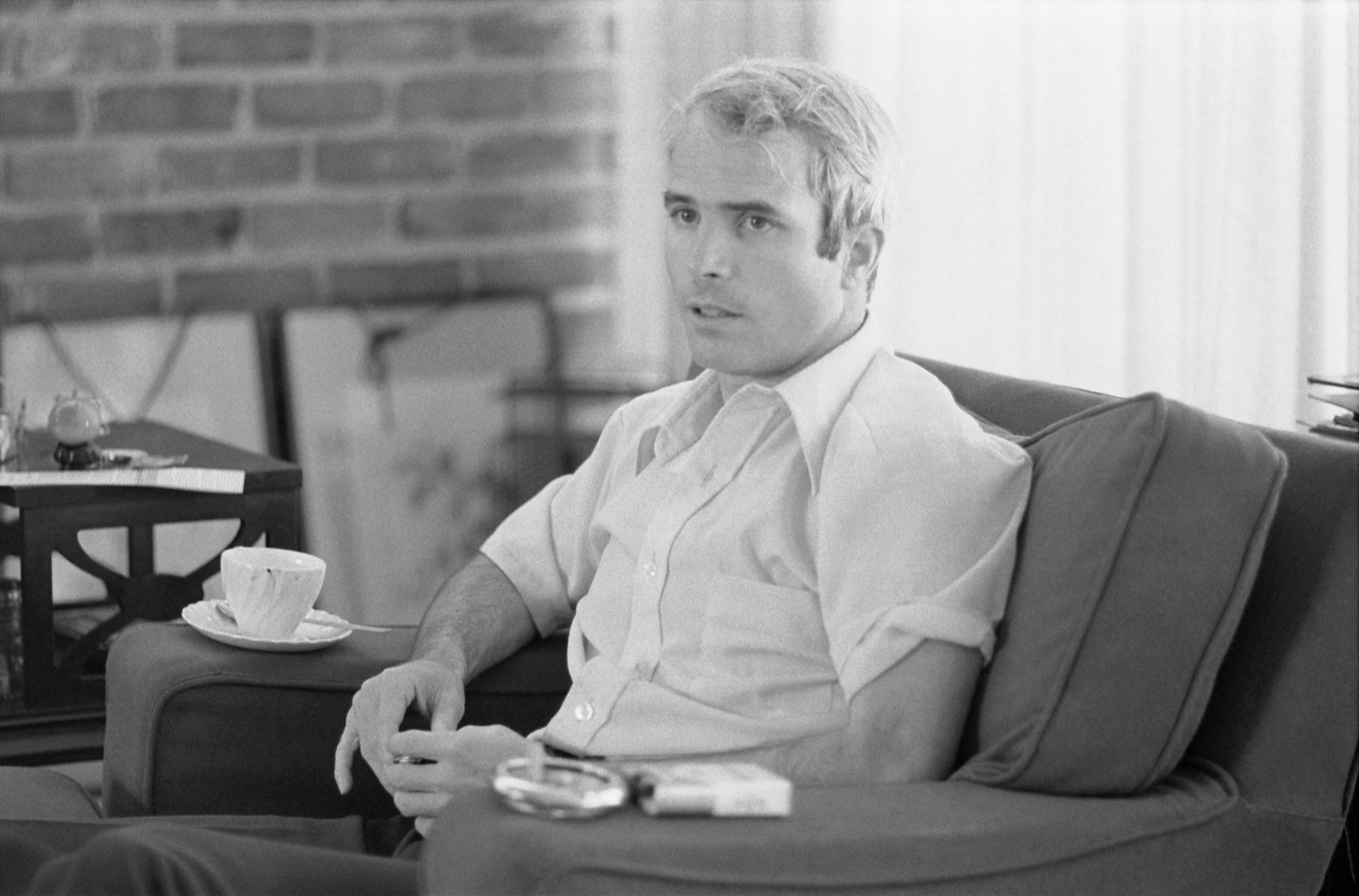
McCain giving an interview to the press on April 24, 1973, after his return from Vietnam. Photo by U.S. News & World Report.

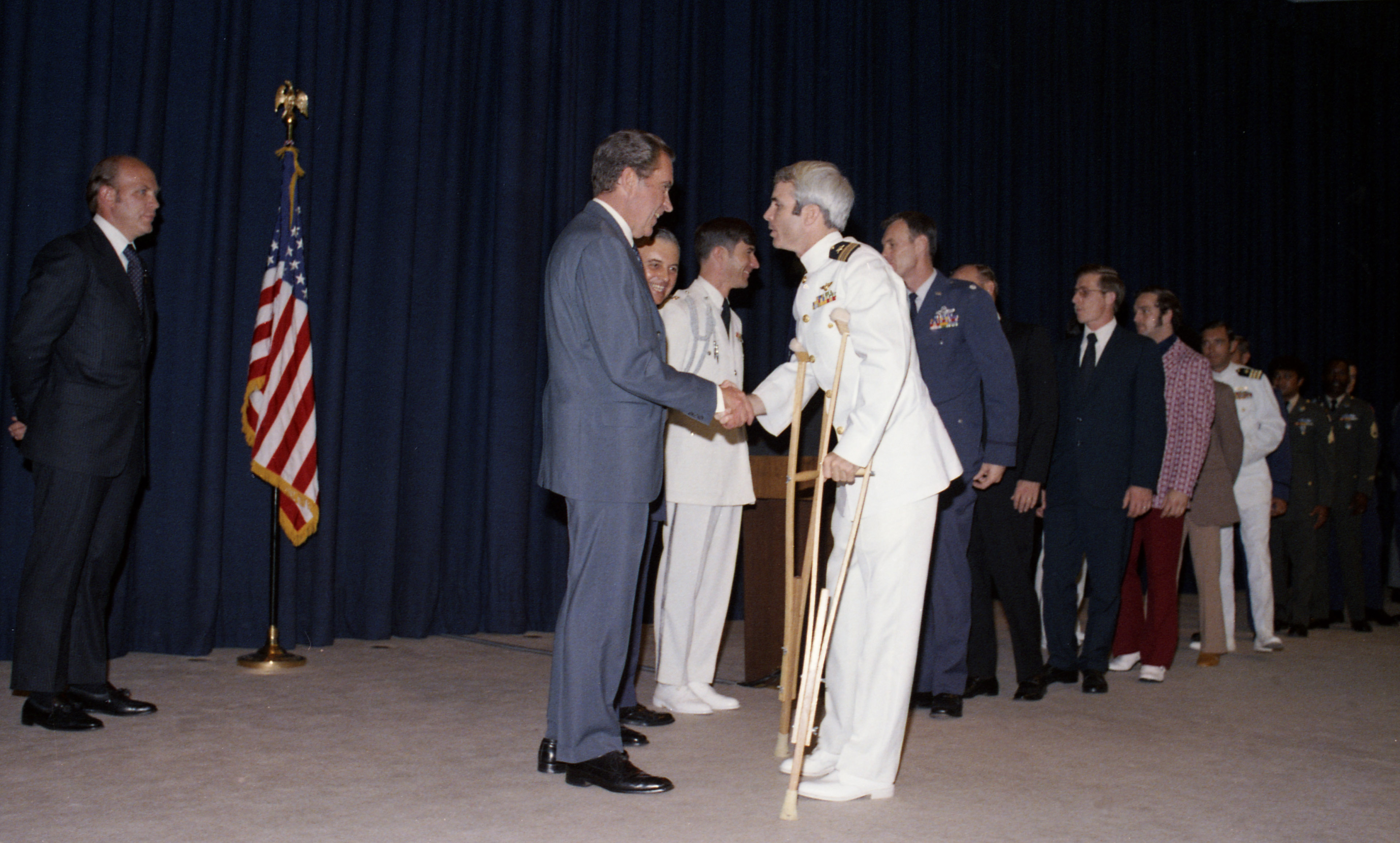
President Nixon greeting former POWs on May 24, 1973, as part of a day-long series of events honoring them. McCain is on crutches, having undergone surgery earlier that month for his leg injuries.

Upon his return to the United States a few days later, McCain was reunited with his wife Carol and his family. She had suffered her own crippling, near-death ordeal during his captivity, due to an automobile accident in December 1969 that left her hospitalized for six months and facing twenty-three operations and ongoing physical therapy. (Businessman and POW advocate Ross Perot had paid for her medical care.) By the time McCain saw her, she was four inches (ten centimeters) shorter, on crutches, and substantially heavier.

As a returned POW, McCain became a celebrity of sorts: The New York Times ran a story and front-page photo of him getting off the plane at Clark Air Base in the Philippines; he authored a thirteen-page cover story describing his ordeal and his support for the Nixon administration's handling of the war in U.S. News & World Report; he participated in parades in Orange Park and elsewhere and made personal appearances before groups, where he showed strong speaking skills; and he was given the key to the city of Jacksonville, Florida.

McCain also found high-level political visibility. On April 14, four returned POWs were in attendance and honored at the White House Correspondents' Dinner; McCain was one of them and shook hands with President Richard Nixon. Then Nixon gave an address to former POWs in an auditorium at the State Department during the day of May 24. McCain had undergone surgery earlier in the month for leg injuries suffered during his shoot-down, and a photograph of him on crutches shaking the hand of President Nixon became iconic. That evening, 600 ex-POWs and their families were honored at a gala dinner on the lawn of The White House. The McCains became frequent guests of honor at dinners hosted by Governor of California Ronald Reagan and his wife Nancy Reagan, and John McCain made a strong impression speaking at a large prayer breakfast hosted by the governor. McCain had admired Ronald Reagan while in captivity and afterwards, believing him to be a man who saw honor in Vietnam service and a potential leader who would not lead the nation into a war it was unwilling to win.

McCain underwent three operations in total and other treatment for his injuries, spending three months at the Naval Regional Medical Center in Jacksonville. Psychological tests, given to all the returning POWs, showed that McCain had "adjusted exceptionally well to repatriation" and had "an ambitious, striving, successful pattern of adjustment". McCain told examiners that he withstood his ordeal by having "Faith in country, United States Navy, family, and God". Unlike many veterans, McCain did not experience flashbacks or nightmares of his Vietnam experience, although due to the association with prison guards, the sound of keys rattling would cause him to "tense up".

McCain was promoted to commander effective July 1973 and attended the National War College in Fort McNair in Washington, D.C. during the 1973–1974 academic year. (Former POWs were given latitude in choosing their next assignment. Navy officials objected to McCain's choice of the National War College, as he was not yet a commander, the minimum rank needed to qualify; McCain had earned the rank but it had not yet become official. McCain appealed to Secretary of the Navy John Warner, a friend of his father's, and gained admission.) There he intensively studied the history of Vietnam and the French and American wars there, and wrote "The Code of Conduct and the Vietnam Prisoners of War", a long paper on the Vietnam POW experience as a test of the U.S. Code of Conduct.

By the time he graduated, McCain concluded that mistakes by American political and military leaders had doomed the war effort. (The particular operation that had led to his downing, Rolling Thunder, had been stopped in 1968, and while it had caused the North Vietnamese some logistical and resource difficulties, it had not succeeded in altering any of the fundamental equations involved in eventually determining the war's outcome.) McCain accepted the right of the anti-war movement in the U.S. to have exercised their freedom to protest, and he adopted a live-and-let-live attitude towards those who had evaded the draft. Nor did the vast changes in American social mores that had taken place during his absence bother him, as it did many other former POWs. McCain returned to Saigon in November 1974; he and a couple of other former POWs received the National Order of Vietnam, that country's highest honor. He also spoke at the South Vietnamese war college, five months before Saigon fell.

McCain resolved not to become a "professional POW" but to move forward and rebuild his life. Few thought McCain could fly again, and if he could not meet the medical requirements to remain a naval aviator he said he would consider a career in the United States Foreign Service. But he was determined to try, and during this time he engaged in nine months of grueling, painful physical therapy, especially to get his knees to bend again.

=== Commanding officer ===
McCain recuperated just enough to pass his flight physical and have his flight status reinstated. In August 1974, he was assigned to the Replacement Air Group VA-174 "Hellrazors". This was an A-7 Corsair II training squadron located at Naval Air Station Cecil Field in Jacksonville and the largest aviation squadron in the Navy. He became its executive officer in 1975, and on July 1, 1976, he was made VA-174's commanding officer. This last assignment was controversial, as he did not have the required experience of having commanded a smaller squadron first (something that he now had too high a rank to do). While some senior officers resented McCain's presence as favoritism due to his father, junior officers rallied to him and helped him qualify for A-7 carrier landings.

As commanding officer, McCain relied upon a relatively unorthodox leadership style based upon the force of his personality. He removed personnel he thought ineffective, and sought to improve morale and productivity by establishing an informal rapport with enlisted men. Dealing with limited post-Vietnam defense budgets and parts shortages, he was forceful in demanding that respect be given to the female officers just beginning to arrive into the unit. McCain's leadership abilities were credited with improving the unit's aircraft readiness; for the first time, all fifty of its aircraft were able to fly. Although some operational metrics declined during the period, the pilot safety improved to the point of having zero accidents. The squadron was awarded its first-ever Meritorious Unit Commendation, while McCain received a Meritorious Service Medal. McCain later stated that being commanding officer of VA-174 was the most rewarding assignment of his naval career. When his stint ended in July 1977, the change of command ceremony was attended by his father and the rest of his family, as well as some of his fellow POWs; speaker Admiral Isaac C. Kidd, Jr. said that John had joined Jack and Slew McCain in a place of honor in Navy tradition, a tribute that deeply moved McCain.

During their time in Jacksonville, the McCains' marriage began to falter. McCain had extramarital affairs; he was seen with other women in social settings and developed a reputation among his colleagues for womanizing. Some of McCain's activity with other women occurred when he was off-duty after routine flights to Marine Corps Air Station Yuma and Naval Air Facility El Centro. Marital difficulties were in fact quite common among the returned POWs. However, McCain later said, "My marriage's collapse was attributable to my own selfishness and immaturity more than it was to Vietnam, and I cannot escape blame by pointing a finger at the war. The blame was entirely mine." His wife Carol later stated that the failure was not due to her accident or Vietnam and that "I attribute [the breakup of our marriage] more to John turning 40 and wanting to be 25 again than I do to anything else." Writer and Vietnam veteran Robert Timberg believes that "Vietnam did play a part, perhaps not the major part, but more than a walk-on." According to John McCain, "I had changed, she had changed. People who have been apart that much change."

=== Senate liaison, divorce, and second marriage ===
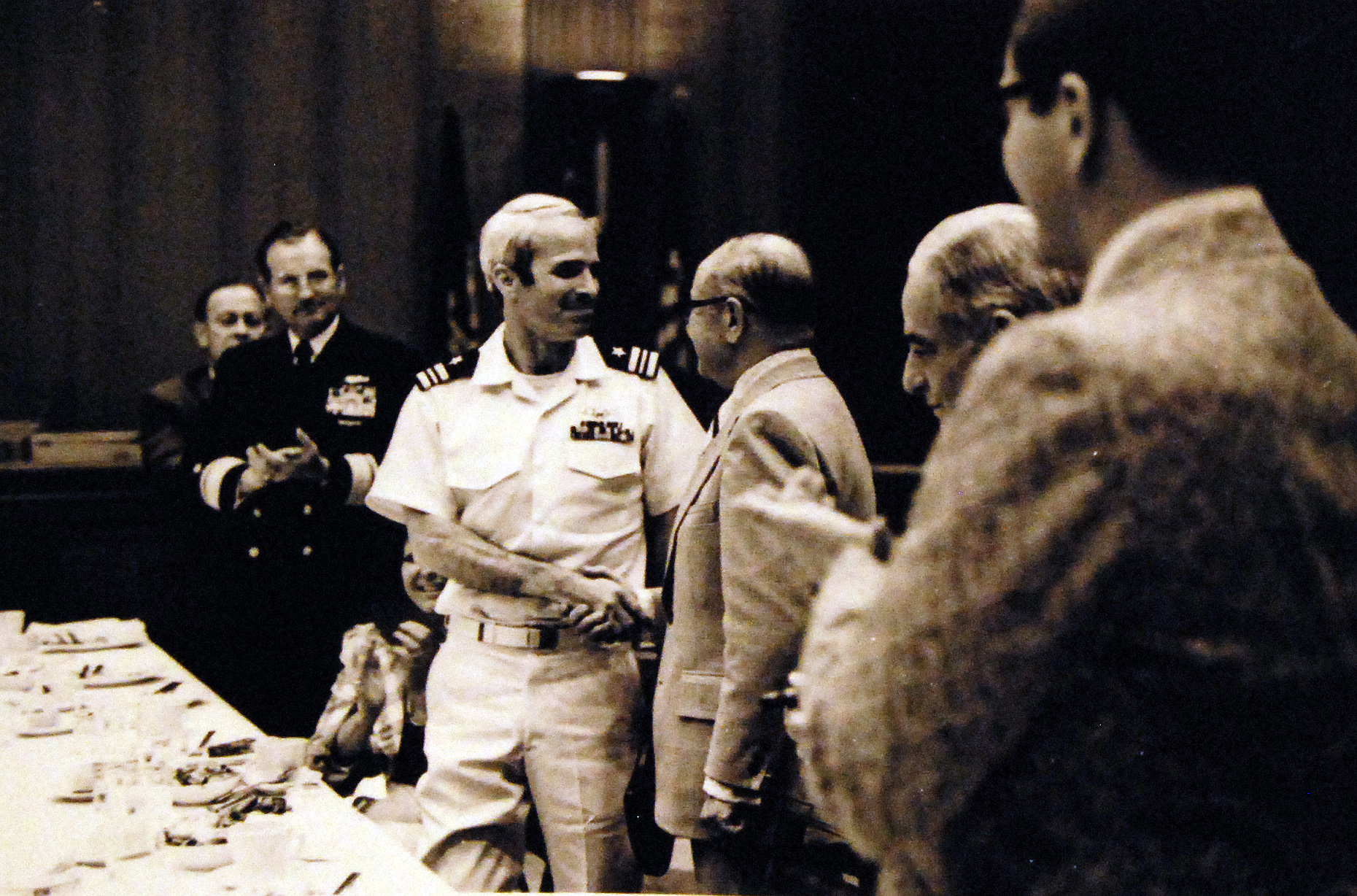
McCain, representing the former POWs, appearing at a 1973 luncheon on Capitol Hill in honor of them. He is shaking hands with Senator Carl Curtis of Nebraska. McCain's wife Carol is partially visible on his right.

McCain had thought about entering politics since his return from Vietnam, although 1964 had been the only time in his life he had ever voted. In 1976, he briefly thought of running for the U.S. House of Representatives from Florida; he had the support of some local figures in Jacksonville, but was convinced by other Republican Party leaders that he did not have sufficient political experience, funding, or popular support to defeat longtime Democratic incumbent Charles E. Bennett. Instead, he worked so hard for Ronald Reagan's 1976 Republican primary campaign that his base commander reprimanded him for being too politically active for his naval position.

As his tenure with VA-174 was ending, McCain was assigned to a low-profile desk job within the Naval Air Systems Command. Chief of Naval Operations Admiral James L. Holloway III thought this assignment a waste of McCain's social talents, and instead in July 1977 McCain was appointed to the Senate Liaison Office within the Navy's Office of Legislative Affairs (an assignment Jack McCain had once held). The office's role mostly consisted of providing constituent service and acting as a facilitator among legislators, the Department of Defense, and lobbyists. McCain later said the liaison job represented "[my] real entry into the world of politics and the beginning of my second career as a public servant". McCain's lively personality and knowledge of military matters made his post in the Russell Senate Office Building a popular gathering spot for senators and staff. He also frequently escorted congressional delegations on overseas trips, where he arranged entertaining side escapades. McCain was influenced by senators of both parties, and formed an especially strong bond with John Tower of Texas, the ranking member of the Senate Armed Services Committee. During 1978 and 1979, McCain played a key behind-the-scenes role in gaining congressional funding for a new supercarrier against the wishes of the Carter administration and Navy Secretary W. Graham Claytor Jr. In August 1979, McCain was promoted to naval captain, and became Director of the Senate Liaison Office. During McCain's time there, the Senate Liaison Office enjoyed one of its few periods of high influence.

McCain and his wife Carol had been briefly separated soon after returning to Washington, but then reunited and remained married. In April 1979, while attending a military reception for senators in Hawaii, McCain met Cindy Lou Hensley, eighteen years his junior, a teacher from Phoenix, Arizona, and the daughter of James Willis Hensley, a wealthy Anheuser-Busch beer distributor, and Marguerite "Smitty" Hensley. They began dating, travelling between Arizona and Washington to see each other, and John McCain urged his wife Carol to accept a divorce. The McCains stopped cohabiting in January 1980, and John McCain filed for divorce in February, which Carol McCain accepted at that time. After she did not respond to court summonses, the uncontested divorce became official in Fort Walton Beach, Florida, on April 2, 1980. McCain gave Carol a settlement that included full custody of their children, alimony, child support including college tuition, houses in Virginia and Florida, and lifelong financial support for her ongoing medical treatments resulting from the 1969 automobile accident; they would remain on good terms. McCain and Hensley were married on May 17, 1980, in Phoenix, with Senators William Cohen and Gary Hart as best man and groomsman. McCain's children were upset with him and did not attend the wedding, but after several years they reconciled with him and Cindy. Carol McCain became a personal assistant to Nancy Reagan and later Director of the White House Visitors Office. The Reagans were stunned by the divorce; Nancy Reagan's relationship with John McCain turned cold for a while following it, but eventually the two renewed their friendship. The same happened with most of McCain's other friends, who were eventually won over by the force of his personality and his frequent expressions of guilt over what had happened.

Around the end of 1980, McCain decided to retire from the Navy. He had not been given a major sea command, and his physical condition had deteriorated, causing him to fail the flight physical required for any carrier command position (in addition to his limited arm movement, certain weather would always cause him to walk with a limp). McCain thought he might make rear admiral, but probably not vice admiral, and never become a four-star admiral as his grandfather and father had been. McCain later wrote that he did not anguish over his decision, although it pained his mother, who thought congressional careers paled in comparison to top naval ones. He was excited by the idea of being a member of Congress and was soon recruiting a campaign manager that Cohen knew, for a planned run at a House seat from Arizona. In early 1981, Secretary of the Navy John F. Lehman, who did not want to see McCain leave the liaison post, told McCain that he was still on the path to be selected for one-star rear admiral. McCain told Lehman that he was leaving the Navy and that he could "do more good" in Congress.

McCain retired with an effective date of April 1, 1981, the rank of captain, and a disability pension due to his wartime injuries. For his service in the Senate liaison office, McCain was awarded a gold star in lieu of a second award of the Legion of Merit. Jack McCain died on March 22, 1981. On March 27, 1981, McCain attended his father's funeral at Arlington National Cemetery, wearing his uniform for the last time before signing his discharge papers, and later that day flew to Phoenix with his wife Cindy to begin his new life.

== Military awards ==
McCain's military decorations and awards include:

Naval Aviator badge
Silver Star Medal
Legion of Merit with Combat "V" and Star	Distinguished Flying Cross	Bronze Star Medal with Combat "V" and two Stars
Purple Heart Medal with Star	Meritorious Service Medal	Air Medal with star and Strike/Flight numeral "2"
Navy and Marine Corps Commendation Medal with Combat "V" and Star	Navy Combat Action Ribbon	Navy Unit Commendation
Navy Meritorious Unit Commendation	Prisoner of War Medal	Navy Expeditionary Medal
National Defense Service Medal with star	Armed Forces Expeditionary Medal	Vietnam Service Medal with two stars
Republic of Vietnam National Order of Vietnam (Commander)	Republic of Vietnam Meritorious Unit Citation (Gallantry Cross) with frame and palm	Republic of Vietnam Campaign Medal with 1960- device

=== Citations ===
These are some of the citations associated with the awards:

- Silver Star Medal
- Legion of Merit
  - First award (with "V" device)
  - Second award (gold star)
- Distinguished Flying Cross
- Bronze Star Medal
  - First award (with "V" device)
  - Second award (gold star; with "V" device)
  - Third award (gold star; with "V" device)
- Meritorious Service Medal
- Air Medal
  - First award (with bronze star)
  - Second award (numeral "2")
- Navy Commendation Medal
  - First award (with "V" device)
  - Second award (gold star; with "V" device)

== Bibliography ==
- Alexander, Paul (2002). Man of the People: The Life of John McCain. Hoboken, New Jersey: John Wiley & Sons. ISBN 0-471-22829-X.
- Brace, Ernest C. (1988). A Code to Keep: The true story of America's longest held civilian prisoner of war in Vietnam. New York: St. Martin's Press. ISBN 0-7090-3560-8.
- Coram, Robert (2007). American Patriot: The Life and Wars Of Colonel Bud Day. New York: Little, Brown and Company. ISBN 978-0-316-75847-5.
- Feinberg, Barbara Silberdick (2000). John McCain: Serving His Country. Brookfield, Connecticut: Millbrook Press. ISBN 0-7613-1974-3.
- Frankum, Ronald Bruce (2005). Like Rolling Thunder: The Air War In Vietnam 1964–1975. Lanham, Maryland: Rowman & Littlefield. ISBN 0-7425-4302-1.
- Freeman, Gregory A. (2002). Sailors to the End: The Deadly Fire on the USS Forrestal and the Heroes Who Fought It. New York: HarperCollins. ISBN 0-06-093690-8.
- Hubbell, John G. (1976). P.O.W.: A Definitive History of the American Prisoner-Of-War Experience in Vietnam, 1964–1973. New York: Reader's Digest Press. ISBN 0-88349-091-9.
- Karaagac, John (2000). John McCain: An Essay in Military and Political History. Lanham, Maryland: Lexington Books. ISBN 0-7391-0171-4.
- McCain, John; Salter, Mark (1999). Faith of My Fathers. New York: Random House. ISBN 0-375-50191-6.
- McCain, John; Salter, Mark (2002). Worth the Fighting For. New York: Random House. ISBN 0-375-50542-3.
- Philpott, Tom (2001). Glory Denied: The Saga of Jim Thompson, America's Longest-held Prisoner. New York: W. W. Norton. ISBN 0-393-02012-6.
- Rochester, Stuart I.; Kiley, Frederick (1999). Honor Bound: American Prisoners of War in Southeast Asia, 1961–1973. Annapolis, Maryland: Naval Institute Press. ISBN 1-55750-694-9.
- Timberg, Robert (1996). The Nightingale's Song. New York: Simon & Schuster. ISBN 0-684-80301-1.
- Timberg, Robert (1999). John McCain: An American Odyssey. New York: Touchstone Books. ISBN 0-684-86794-X.
