= Timberg =

Timberg is a surname. Notable people with the surname include:

- Herman Timberg (1891–1952), American vaudevillian, actor and songwriter
- Nathalia Timberg (born 1929), Brazilian actress
- Robert Timberg (1940–2016), American journalist and author
- Sammy Timberg (1903–1992), American musician and composer
- Scott Timberg (1969–2019), American journalist and author
