= 163 Squadron =

163 Squadron may refer to:

- No. 163 Squadron RAF, United Kingdom
- 163 Squadron, Republic of Singapore Air Force; see list of Republic of Singapore Air Force squadrons
- 163d Aero Squadron, United States Army Air Service
- 163rd Fighter Squadron, United States Air Force
- VA-163 (U.S. Navy)
- VMM-163, United States Marine Corps
