= Trúc Bạch Lake =

Lake in Hanoi, Vietnam

- Hồ Trúc Bạch (Vietnamese)
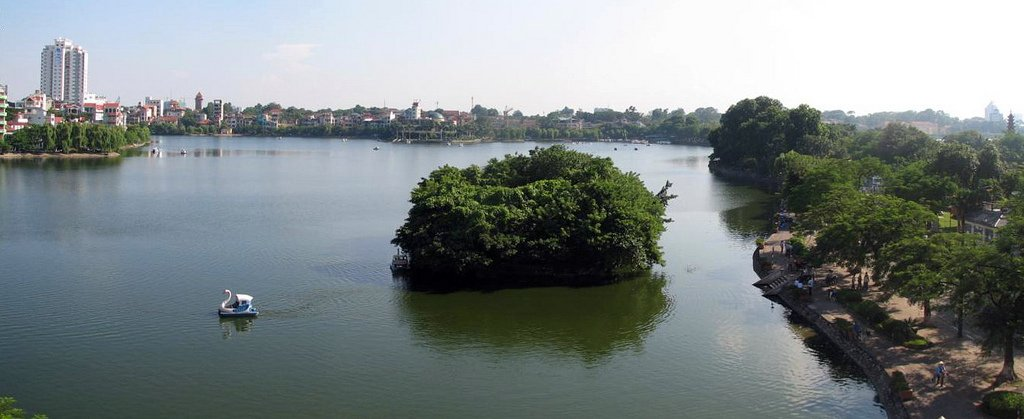

- Location within Vietnam
- Location: Hanoi
- Coordinates: 21°2′44″N 105°50′17″E
- Type: oxbow
- Basin countries: Vietnam
- Max. length: ca 400 m (1,300 ft)
- Max. width: ca 300 m (980 ft)
- Surface area: ca 9 ha (22 acres)
- Surface elevation: ca 15 m (49 ft)
- Islands: a 20 m (66 ft) in the northwest

Trúc Bạch Lake (Vietnamese: Hồ Trúc Bạch) is one of the many lakes in the city of Hanoi, the capital of Vietnam. It is known outside Vietnam as the site where future United States politician John McCain landed during the Vietnam War after being shot down.

Trúc Bạch Lake is located northwest of Hanoi's Old Quarter, immediately adjacent to the eastern shore of the city's largest lake, the West Lake (Hồ Tây), a former branch of the Red River whose west bank is nearby. Trúc Bạch Lake was separated from the West Lake by the construction of a narrow dike (Cố Ngự, "reinforcement", but later people read it incorrectly as Cổ Ngư) in the 17th century to allow raising fish. The inhabitants of the Truc Yen Village, located on the south shore of the newly formed lake, were in the business of making bamboo blinds and hence cultivated a small variety of bamboo. In 1957 and 1958, major Thanh Niên Road was built between the lakes. In 1730s, the Trịnh Lord Trịnh Giang had Trúc Lâm Palace constructed on the lake shore. The building first served as a pleasure palace but was later converted into a prison for royal concubines found guilty of crime. The silk they produced, known as "Bamboo Village Silk" became famous for its beauty.

The lake front is open only along Thanh Niên Road, the other sides are occupied by houses and residential streets. The lake is among the most seriously polluted in Hanoi. Nearby historical sites include: Quán Thánh Temple to the southwest of the lake, Châu Long Pagoda to the east, An Trì Temple (dedicated to the worship of a hero from the war against the Chinese Yuan dynasty) on Phó Đức Chính Street, and Cẩu Nhi temple on a small hill near the northern corner of the lake.

== Trúc Bạch war monument ==
On October 26, 1967, during the Vietnam War, US Navy aviator John McCain was shot down by an anti-aircraft missile on a mission against a Hanoi power plant and parachuted wounded into Trúc Bạch Lake. He was dragged out of the water, confronted by angry North Vietnamese and turned over to the military as a prisoner of war. A monument commemorating the capture (not, as sometimes claimed, McCain's detention) was erected in 1985 on the western shore on Thanh Niên Road. Its inscription reads:

On 26 October 1967 near Trúc Bạch Lake, citizens and military of the capital Hanoi captured US Navy Air Forces pilot Major [sic] John Sidney McCain, who was flying an A-4 aircraft that crashed near Yên Phụ power station. This was one of ten aircraft shot down that day.

Although the monument was not built to honor McCain, some visitors to Hanoi have chosen to pay respects to him there. In 2015 the monument was cleaned at McCain's request and the inscription was revised to correct his name, remove the derogatory epithet "tên", and identify his service branch as Navy rather than Air Force.

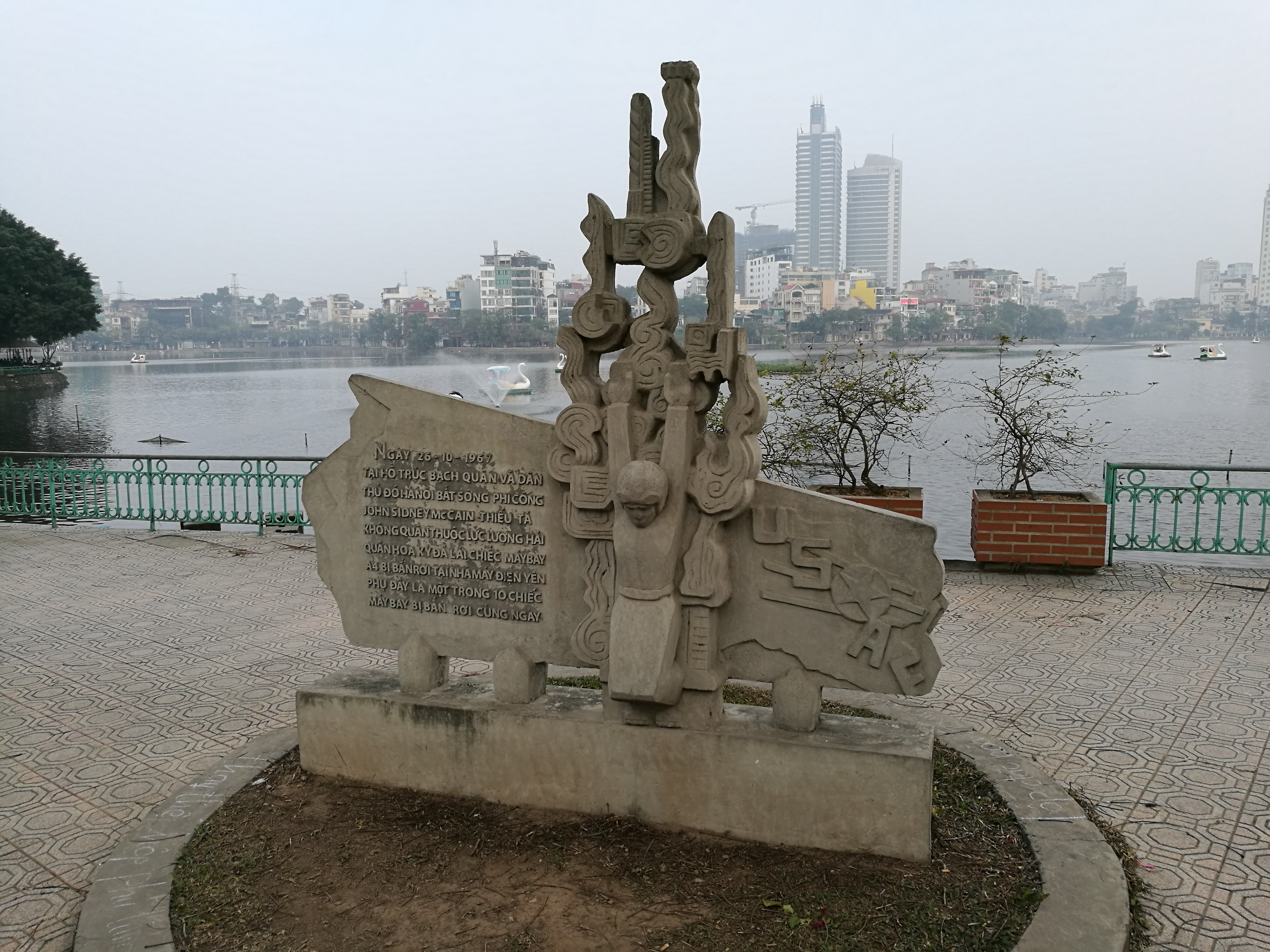
John McCain monument at Trúc Bạch Lake

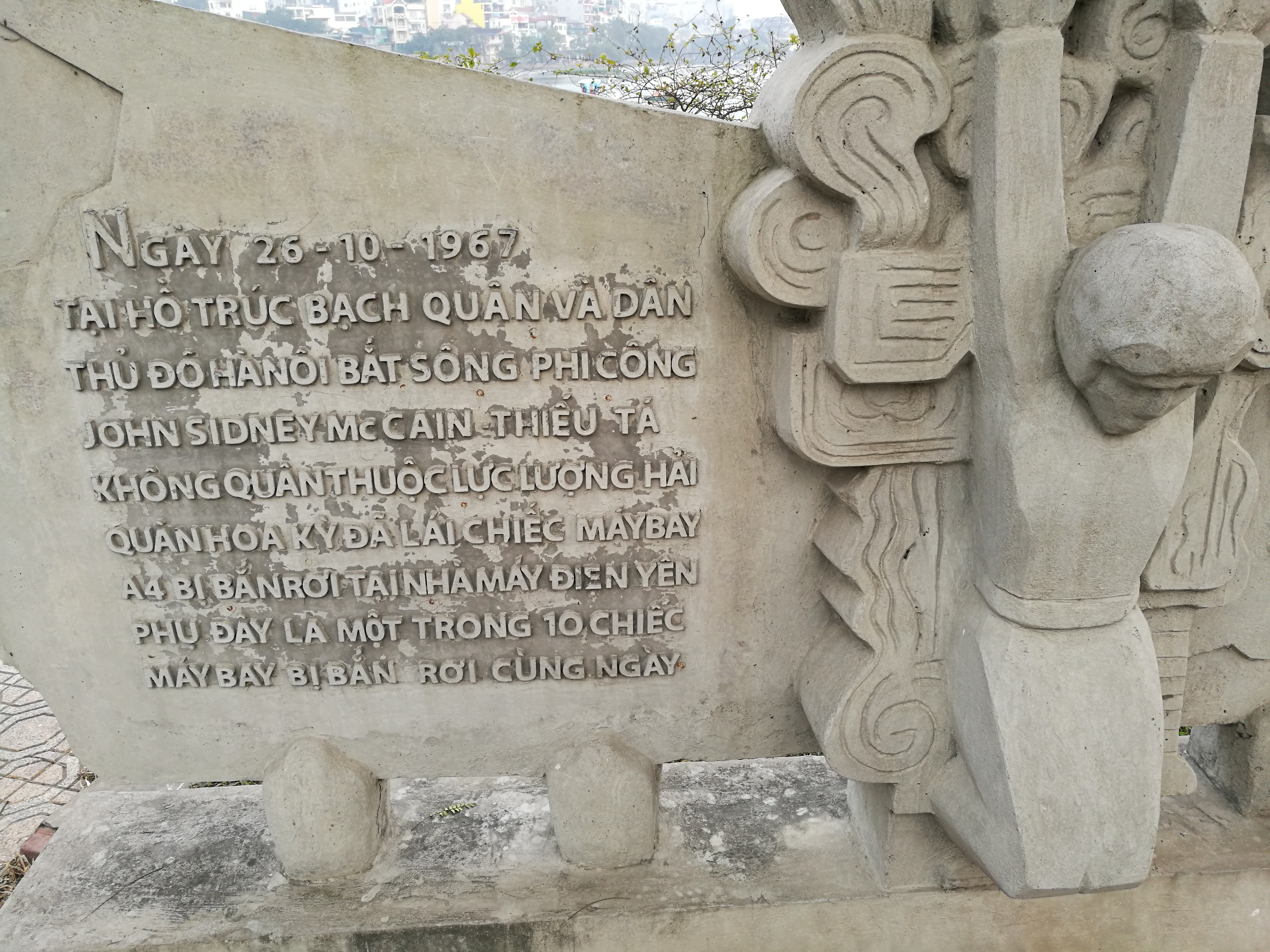
Text detail

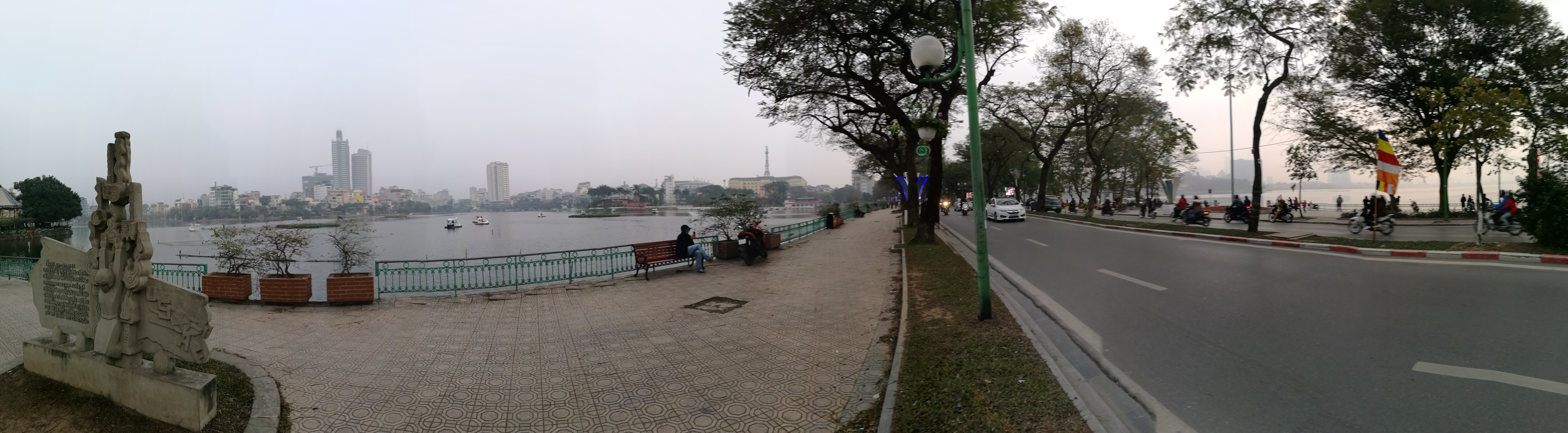
Panoramic view
