= Office of Legislative Affairs (United States Navy) =

The Office of Legislative Affairs is a United States Navy function which coordinates activities between the Department of the Navy and the United States Congress.

The office reports to the Secretary of the Navy and the Chief of Naval Operations. Its relationships with Congress include policy discussions, briefings and posture statements, comments on pending legislation, and supporting and hosting congressional visits and travel. It has a Senate Liaison Office located in the Russell Senate Office Building and a House Liaison Office located in the Rayburn House Office Building.

The current Chief of Legislative Affairs is Rear Admiral (RADM) Marc J. Miguez.

Future senator and presidential candidate John McCain served in the Senate Liaison Office during 1977–1981, which introduced him to the world of politics.
