= Scott Timberg =

American journalist, culture writer, and editor (1969–2019)

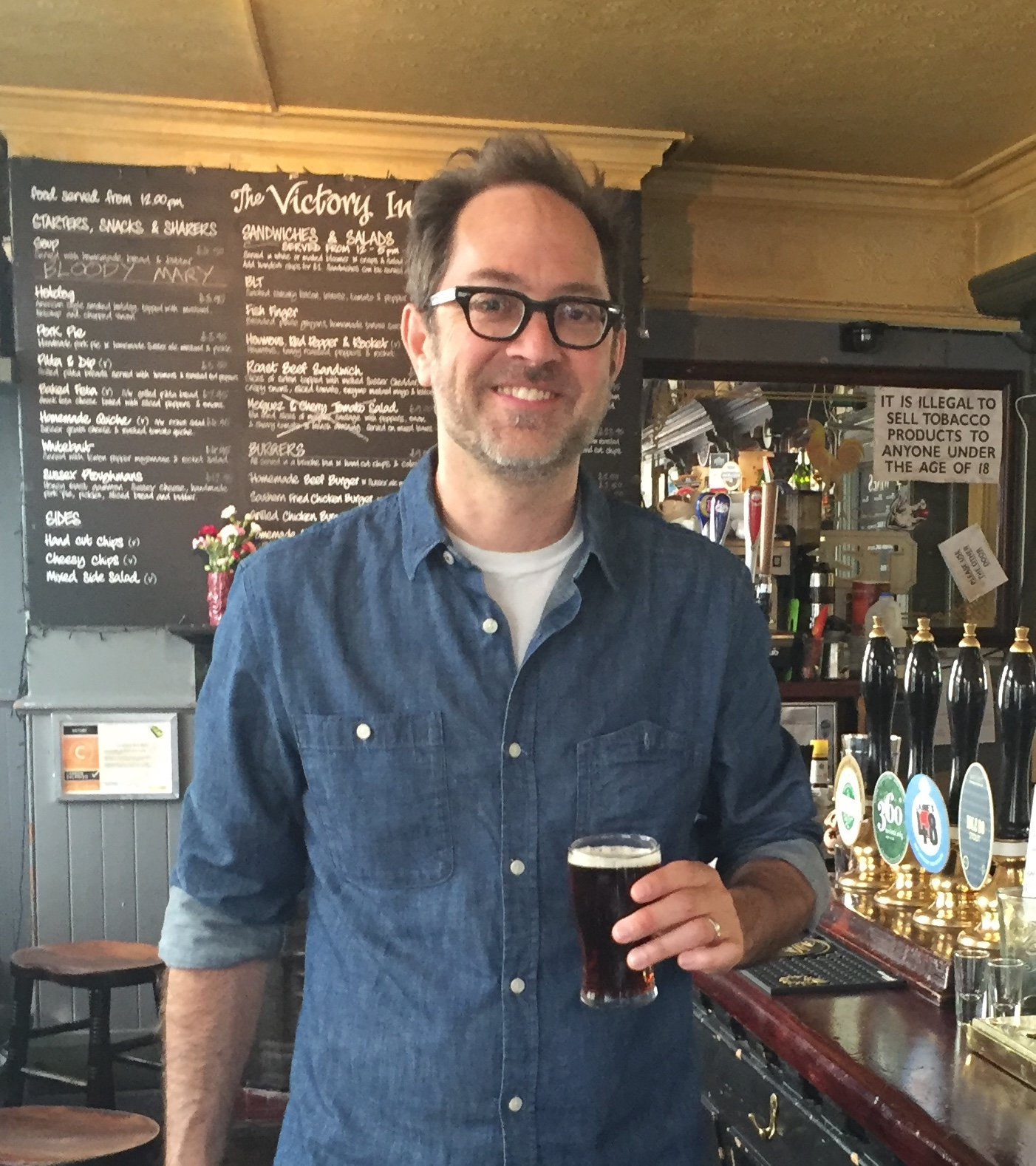
- Born: February 15, 1969; Palo Alto, California, U.S.
- Died: December 10, 2019 (aged 50); Los Angeles, California, U.S.
- Education: Wesleyan University (BA); University of North Carolina at Chapel Hill
- Occupations: Journalist, author, and editor
- Spouse: Sara Scribner
- Children: 1
- Parent(s): Robert Timberg, Jane Timberg

Scott Timberg (February 15, 1969 – December 10, 2019) was an American journalist, culture writer, and editor. He was best known as an authority on southern California culture and for his book Culture Crash: The Killing of the Creative Class.

== Early life ==
Scott Robert Timberg was born in Palo Alto, California, son of journalist and author Robert Timberg and Jane Timberg. He was raised in Maryland. Timberg earned a Bachelor of Arts from Wesleyan University in 1991 and a master’s degree in journalism from the University of North Carolina at Chapel Hill. He attended a term abroad at the University of Sussex. His grandfather was composer Sammy Timberg and his great uncle was vaudevillian Herman Timberg.

== Career ==
Timberg started his journalism career at The Day in Connecticut. He moved to Los Angeles in 1997 to join the staff of New Times LA. He was a long-time staff writer for the Los Angeles Times until 2008 and a staff writer for Salon. As a freelancer he wrote for the Los Angeles Review of Books, The New York Times and Los Angeles Magazine, among others. Timberg spent the longest period of his life in Los Angeles, with a year in Athens, Georgia in 2015.

== Books ==
- The Misread City: New Literary Los Angeles (editor, with Dana Gioia) (2003)
- Culture Crash: The Killing of the Creative Class (2015)
- Beeswing: Fairport, Folk Rock and Finding My Voice, 1967–75 (co-written with Richard Thompson) (2021)

== Writings about Timberg ==
- Various, Remembering Scott Timberg (Los Angeles Review of Books) (2019)
- Christopher Reynolds, Scott Timberg, spirited listener, reader and writer is dead at 50 (LA Times) (2019)
- Dana Gioia, Scott Timberg: a bitter symbol for those who have been marginalized by our “creative culture" (The Book Haven) (2019)

== Awards ==
Timberg's book Culture Crash: The Killing of the Creative Class won the National Arts & Entertainment Journalism Award in 2015. The New Yorker called it "a quietly radical rethinking of the very nature of art in modern life".

== Personal life and death ==
Timberg married Sara Scribner, a school librarian and journalist; the couple had a son.

Timberg committed suicide on December 10, 2019, in Los Angeles, at the age of 50.
