= VA-46 (U.S. Navy) =

Attack Squadron 46
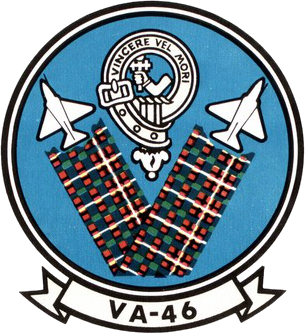
- VA-46 insignia
- Active: 24 May 1955 – 30 June 1991
- Country: United States
- Branch: United States Navy
- Type: All Weather Attack
- Part of: Inactive
- Nickname: Clansmen
- Mottos: "Vincere Vel Mori" "To conquer or to die"
- Engagements: Vietnam War; Operation Rolling Thunder; 1967 USS Forrestal fire; Operation El Dorado Canyon; Operation Desert Storm

Aircraft flown
- Attack: A-4 Skyhawk; A-7 Corsair II
- Fighter: F9F Panther; F9F Cougar

Attack Squadron 46 (VA-46 or ATKRON 46) was an attack squadron of the United States Navy that was active during the Cold War. VA-46 was deactivated as part of the post-Cold War drawdown of forces on 30 June 1991.

== History ==
VA-46 was nicknamed the "Clansmen" and they were based out of Naval Air Station Cecil Field, Florida. The squadron's Scottish identity was chosen by its first commander, Clifford A. McDougal and incorporated the McDougal clan tartan in its insignia. The squadron flew during the Vietnam War and was on board the aircraft carrier USS Forrestal in 1967 when a fatal fire broke out on the flight deck killing 134 sailors. In 1986, they took part in strikes against Libya known as Operation El Dorado Canyon, and their last combat action was seen during Operation Desert Storm in 1991.

=== Early years ===
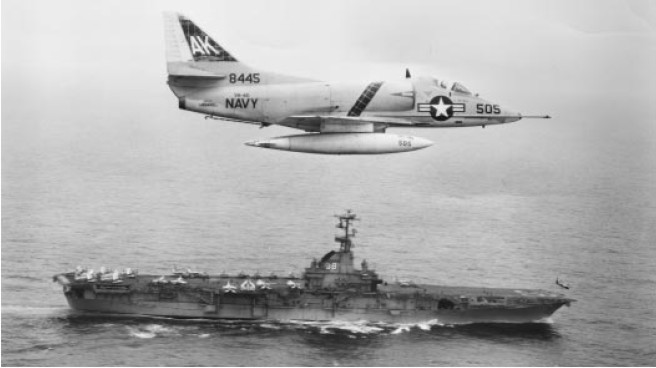
An A-4C of VA-46 flies past USS Shangri-La in 1965.

Attack Squadron 46 was formed at Naval Air Station Cecil Field on 24 May 1955 flying F9F-5 Grumman Panther. They departed the United States for their first deployment to the Mediterranean Sea on 14 July 1956, aboard USS Randolph with F9F-8 Grumman Cougar. This was the first overseas deployment of the AIM-9 Sidewinder. In October and November 1956 the squadron, along with other units of ATG-202, provided air support for the evacuation of foreign nationals from Alexandria, Egypt during the Suez Crisis. VA-46 received A4D-2 Douglas Skyhawk in March 1958. In August 1965, VA-46 was on board USS Shangri-La and operated off the coast of Cyprus in response to a crisis in that country between Greek and Turkish Cypriots.

=== Vietnam War ===
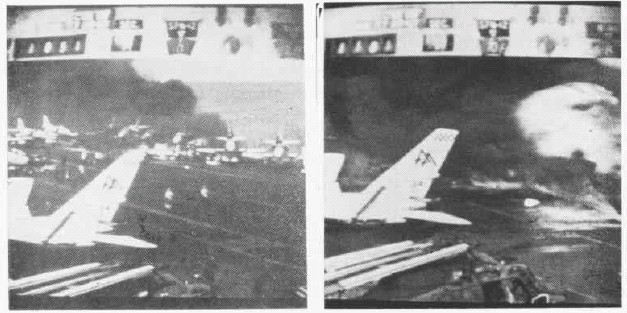
VA-46 A-4Es burst into flames on 29 July 1967 aboard USS Forrestal.

On 25 July 1967, the Clansmen took part in their first combat operations during the Vietnam War flying from USS Forrestal on Yankee Station. A few days later on 29 July, while aircraft were being prepared for the second launch of the day against targets in North Vietnam, a fire broke out on the flight deck of Forrestal. Flames engulfed the fantail and spread below decks, touching off bombs and ammunition. Heroic efforts by VA-46 personnel, along with other members of Carrier Air Wing 17 and ship's company, brought the fires under control. Damage to the carrier and aircraft was severe, and the casualty count included 134 dead and 62 injured. The squadron lost seven A-4E Skyhawks during the fire. At the epicenter of the fire was squadron member and then Lieutenant Commander John McCain. He escaped from his burning jet and was trying to help another pilot escape when a bomb exploded; he was struck in the legs and chest by fragments.

=== Transition and the 1970s ===
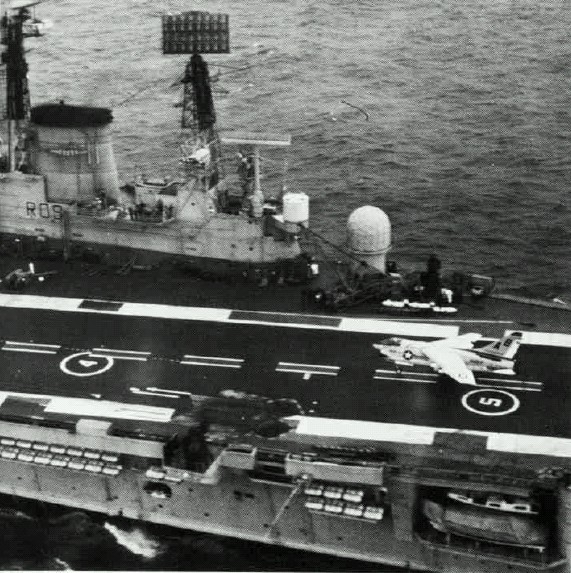
A VA-46 A-7E landing on HMS Ark Royal in 1976.

From 4 May through 15 November 1968, VA-46 transitioned to the A-7 Corsair II. On 17 September 1970, while en route to the Caribbean for training exercises on board USS John F. Kennedy, they received emergency orders to deploy immediately to the Mediterranean due to the hijacking of four airliners by members of the Popular Front for the Liberation of Palestine. They remained on station off the coast of Israel until November. During October 1973, with the outbreak of the Yom Kippur War between Israel, Egypt and Syria, John F. Kennedy and her air wing, while operating in the North Atlantic after just completing a Mediterranean deployment, were ordered back to the Mediterranean. During the latter part of October through mid-November, VA-46 conducted flight operations while the carrier was on station south of Crete. On 22 November 1975 during night operations, John F. Kennedy collided with USS Belknap, causing major damage to the cruiser. Eight VA-46 personnel received awards for their heroism and devotion to duty as a result of their actions following the collision.

=== 1980s, Gulf War and decommissioning ===
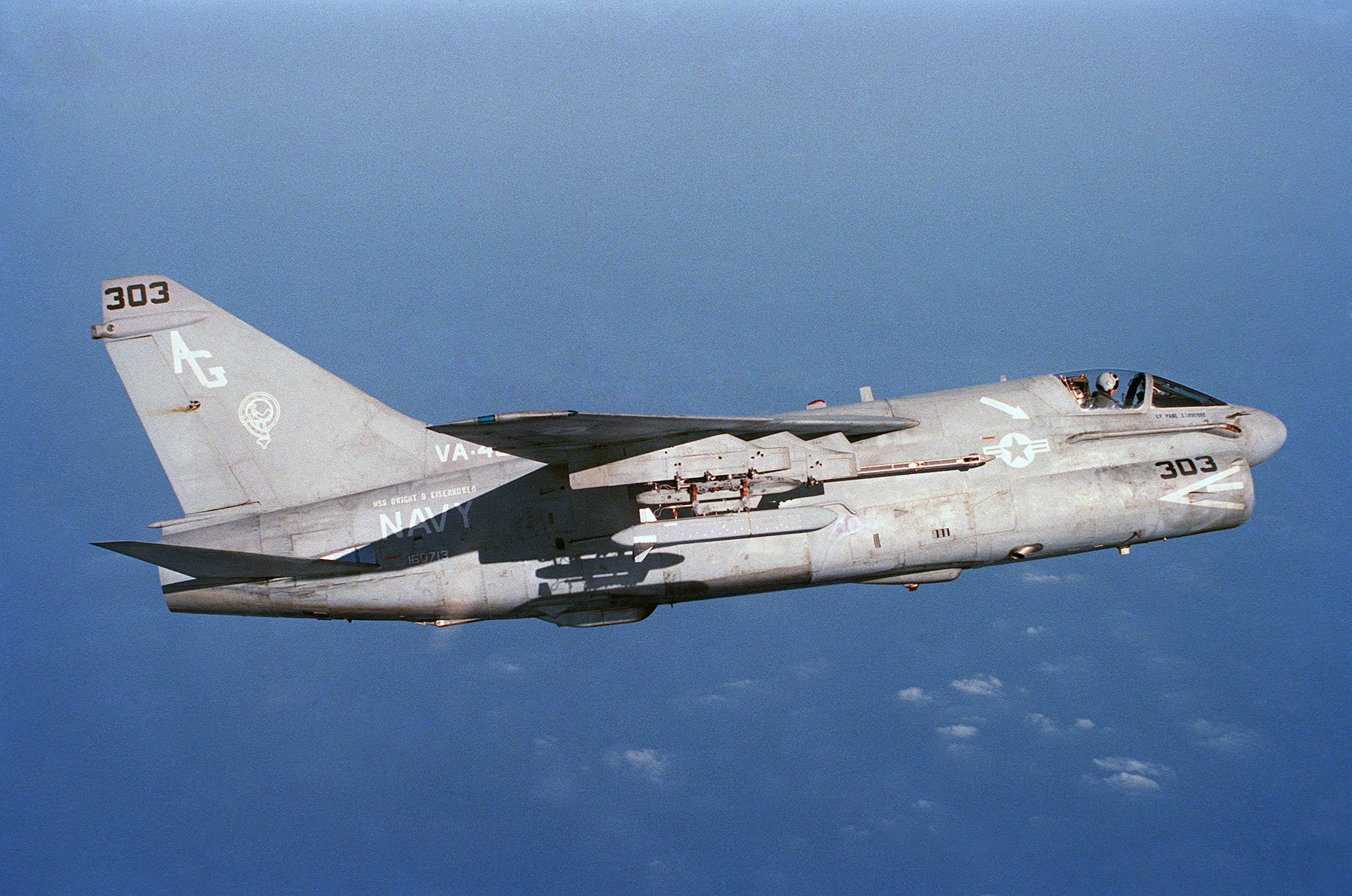
An A-7 Corsair II from VA-46 in July 1988

From 17 to 19 September 1985, VA-46 – along with other units of Carrier Air Wing 1 (CVW-1) – were the first to conduct flight operations from a carrier operating inside a fjord. USS America operated in Flekkefjord, Norway during this evolution. The next year on 14 April 1986, as a response to terrorist actions, the squadron took part in strikes against targets in Libya. During that action, VA-46 provided air-to-surface Shrike and Harm missile strikes against Libyan radar missile sites. Beginning on 17 January 1991, the squadron took part in Operation Desert Storm, the combat operations to remove Iraqi forces from Kuwait. The squadron's A-7E Corsair IIs participated in the first combat strike against Iraqi targets in Baghdad, and VA-46 and VA-72 made the last combat sorties of the A-7 Corsair II during Desert Storm flying from the Red Sea. Upon their return from the Persian Gulf they were decommissioned on 30 June 1991. VA-46 was the last United States Navy squadron to fly the A-7 Corsair II.

== Surviving aircraft ==
- A-7E Corsairs with VA-46 markings are on static display at Heritage Park on Naval Air Station Jacksonville, Florida, Patriots Point Naval & Maritime Museum, Mount Pleasant, SC, Heritage In Flight Museum, Lincoln, IL, Jacksonville University - NROTC, Jacksonville Florida, Pima Air & Space Museum, Tucson Arizona and at the National Naval Aviation Museum in Pensacola, Florida.
- An A4D-2 Skyhawk (BuNo 142741) with VA-46 markings is on display at the National Vietnam War Museum in Orlando, Florida.
- Pima Air and Space Museum has on display a Corsair that wears the markings of VA-46 (Navy Attack Squadron 46) USS John F. Kennedy circa 1991. The markings below the cockpit of Serial Number 160713 indicate the actual number of bombs dropped by this aircraft rather than the number of missions flown.

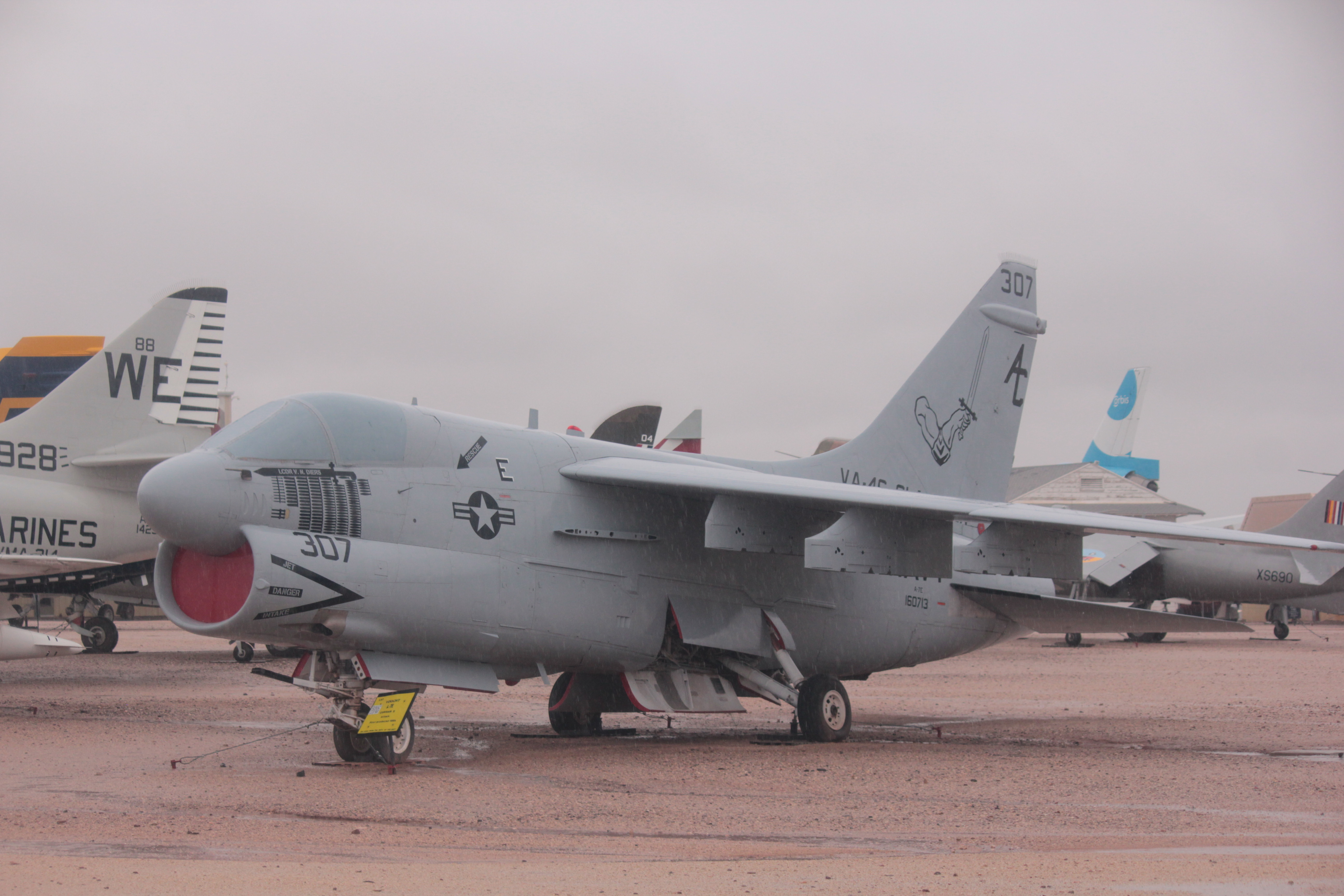
VA-46 Aircraft at Pima Air Museum

== See also ==
- History of the United States Navy
- List of inactive United States Navy aircraft squadrons
- List of United States Navy aircraft squadrons
