= The Nightingale's Song =

1995 nonfiction book by Robert Timberg

- Author: Robert Timberg
- Language: English
- Publisher: Simon & Schuster
- Publication date: 1995
- Media type: Hardcover
- Pages: 544
- ISBN: 0-684-80301-1
- OCLC: 32015311
- Dewey Decimal: 327.73 20
- LC Class: E876 .T55 1995

John McCain: An American Odyssey
- Author: Robert Timberg
- Language: English
- Publisher: Touchstone Books
- Publication date: 1999
- Media type: Softcover
- Pages: 235
- ISBN: 0-684-86794-X

The Nightingale's Song is a 1995 book by Baltimore Sun journalist Robert Timberg. It relates the military and political careers of five graduates of the United States Naval Academy, most of whom served during the Vietnam War in either the United States Navy or United States Marine Corps: John McCain, Bud McFarlane, Oliver North, John Poindexter, and Jim Webb. Timberg himself was also a Naval Academy graduate and served in Vietnam with the Marine Corps, where he was badly wounded.

The book examines how both the Annapolis and the Vietnam experiences shaped the different characters portrayed, and how it foreshadowed their political careers, and for some, their involvement in the Iran-Contra affair.

The Nightingale's Song received generally strong reviews, with Geoffrey Norman in American Way stating that the individual narratives taken collectively "become something greater than the sum of their parts. They take the reader on an odyssey across some of the hardest terrain of recent American history." The New York Times listed it as a "Notable Book of the Year" and Time magazine selected it as one of the year's five best works of nonfiction. Its sales were modest.

In 1999, while Senator John McCain was campaigning for the Republican Party's nomination for president, Timberg excerpted the portions of The Nightingale's Song pertaining to McCain, augmented them with some early and recent biographical material, and put together another book, John McCain: An American Odyssey. It was in turn subsequently reissued by the Free Press in 2007, in conjunction with McCain's 2008 presidential nomination campaign, with a new foreword containing some updates on McCain in the 2000s.
