= Herman Timberg =

American actor and songwriter (1891–1952)

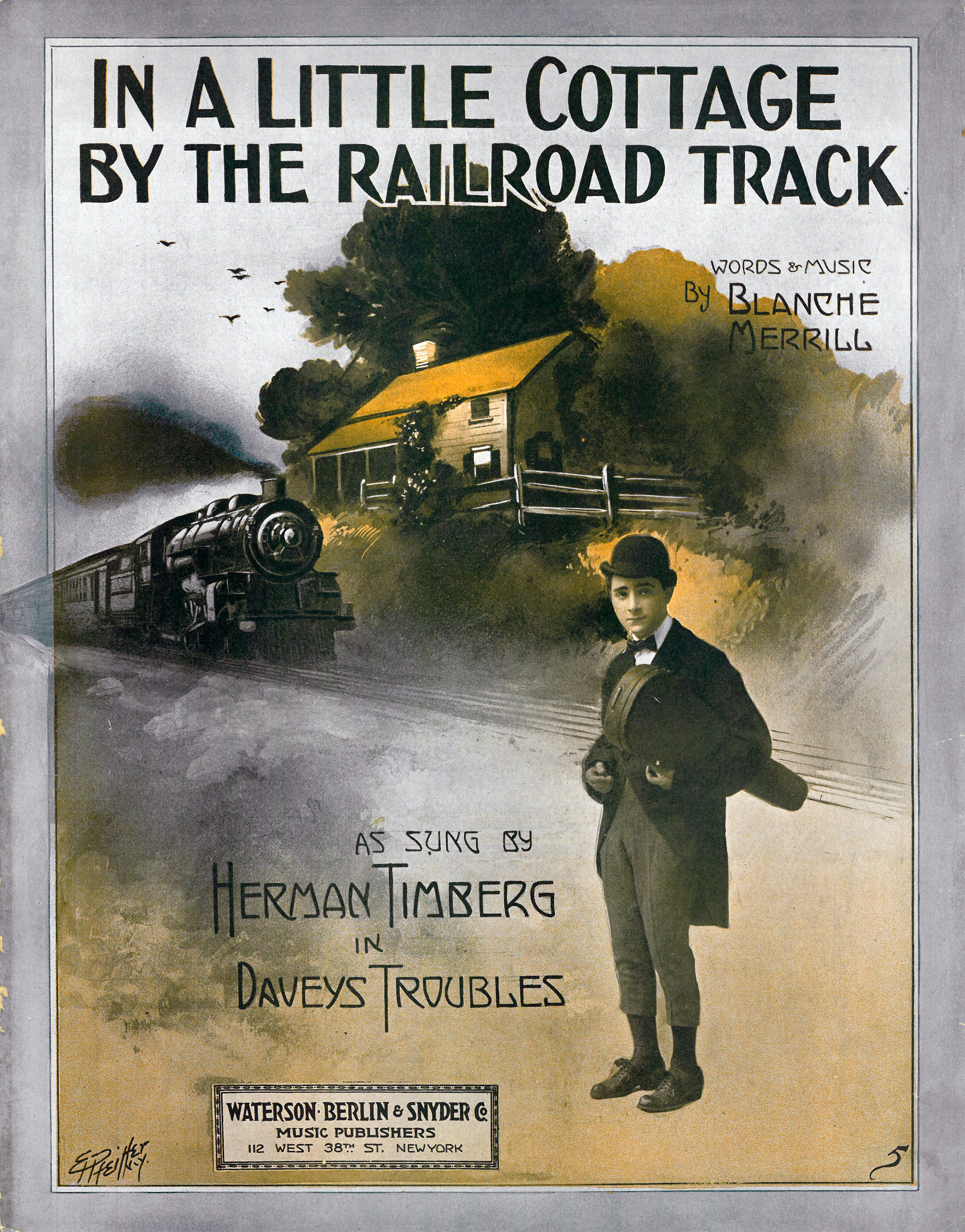
Sheet music cover of a 1913 song showing a retouched photograph of Herman Timberg (click to enlarge)

Herman Timberg (April 18, 1891 – April 16, 1952) was a vaudevillian, actor and songwriter, a writer of sketches and dialogue for vaudeville and musicals, "active in nearly every field of show business". He was the brother of composer Sammy Timberg and uncle of the journalist Robert Timberg.

== 1906 to 1929 ==
Herman Timberg was born April 18, 1891, to a Jewish family originating in Austria. While a teen he appeared in Gus Edwards's teenage acting troupe, "School Girls and School Boys" performing the one-act sketch comedy Primary No. 23. An unnamed critic noted that Timberg "caught exactly the flavor of the traditional Hebrew comedian...He was there with the inevitable parodies, which received the usual applause." When the show played in Chicago in 1907, a critic noted: "Herman Timberg in a Hebrew boy character displayed genuine talent that promises to place him among the coming comedians." This was confirmed by another critic who caught the group on tour at the Alhambra Theatre in Los Angeles: "Herman Timberg is the bright particular star of the little company. The boy has developed into a real comedian, and is a great little worker, just busy all the time. His first-rate singing voice, clever dancing and natural comedy ability gives him a wide scope. Timberg never tires." Each season the Gus Edwards troop was retooled based on the talents of who was in the group at the time. By 1911, Timberg had achieved the distinction of being able to sing a solo song, "Love Me to a Yiddsha Melody."

Timberg's first solo attempt came in 1912 but was not received well. The reviewer wrote that the initial song followed by a five-minute monologue was ineffective, and suggested he drop the Jewish impersonation in favor of a characterization that could stand for "any foolish kid."

The following year, Timberg married Hazel Rosebloom. In addition to announcing his wedding, Variety said that Timberg was to star in a play, Davy's Debut by Joe LeBrandt (the play was never produced).

Over the course of his varied career Timberg appeared in many vaudeville acts. A 1919 notice advertises Chicken Chow Mein being produced by Timberg and playing in Brighton Beach the week of August 18, with an opening scheduled at the Palace Theatre for September 1, 1919.

Beginning at least in 1920, Timberg often teamed with other performers. In 1920 he was performing "Little Bits" at the Palace, a sixteen-minute long skit with his sister Hattie Darling. A critic related that both played violins and both danced—Herman to a Russian step and Hattie to a waltz. This was followed by Herman doing a single dance, then both singing an interrupted duet, followed by imitations. One critic concluded that the act was too much to function as the penultimate number of the evening. By the time the act moved to the Brighton Theatre, another critic complimented Timberg calling him a "versatile artist, doing many things, and doing them well." This critic still complained of the Yiddish accent but was happy that no Yiddish phrases were used, noting that the imitations included portrayals of Al Jolson, Lew Fields, and George M. Cohan.

By 1922, he had founded the "Herman Timberg Producing Company" whose purpose was to provide financial support in return for a portion of Timberg's profits. That year he was sued by the Company whose backers included "Garry" Herrmann (a baseball magnate), Sol Gilsey, and others from Cincinnati. They asked for an accounting of receipts from his show Tick-Tack-Toe and for $40,000 which they had advanced him. As announced in Billboard, an "amicable settlement [was] expected." He was performing in Cleveland by mid-April 1923. By May, he was back in New York City, appearing at Loew's State Theatre in New York again with his sister Hattie Darling, this time also with his brother Sammy. By 1924 his popularity was such that Variety was able to report that "...his comedy dances were so vociferously encored they would not allow [him] to continue with the violin."

== 1929 to 1952 ==
The fall of 1929 was a significant time for Timberg. It was announced that rehearsals would begin on September 19 for his show Take It Easy written by Timberg with music composed by his brother Sammy Timberg. The show was announced to have tryouts in Brooklyn and Newark, and "may open on Broadway late next month" (that is, October). The Brooklyn Eagle announced that the show would play for one week commencing October 20, 1929. Notably, the announcement mentioned that the entire show would be broadcast over station WLTH. The Broadway production apparently never came to pass, probably due in part to the Wall Street crash of 1929. Timberg reportedly had saved a great deal of money from stage appearances that was lost in the Crash. His subsequent career was marked by the continuation of his varied activities orbiting around performing (now usually with comic foils), writing, and occasionally producing.

An exception to his stage activities was film. In 1931 he wrote and appeared in the MGM short Ambitious People. In an interview that same year he was quoted saying of a new playwright: "He knows nothing about dialogue or building up a situation. He doesn't know upstage from downstage or a border light from a fly gallery. But he knows all the dirty stories in the world."

In 1933, he appeared in Laff It Off, a paired double act with his son Herman Jr. (later known as the comedian Tim Herbert) and with Pat Rooney and his son Pat. Jr. Later that year, "the diminutive dance comedian" (the description given to Timberg by the New York Sun) presented a new version of his skit "The Laugh Factory" at the Metropolitan Theatre and was again assisted by his son Herman Timberg Jr., along with Audrey Parker, Leo Chalzel and Oliver Harris.

His June 1934 appearance at the Palace Theatre in a 53-minute act called Temptations occasioned a number of reviews. The New York Herald Tribune said that Timberg "offers in rapid succession all of the comedian's tested variety routines." But Variety was more critical: "At 53 minutes, [it] moves too slowly, though some moments go fast." The review suggested "there's too much talking and too many repetitions of the same effect, such as engaging in dialogue with more than 2 chorines." The reviewer complimented his partner, Audrey Parker, but concluded that Timberg "has a show with plenty of comedy and flash, but it needs to be broken up more with specialties."

In addition to continuing his vaudeville appearances, Timberg was apparently aiming for work on a complete Broadway show. In 1936 it was reported that he had been engaged by Jack Curtis and Carlteton Hoagland to adapt the London musical Yes, Madam for Broadway. Apparently nothing came of this effort.

In 1946, Timberg was said to be working on a comedy for actor Hugh Herbert, "said to have a Park Avenue background." That same year there was a casting call for a play, Knickerbocker's Children authored by Ben Levinson and Herman Timberg. Neither of these efforts appear to have come to fruition.

In 1949, Timberg, "who's been on the boards for more years than he may care to admit", was appearing with the youthful Graham Sisters. As if recalling his earlier acts, Variety reported that "Timberg hasn't lost his skill at dancing or comedies and fiddling." One of his last appearances was at the Palace Theatre where, "nearly blind, he did an energetic turn with a femme foil which called for extremely fast movement and trick violin playing. The act was excellently received." His obituary noted that he was known for the Timberg "crawl-off", a comic maneuver in which he exited the stage crawling on all fours.

At the twilight of his life, Timberg was living at the Greystone Hotel at 212 West 91st Street (on Broadway) in Manhattan, New York. Timberg died on April 16, 1952, at Memorial Hospital in New York City "after a long illness".

== Family ==
Timberg married Hazel Rosenbloom on November 26, 1913. Under her stage name, Hazel Rosewood, she was a dancer in shows such as those produced by Gus Edwards as well as in the Ziegfeld Follies. She had been appearing in the musical All Aboard prior to marriage. She died August 21, 1960, aged 68. Survivors included two sons, Irwin and Tim Herbert (a comedian), two sisters and two brothers.

Timberg's nephew was Jesse Kaye, booking agent for the Roxy and Loews, and later head of artists and repertory for MGM Records. Another nephew was the journalist Robert Timberg.

== Broadway Appearances ==
Information from IBDB.

- 1908: School Days (performer)
- 1916: Passing Show of 1916 (performer)
- 1916: The Show of Wonders (composer)
- 1917: Doing Our Bit (composer, performer)
- 1917: Over the Top (additional numbers)
- 1920: Tick-Tack-Toe (producer, director, book, composer, lyricist)
- 1921: Passing Show of 1921 (actor)
- 1922: Herman Timberg's Follies (producer)
- 1924: Schemers (producer)
- 1942: You'll See Stars (director, composer, lyricist)
