= The Code of Conduct and the Vietnam Prisoners of War =

The Code of Conduct and the Vietnam War is a report from an individual research project conducted by John McCain, Commander, United States Navy, at the National War College. It has a 44 pages and was released on April 8, 1974.

The purpose of this paper was to review the Code of Conduct in the perspective of the Vietnam prisoner of war experience and to make recommendations for changes to the code itself and to the training and indoctrination of the members of the Armed Forces in the Code of Conduct. Additionally, recommendations are presented for the education of the members of the Armed Forces and the U.S. public in order to minimize the use of POWS in the future as political hostages and propaganda vehicles.

The Vietnam War was the first test of the Code of Conduct. The majority of the American POWS were held captive longer than in any other war engaged in by Americans. The paper discusses the Code of Conduct, article by article, and assesses its value and viability as they related to the Vietnam War experience. The report compares conditions and treatment American POWs experienced in Vietnam, and how it affected their ability to live up to the code.

In the report Commander McCain writes that, "The American people have been inoculated with too many John Wayne movies and other examples of unbreakable will and super human strength. It has been amply proved that every man has a breaking point."

== Sources ==
- The Code of Conduct and the Vietnam War, by John S McCain, Commander United States Navy
- "The Code of Conduct and the Vietnam Prisoners of War", by John S. McCain, Commander USN, National War College, 1974-04-08 (New York Times location)
