= VA-163 (U.S. Navy) =

Attack Squadron 163
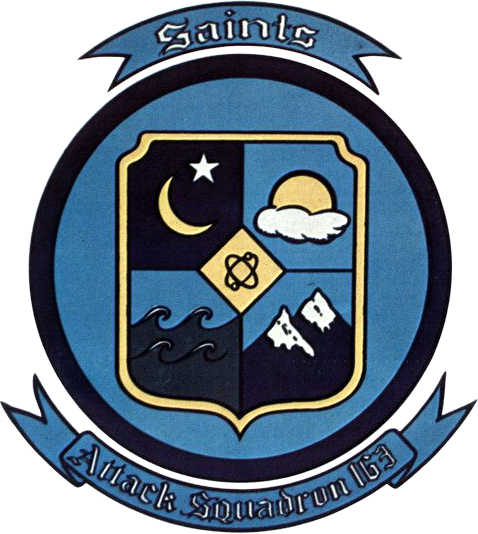
- VA-163 Insignia
- Active: 1 September 1960 – 1 July 1971
- Country: United States of America
- Branch: United States Navy
- Type: Attack Squadron
- Part of: Inactive
- Garrison/HQ: NAS Cecil Field
- Nickname: "Saints"
- Engagements: Vietnam War
- Decorations: Navy Unit Commendation x 4

Aircraft flown
- Attack: A-4 Skyhawk

Attack Squadron 163 (VA-163) Saints was an aviation unit of the United States Navy. VA-163 flew the Douglas A-4 Skyhawk from 1960 to 1969.

== History ==
On 1 September 1960, Attack Squadron 163 was established at Naval Air Station Cecil Field, Florida. Shortly thereafter, the Saints moved to Naval Air Station Lemoore, California where they began training for their first deployment.

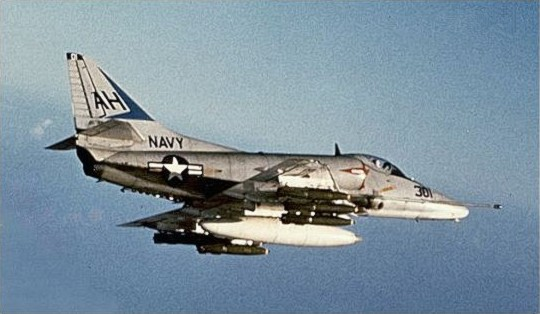
The A-4E of VA-163's CO, CDR W.F. Foster, in 1966.

During her operational history, Attack Squadron 163 made six Pacific Fleet cruises, including four combat cruises during the Vietnam War. The first five were with Carrier Air Wing 16 in USS Oriskany between 1962 and 1968, and the last with Carrier Air Wing 21 in USS Hancock in 1968–1969.

In the first three WESTPAC combat cruises to Southeast Asia (SEA) (1965–68), VA-163 sustained periods of heavy losses, including 14 aircraft destroyed by enemy action, with at least five pilots killed, five captured, and two severely wounded. The 'Saints' also lost two squadron Commanding Officers (CO) to combat action, with the first during the 1965 WESTPAC combat cruise, CDR Harry Jenkins, in November 1965 (shot down, and made a POW). The second was CDR Wynne Foster, who lost an arm to flak in July 1966, but ejected and was rescued. (Foster later recovered, and waged a successful battle to remain on active duty).

These unit losses were then followed by the tragic at-sea USS Oriskany fire, in October 1966, which then claimed more unit personnel (among the total 44 men who were lost in the fire).

Among the four total WESTPAC combat cruises that VA-163 completed, the 1967-68 cruise was by far the costliest, in losses of both pilots and aircraft. During this cruise alone, five 'Saints' pilots were Killed In Action, or went Missing In Action, over North Vietnam. (As of mid-2009, of these five lost men, the remains of three have been found and recovered from their loss sites in Vietnam, and identified using DNA analysis. The remaining two men have not yet been accounted for.)

A total of 12 A-4E aircraft were lost during the 1967-68 WESTPAC alone, with ten lost to enemy action, and two as operational losses.

Two notable VA-163 'Saints' pilots who became POWs were then-Commander James B. Stockdale, Commander Air Group of Attack Carrier Air Wing 16 (CVW-16) in 1965 (who as 'CAG', was never actually a VA-163 member, but he was flying a VA-163 A-4E at the time of his loss), and then-Lieutenant Commander John S. McCain, III in 1967.

Amidst the intense air combat of the early war period and the subsequent losses, the 'Saints' continued to display outstanding courage and bravery, resulting in many awards for valor being issued to many 'Saints' pilots. Among them, three 'Saints' were awarded the Navy Cross for extraordinary combat heroism: Commander Bryan Compton (then squadron CO), and Lieutenant Commanders James Busey and Marvin Reynolds. (Not surprisingly, these three awards were earned during the infamous 1967-68 WESTPAC, with the first two mentioned awards earned during the same mission (a 'Walleye' missile strike on the Hanoi Thermal Power Plant in August 1967).

On 1 April 1969 VA-163 was placed on inactive status, and two years later the squadron officially disestablished on 1 July 1971.

== Deployments ==
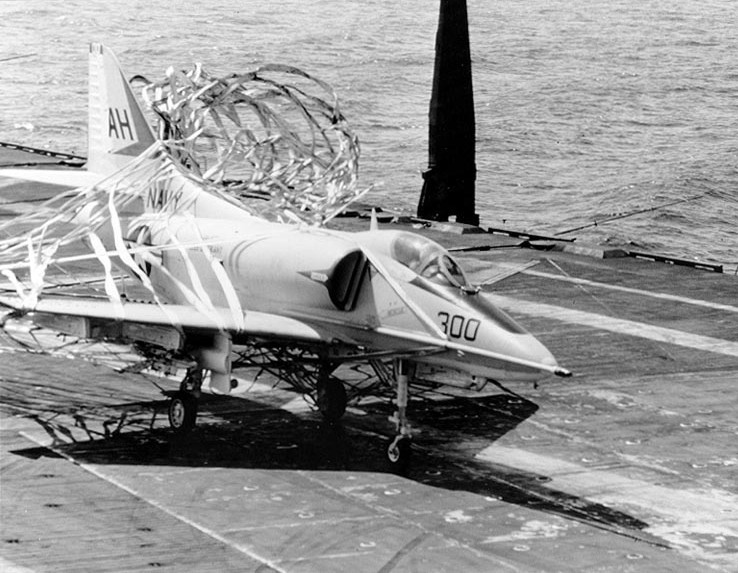
U.S. Navy pilot Lieutenant (Junior Grade) Denny Earl of Attack Squadron 163 (VA-163) "Saints", with both legs shattered by North Vietnamese anti-aircraft fire, successfully lands his Douglas A-4E Skyhawk (BuNo 152003) aboard the aircraft carrier USS Oriskany (CVA-34) in the Gulf of Tonkin, 20 November 1967. VA-163 was assigned to Carrier Air Wing 16 (CVW-16) aboard the Oriskany for a deployment to the Western Pacific and Vietnam from 16 June 1967 to 31 January 1968..

| from | to | aircraft | carrier | air wing | tail code | area |
|---|---|---|---|---|---|---|
| 7 June 1962 | 17 December 1962 | A4D-2 | CVA-34 | CVG-16 | AH-3xx | WestPac |
| 1 August 1963 | 10 March 1964 | A-4B | CVA-34 | CVW-16 | AH-3xx | WestPac |
| 5 April 1965 | 16 December 1965 | A-4E | CVA-34 | CVW-16 | AH-3xx | Vietnam War |
| 26 May 1966 | 16 November 1966 | A-4E | CVA-34 | CVW-16 | AH-3xx | Vietnam War |
| 16 June 1967 | 31 January 1968 | A-4E | CVA-34 | CVW-16 | AH-3xx | Vietnam War |
| 18 July 1968 | 3 March 1969 | A-4E | CVA-19 | CVW-21 | NP-3xx | Vietnam War |

== Notable former members ==
- John McCain
- James Stockdale
- Denny Earl

== See also ==
- History of the United States Navy.
- List of United States Navy aircraft squadrons.
