= Robert Timberg =

American journalist (1940–2016)

Bob Timberg
- Born: June 16, 1940; Miami, Florida, U.S.
- Died: September 6, 2016 (aged 76); Annapolis, Maryland, U.S.
- Education: United States Naval Academy; Stanford University
- Occupations: Journalist, author, and editor
- Spouse(s): Jane Timberg, Kelley Andrews
- Children: 4
- Parent(s): Sammy Timberg, Rosemarie Sinnott
- Awards: Aldo Beckman Memorial Award, 1986

Robert Richard "Bob" Timberg (June 16, 1940 – September 6, 2016) was an American journalist, writer, and author of four books, including The Nightingale's Song.

Timberg was raised in the New York City area. His father was musician and composer Sammy Timberg. He received his college education at the United States Naval Academy and his journalism degree at Stanford University. He served with the United States Marine Corps in South Vietnam from March 1966 to February 1967. He worked for many years as a reporter for The Evening Sun and The Baltimore Sun. He is also the author of John McCain: An American Odyssey and State of Grace: A Memoir of Twilight Time, a book about his experiences with sandlot football and growing up.

Robert Timberg, who was disfigured by a land mine as a Marine in Vietnam, went on to become a successful journalist. His memoir Blue Eyed Boy charts his struggle to recover from his wounds.

Timberg had four children: Scott, Craig, Amanda and Sam. he died in 2016 in Maryland at 76.

== Author ==
External videos
- Booknotes interview with Timberg on The Nightingale's Song, August 27, 1995, C-SPAN
- Presentation by Timberg on State of Grace, November 19, 2004, C-SPAN
- Q&A interview with Timberg on Blue-Eyed Boy, October 12, 2014, C-SPAN

Alongside his successful career as a journalist and editor, Timberg authored four books.

- The Nightingale's Song (1995) ISBN 0684803011
- John McCain: An American Odyssey (1999) ISBN 141655985X
- State of Grace: A Memoir of Twilight Time (2005) ISBN 0684855623
- Blue-Eyed Boy: A Memoir (2014) ISBN 1594205663
