= White House visitor logs =

White House visitor logs, also known as the White House Worker and Visitor Entry System (WAVES), are the guestbook records of individuals visiting the White House to meet with the president of the United States or other White House officials.

== History ==
The release of some logs to the public has been a goal of and can be credited to the pressure from watchdog groups concerned with the possible undue influence of lobbyists over the US government. Groups such as Judicial Watch, CREW, and The National Security Archive have been suing the government to release such logs under the Freedom of Information Act since at least the early 2000s. The Clinton and Bush administrations refused to release visitor records to the public, arguing they are part of presidential communications and not public records. The Obama administration, however, after initially following the same policy, eventually reversed it and by mid-2009 released the visitor logs as part of its stated commitment to government transparency, under the White House Voluntary Disclosure Policy. It was the first US administration to release those logs to the public. The logs were nonetheless redacted to remove sensitive meetings (such as visits by potential Supreme Court nominees) and purely personal guests. Logs for the period between January 20 and September 15, 2009, are subject to different policy and require specific requests.

The Trump administration withdrew its support for the release of the logs and is not making visitor logs available to the public, though some comments suggest the records could be made available "five years after Trump leaves office". This has led to several groups suing the government again, demanding the release of such logs, which should be seen as a matter of public record.

The Biden administration has stated that it will return to the policy of publicly releasing White House visitor logs while subsequently noting that the number of visitors would be comparatively lower due to the ongoing COVID-19 pandemic in the United States.

The second Trump administration said it would not release White House visitor logs.

== Analysis ==
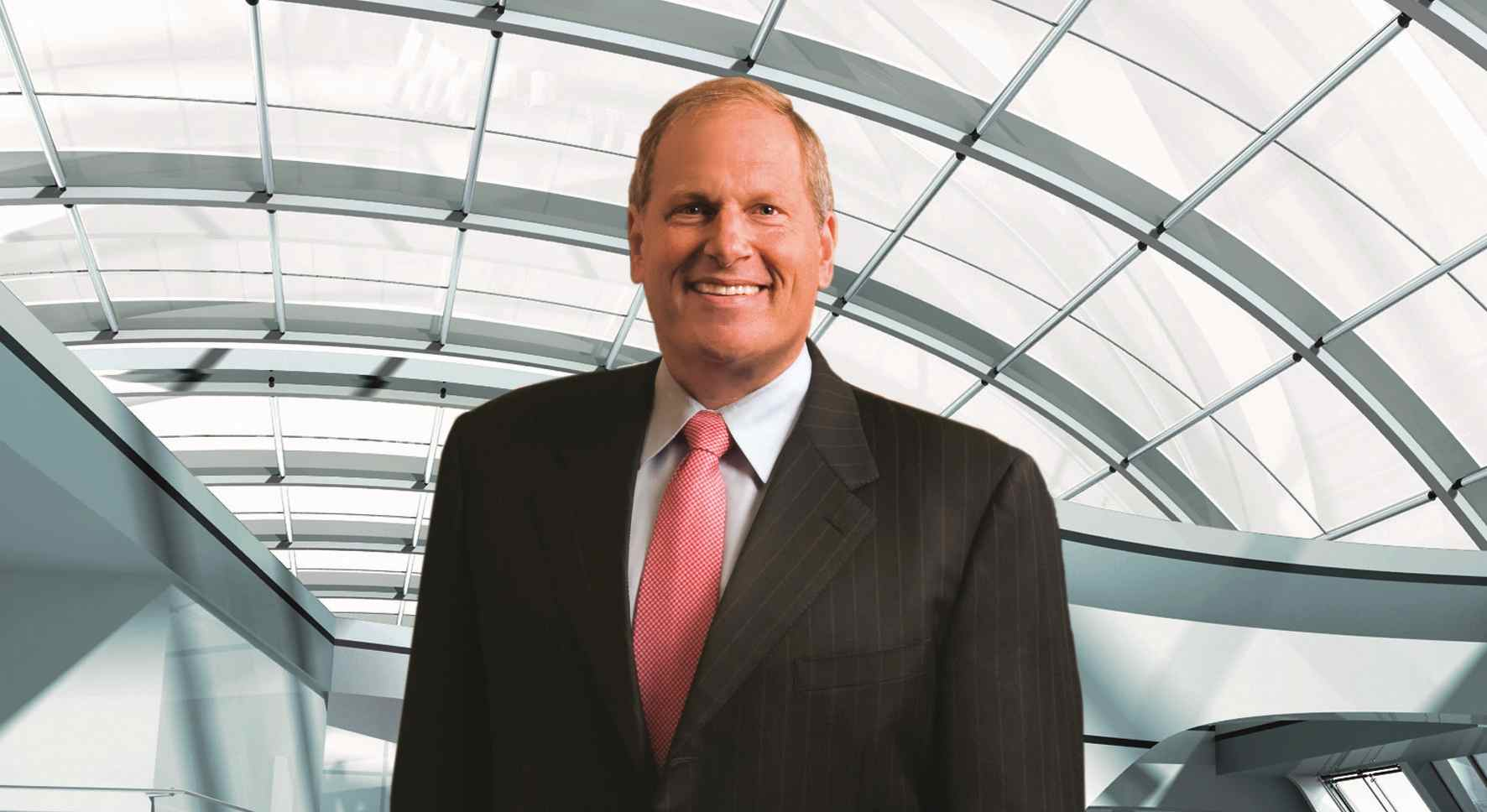
David M. Cote (Chairman and CEO of Honeywell International) was the most frequent business visitor to the White House during the Obama administration.

While Obama's release of the logs was generally praised by transparency activists, the Sunlight Foundation noted, "The voluntary system can be too easily circumvented. Because it only captures visitors to the White House, if an administration official wishes to keep a meeting with a lobbyist secret, he or she merely has to schedule it at a nearby location" and "Phone calls are also used to avoid disclosure". Omission of significant visits was criticized by other groups. Time noted that "The Obama-era process allowed the White House Counsel's office to unilaterally redact records of those visiting the complex for any reason. The Obama Administration, for instance, took a wide-ranging view of what were considered personal events hosted by the Obamas, leaving off celebrity sightings and meetings with top donors." The visitors could request their records be shielded from the public through a simple checkbox on the visitor form.

A 2017 study showed that companies whose executives have met the president report a rise in their share values by approximately 0.5% following a month or two after the disclosure of the meeting. The authors note that direct causation is difficult to prove. Still, investors likely view such news as indicating that companies will perform better, for example, winning more government procurement contracts. That study identified 2,286 meetings between corporate executives and federal government officials with the top three most frequent visitors for that period being David M. Cote (Chairman and CEO of Honeywell International, 30 visits), Jeffrey R. Immelt (Executive Chairman and CEO of General Electric, 22 visits) and Roger C. Altman (Executive Chairman of EverCore Partners, 21 visits). The top three most frequent visitees by corporate executives in that period were Valerie Jarrett (Senior Advisor to the President, 107 visits), Jeff Zients (Assistant to the President for Economic Policy and Director of the National Economic Council, 103 visits), and the President himself (100 visits).

== See also ==
- White House Visitors Office
- White House Records Office
