= US House and Senate career of John McCain (until 2000) =

John Sidney McCain III retired from the United States Navy in April 1981. His last four years in the service had been spent as the Navy's liaison to the United States Senate. He moved to Arizona with his new wife and, aided by a job from his father-in-law and the contacts it gave him, soon began a new career in politics.

In 1982, he was elected as a Republican to the U.S. House of Representatives from Arizona's 1st congressional district. After serving two terms there and making an impression as a rising political figure, he was elected U.S. Senator from Arizona in 1986. He became one of the senators entangled in the Keating Five scandal of the late 1980s, but survived it and was re-elected in 1992 and 1998.

While generally adhering to American conservatism, McCain established a reputation as a political maverick for his willingness to defy Republican orthodoxy on several issues. In reaction to his Keating Five experience, he made campaign finance reform one of his signature concerns. He was also a leader in normalizing diplomatic relations with Vietnam. His national visibility as a senator gave him the basis to begin a campaign for the 2000 Republican nomination for President of the United States.

== Entry into politics and 1982 House campaign ==
Having moved to Phoenix in March 1981, McCain went to work for Hensley & Co., his new father-in-law Jim Hensley's large Anheuser-Busch beer distributorship, as Vice President of Public Relations. McCain had little interest in the beer business itself, instead preferring to talk to colleagues about current events. In carrying out his job, he was able to gain political support among the local business community, meeting powerful figures such as banker Charles Keating Jr., real estate developer Fife Symington III, newspaper publisher Darrow "Duke" Tully, and locally-well-known auto dealer Lou Grubb, all the while looking for an electoral opportunity.

McCain's original plan was to run for a new U.S. House of Representatives seat from Arizona, created by reapportionment following the 1980 census, but that was too distant from Phoenix. Then John Jacob Rhodes Jr., the longtime Republican congressman from Arizona's 1st congressional district, announced his retirement in January 1982 after 30 years in Congress. This seat encompassed the East Valley portion of the Phoenix metropolitan area. The district was heavily Republican. It was very close to where the McCains lived; his wife Cindy McCain bought a house in the district the same day as Rhodes' announcement. Rhodes suggested that McCain first run for the Arizona Legislature to gain more experience, but McCain had no interest in slowly working his way up.

McCain ran for the seat as a Republican, and formally announced his candidacy in late March 1982. He faced three candidates in the Republican nomination process, all of whom had entered the race before him: State Senator Jim Mack, State Representative Donna Carlson-West, and veterinarian and active civic figure Ray Russell. The others were all given a good chance to win the primary election; McCain ranked at best third in early polls.

During the spring and the 110 °F heat of the Phoenix summer, McCain and his wife campaigned door-to-door six hours a day, six days a week. The exhausting schedule combined with his hair color led to him being nicknamed "The White Tornado". He was assisted by George "Bud" Day, his former POW cellmate, and Day's wife, who were familiar with legal and procedural matters. His supporters were dubbed "McCain's navy", and he stressed his familiarity with "the ways of Washington" and how his role as Navy Senate liaison had helped bring a defense contract to the district. Still, as a newcomer to the state, McCain was hit with repeated charges of being a carpetbagger. Finally, at a candidates forum, he gave a famous refutation to a voter making the charge:

Listen, pal. I spent 22 years in the Navy. My father was in the Navy. My grandfather was in the Navy. We in the military service tend to move a lot. We have to live in all parts of the country, all parts of the world. I wish I could have had the luxury, like you, of growing up and living and spending my entire life in a nice place like the First District of Arizona, but I was doing other things. As a matter of fact, when I think about it now, the place I lived longest in my life was Hanoi.

Phoenix Gazette columnist John Kolbe would later label this "the most devastating response to a potentially troublesome political issue I've ever heard."

McCain's campaign fell into early debt; his wife began loaning him tens of thousands of dollars to keep it alive. Donations also came in from Jim Hensley and other Hensley & Co. executives, but the amounts grew large enough that the Federal Election Commission forced return of some of it. By the close of the primary, McCain would outspend his opponents; more than half of his primary expenditures were financed by the eventual $167,000 that his wife lent to the campaign. (The McCains had made a prenuptial agreement that kept most of her family's assets under her name; they would always keep their finances separate and file individual income tax returns. In the end, $93,000 of the 1982 loan was forgiven.) The spending advantage made itself felt in television advertising, including a highly effective two-minute mini-documentary that presented him as a new leader for Arizona with a record of service to the country. Rival Mack later called that ad the best political commercial he had ever seen.

McCain was endorsed by Senator John Tower, a friend and mentor from his liaison stint who in turn got McCain the endorsement of former Arizona Governor and Senator Paul Fannin. Arizona Senator Barry Goldwater, the state's most powerful political figure, was officially neutral in the race, but many of his aides were working for McCain's opponents. Goldwater himself was said to view McCain as a political opportunist, despite admiring his military service. Late in the race, Goldwater made a public statement that was thought critical of McCain, but Tower persuaded Goldwater to avoid public confirmation of it to reporters and limit any damage. McCain benefited from the support of Duke Tully's The Arizona Republic, the state's most powerful newspaper.

McCain won the highly contested primary election on September 7, 1982, getting 32 percent of the vote compared to Russell's 26 percent, Mack's 22 percent, and Carlson-West's 20 percent. Two months later, he would win the general election in the heavily Republican district, defeating Democrat William E. "Bill" Hegarty by a 66 percent to 31 percent margin.

== U.S. Congressman ==
=== House years ===
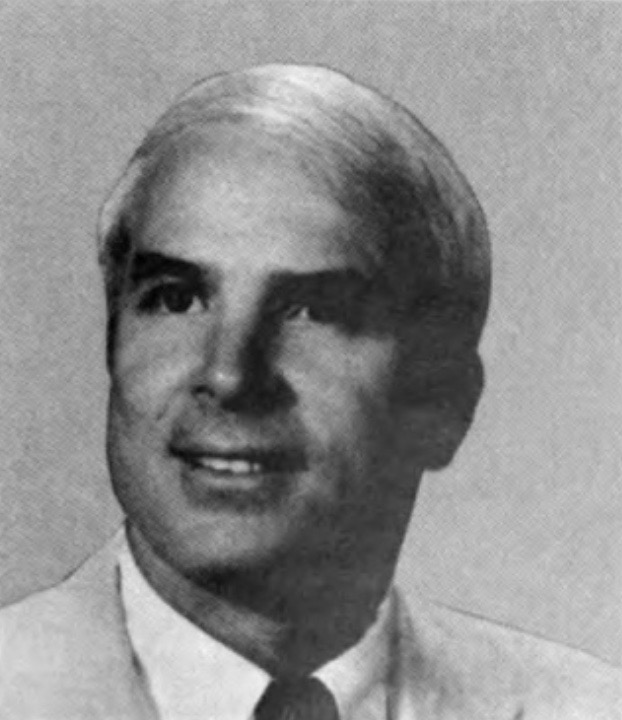
McCain in 1983, during his first term in the House

McCain made an immediate impression in Congress. His POW background, social skills, and contacts from his Navy Senate liaison job made him popular and a star among new House members. He was elected the president of the 1983 Republican freshman class of representatives. After strenuously lobbying the Republican leadership, he was assigned to the Committee on Interior Affairs. He coveted this assignment because he wanted to develop expertise on issues relevant to his state, including water rights, public land management, and Native American affairs. He was also assigned to the Select Committee on Aging, important due to Arizona's large retired population, and eventually to the chairmanship of the Republican Task Force on Indian Affairs. He fulfilled a campaign pledge to return to his congressional district every weekend, making 47 such trips in his first year. On them, he met frequently with constituents and make many public appearances. This, combined with his wife Cindy's decision to live in Arizona rather than move to Washington, helped solidify his political base in Arizona.

McCain sponsored a number of Indian affairs bills, dealing mainly with distribution of lands to reservations and tribal tax status; most of these bills were unsuccessful. In August 1983, he voted against a bill making Martin Luther King Jr. Day a federal holiday, saying it would be too expensive and that there were already enough federal holidays. The measure, which had failed four years earlier, now passed the House 338–90 and was signed into law later that year.

McCain's politics at this point were mainly in line with those of President Ronald Reagan, whom McCain would later describe as his greatest political influence: "I embraced all of the core Reagan convictions: faith in the individual; skepticism of government; free trade and vigorous capitalism; anticommunism; a strong defense; robust internationalism that championed our values abroad; and most important, his eloquently stated belief in America's national greatness ..." McCain supported Reaganomics. He was in favor of school prayer and opposed abortion. He subscribed to most aspects of the foreign policy of the Reagan administration, including its hardline stance against the Soviet Union. He supported the Reagan administration's policy towards Central American conflicts, including the invasion of Grenada in 1983 and U.S. support for the Contras in Nicaragua. During the early 1980s, he served on the board of the U.S. Council for World Freedom, a chapter of the World Anti-Communist League which was an international group that, among other things, aided the rebels in Nicaragua; McCain suspected the council of illegal activity and resigned in 1984.

McCain voted against a 1983 resolution allowing President Reagan to keep U.S. Marines deployed as part of the Multinational Force in Lebanon, on the grounds that he "[did] not foresee obtainable objectives in Lebanon." After the catastrophic Beirut barracks bombing a month later, this stance against his party and president gained him national media exposure and started his reputation as a political maverick. McCain sided with Newt Gingrich's group of young conservatives in some of their battles against the House Democratic leadership, but declined to join Gingrich's Conservative Opportunity Society. McCain felt personal affection for Democratic Speaker of the House Tip O'Neill, and established good relations with some Democrats in the House, such as Paul Simon and especially Mo Udall.

McCain won re-election to the House easily in 1984, facing no Republican primary opposition and defeating Democratic energy analyst Harry W. Braun with 78 percent of the vote to 22 percent in the general election. In this and subsequent Arizona campaigns, McCain rarely emphasized his Vietnam and prisoner of war experiences.

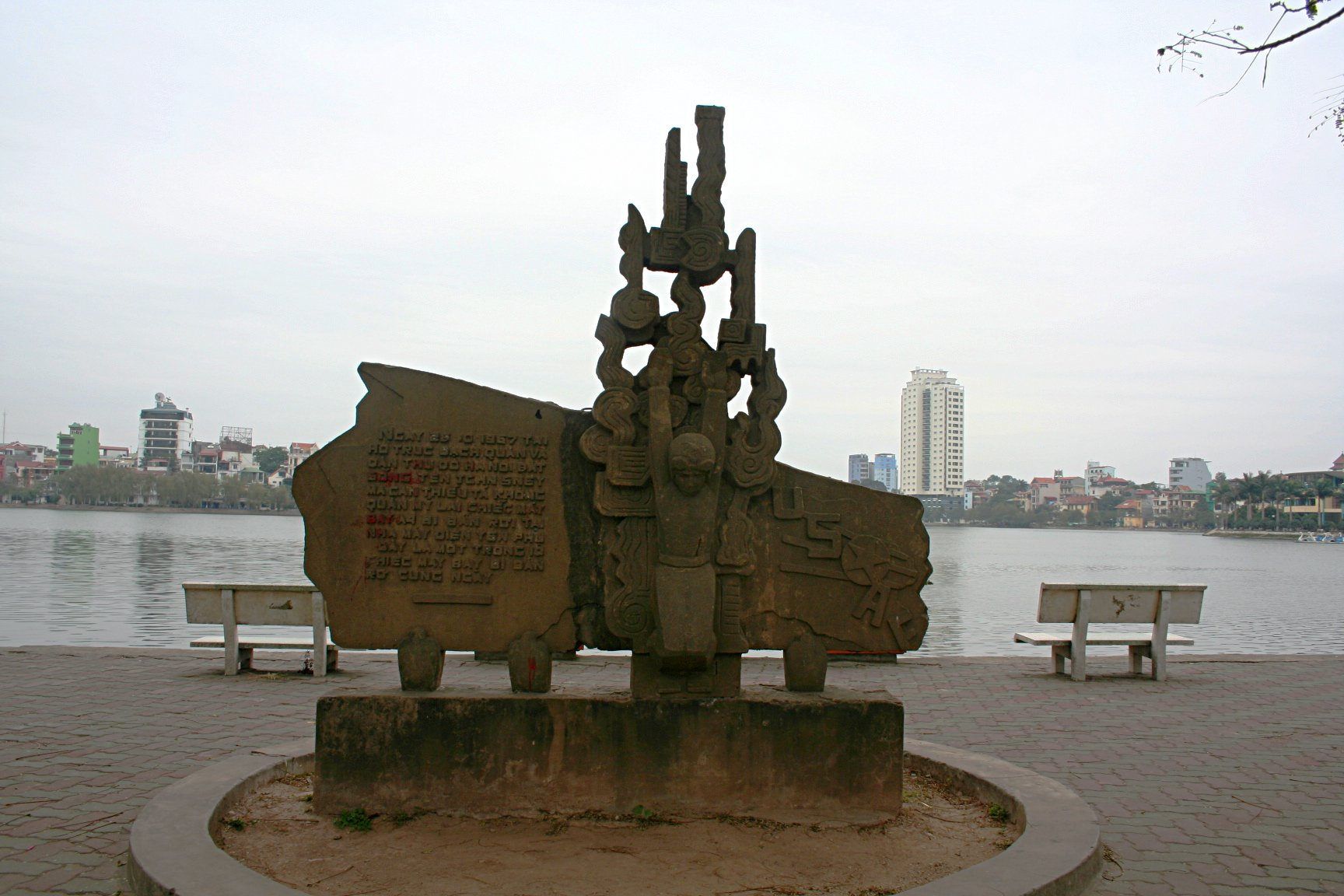
Trúc Bạch Lake has a monument to McCain's downing, which he saw on his return visit to Hanoi in 1985.

In the new term, McCain gained a spot on the House Foreign Affairs Committee in addition to his existing assignments. McCain got the Indian Economic Development Act of 1985 signed into law, and the following year worked on early attempts at legislation regarding Indian gaming. He took moderate stands on the environment and on social issues, and applauded Jack Kemp's concerns for African Americans and other underprivileged groups. In 1985 he returned to Vietnam with Walter Cronkite for a CBS News special, and saw the monument put up next to where the famous downed "air pirate Ma Can" had been pulled from the Hanoi lake; it was the first of several return trips McCain would make there. In 1986, McCain voted to override Reagan's veto of the Comprehensive Anti-Apartheid Act that imposed sanctions against South Africa.

In December 1985, McCain visited Chilean dictator Augusto Pinochet and junta member Admiral José Toribio Merino. McCain told the U.S. Embassy in Santiago that both meetings were friendly and warm, but described Pinochet as obsessed with the dangers of communism and likened him to the John Birch Society. Merino's statement to McCain that the junta would not support a Pinochet bid to remain president was made publicly known (but McCain's meeting with Pinochet was not declassified until 2008, upon which it was widely reported in the Latin American mainstream press). McCain did not visit opposition leaders during the 1985 trip, as the U.S. Ambassador had recently been doing. Both Pinochet and his ministers refused to meet in January 1986 with a U.S. Senator who visited opposition leaders. McCain later called upon the Chilean government to respect the upcoming Chilean national plebiscite of 1988.

=== More children ===
In 1984 McCain and his wife Cindy had their first child together, daughter Meghan. She was followed in 1986 by son John Sidney IV (known as Jack), and in 1988 by son James. In 1991, Cindy McCain brought an abandoned three-month-old girl, who badly needed medical treatment for a severe cleft palate, to the U.S. from a Bangladeshi orphanage run by Mother Teresa; the McCains decided to adopt her, and named her Bridget. A drawn-out adoption process began, slowed down by uncertainty over the exact fate of the girl's father, but in 1993 the adoption was ruled final. McCain then stood by his wife when she disclosed in 1994 a previous addiction to painkillers and said that she hoped the publicity would give other drug addicts courage in their struggles. Beginning in the early 1990s, McCain began attending the 6,000-member North Phoenix Baptist Church in Arizona, part of the Southern Baptist Convention, later saying "[I found] the message and fundamental nature more fulfilling than I did in the Episcopal church. ... They're great believers in redemption, and so am I." Nevertheless, he still identified himself as Episcopalian, and while Cindy and two of their children were baptized into the Baptist church, he was not.

=== 1986 Senate campaign ===
McCain decided to run for United States Senator from Arizona in 1986, when longtime senator, American conservative icon, 1964 Republican presidential nominee, and Arizona native Barry Goldwater retired after 30 years in the Senate. No Republican would oppose McCain in the primary, and according to his press secretary Torie Clarke, McCain's political strength convinced his most formidable possible Democratic opponent, Governor Bruce Babbitt, not to run for the seat. Instead McCain faced a weaker opponent, former state legislator Richard Kimball, a young politician with an offbeat personality who slept on his office floor and whom McCain's allies in the Arizona press characterized as having "terminal weirdness." McCain's associations with Duke Tully, who by now had been disgraced for having concocted a fictitious military record, as well as revelations of father-in-law Jim Hensley's past brushes with the law, became campaign issues.

In the end, McCain won the election easily with 60 percent of the vote to Kimball's 40 percent. A New York Times profile at the time said that McCain seemed "poised to emerge as a significant figure in national politics". At the same time, McCain's increasing involvement in Arizona state party politics caused resentment on the part of some other Republicans. This led to McCain falling out with Congressman Bob Stump and powerful state legislator Jane Hull.

== U.S. Senator ==
=== Senate career starts ===
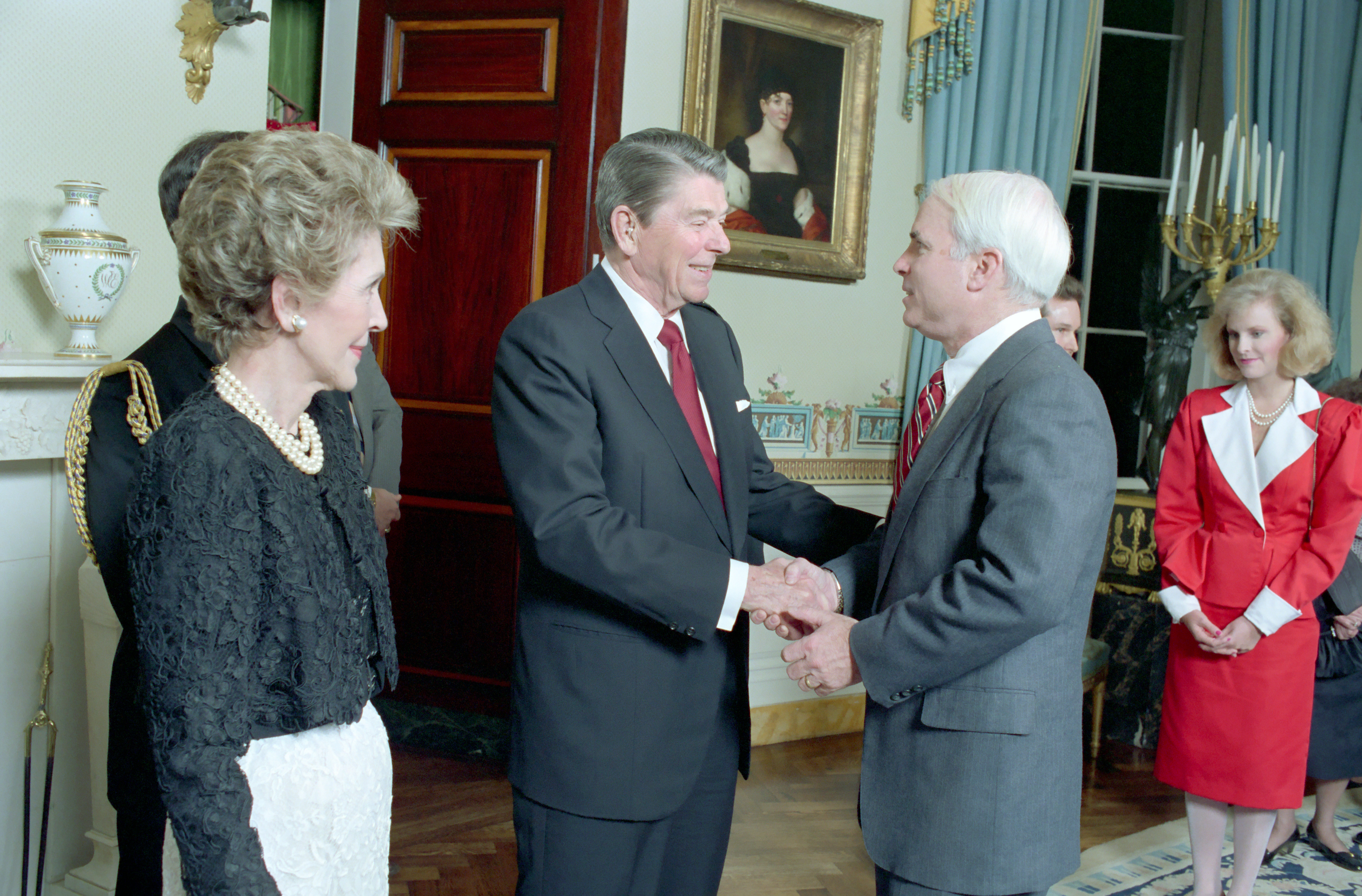
Newly elected Senator McCain met President Ronald Reagan and First Lady Nancy Reagan in March 1987.

Upon entering the Senate in 1987, McCain kept a low profile. He became a member of the Senate Armed Services Committee, with which he had formerly done his Navy liaison work; he was also given positions on the Commerce Committee and the Indian Affairs Committee. For his first two years in the Senate, he sat at the Candy desk.

McCain was a strong supporter of the Gramm-Rudman legislation that enforced automatic spending cuts in the case of budget deficits. He voted in favor of Reagan's failed 1987 nomination of Robert Bork to the U.S. Supreme Court.

McCain often supported the Native American agenda, advocating economic development and self-governance, as well as sovereignty and tribe control of adoptions. "Never deceived them," McCain once said, "They have been deceived too many times in the last 200 years." Along with Senator Daniel Inouye and Representative Mo Udall, McCain was one of the main drafters of the 1988 Indian Gaming Regulatory Act, which codified rules regarding Native American gambling enterprises and established the balance between Indian tribal sovereignty and regulatory oversight by the states of such activity. After its passage, McCain stated his personal opposition to Indian gaming, but said that when communities under poverty "are faced with only one option for economic development, and that is to set up gambling on their reservations, then I cannot disapprove." The Act enabled the growth of what would become, two decades later, the $23 billion Indian gaming industry, and one scholar has referred to McCain as "one of the founding fathers of Indian gaming."

Martin Luther King Jr. Day had become a big issue in McCain's home state, with Governor Evan Mecham making opposition to it his signature stance. McCain had continued his opposition to the holiday by supporting Mecham's rescinding of the Arizona holiday for King in 1987. In 1988, Mecham was impeached and removed from office due to felony charges. McCain told Mecham, "You should never have been elected. You're an embarrassment to the party." By 1989, McCain reiterated his opposition to the federal holiday, but reversed position on the state holiday, due to the economic boycotts and image problems Arizona was receiving as a result of it not having one. He told Republicans opposing the state holiday, "You will damn well do this. You will make this a holiday. You're making us look like fools." In 1990, a state referendum on enacting the holiday was held; McCain persuaded Ronald Reagan to support it. However, Mecham led an effort that year that defeated the referendum.

During the late 1980s, McCain gained some national visibility. He delivered a speech, about a fellow Hanoi Hilton prisoner's persistence in making an American flag despite beatings, that drew audience tears and a standing ovation at the 1988 Republican National Convention. He was mentioned by the press as being on the short list for Republican nominee George H. W. Bush's vice-presidential running mate, and was named chairman of Veterans for Bush. In 1989, he became a staunch defender of his friend John Tower's doomed nomination for U.S. Secretary of Defense; McCain butted heads with Moral Majority co-founder Paul Weyrich, who was challenging Tower regarding alleged heavy drinking and extramarital affairs. Thus began McCain's difficult relationship with the Christian right; he would later write that Weyrich was "a pompous self-serving son of a bitch."

McCain supported the United States invasion of Panama in 1989. McCain partnered with Senator Al Gore on the 1989 Missile and Proliferation Control Act, which established sanctions on companies and nations that engaged in the trade or development of long-range missile systems, and the 1992 Iran-Iraq Arms Nonproliferation Act (commonly known as the Gore-McCain Act), which established penalties for persons and companies assisting Iraq or Iran in acquiring missile technology.

=== Keating Five scandal ===
John McCain's upward political trajectory was jolted when he became enmeshed in the Keating Five scandal, a highly visible part of the Savings and Loan crisis of the 1980s. Charles Keating Jr.'s Lincoln Savings and Loan Association, a subsidiary of his American Continental Corporation, was insolvent as a result of some bad loans. In order to overcome its debt, Lincoln violated "direct investment" rules by directing accounts by the Federal Deposit Insurance Corporation into commercial real estate ventures. This caught the eye of federal regulators, who were looking to shut Lincoln down. Keating contacted five senators to whom he made contributions, looking for them to intervene with the regulators on his behalf.

McCain and Keating had become personal friends following their initial contacts in 1981. Between 1982 and 1987, McCain had received $112,000 in lawful political contributions from Keating and his associates. In addition, McCain's wife Cindy and her father Jim Hensley had invested $359,100 in a Keating shopping center in April 1986, a year before McCain met with the regulators. McCain, his family, and their baby-sitter had made nine trips at Keating's expense, sometimes aboard the American Continental jet.

By March 1987, Keating was asking McCain to travel to meet with regulators regarding Lincoln Savings; McCain refused. Keating called McCain a "wimp" behind his back, and on March 24 the two had a heated, contentious meeting. On April 2 and April 9, 1987, McCain and the other senators met at the Capitol with regulators, first with Edwin J. Gray, chairman of the Federal Home Loan Bank Board, and then members of the FHLBB San Francisco branch, to discuss the government's investigation of Lincoln. McCain would write in 2002 that attending the two meetings was "the worst mistake of my life".

News of the meetings first appeared in National Thrift News in September 1987, but was only sporadically covered by the general media through April 1989. Towards the end of that period, after learning Keating was in trouble over Lincoln, McCain paid a total of $13,433 for his air trips.

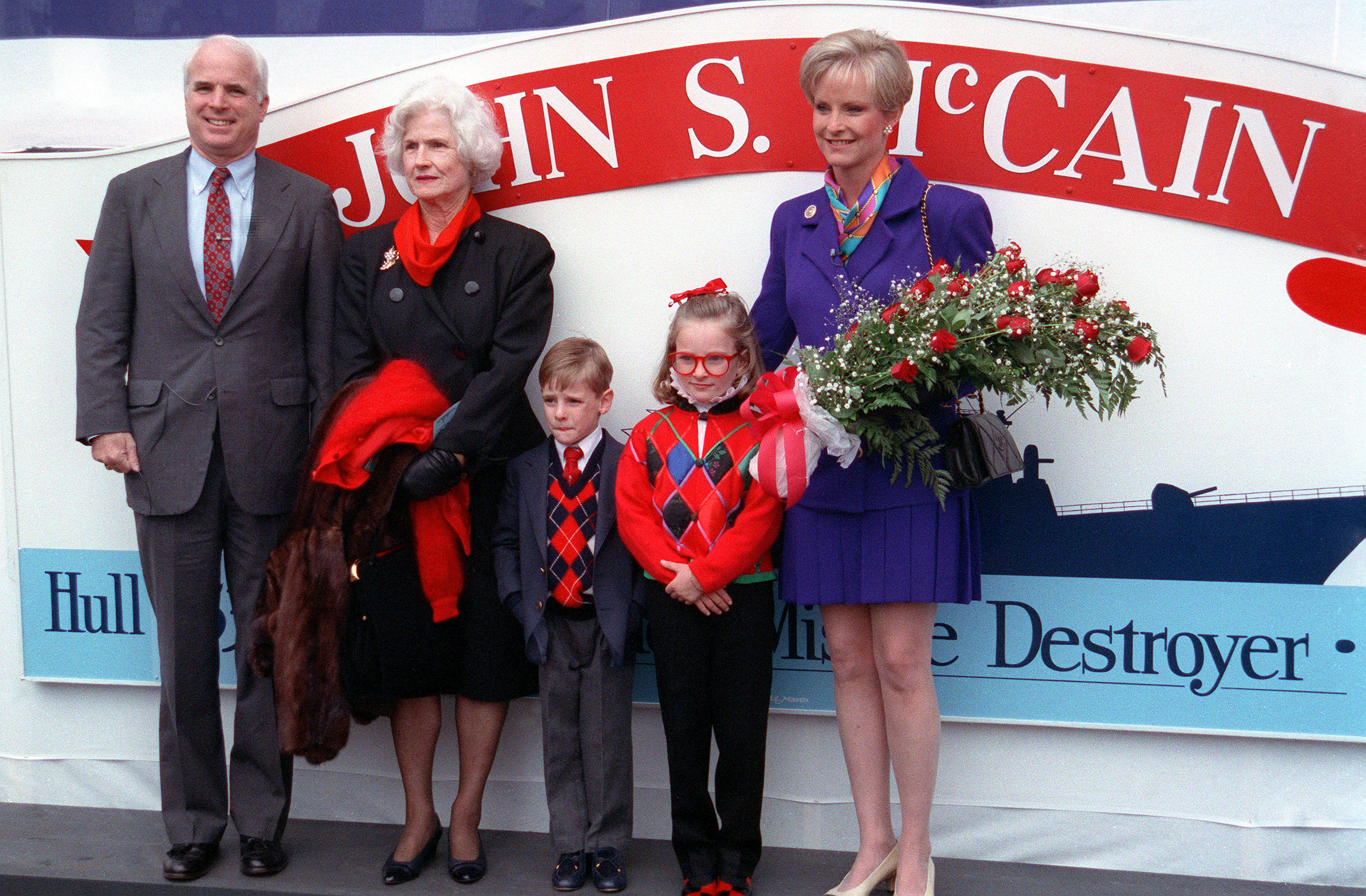
McCain and some of his family attended the September 1992 christening of USS John S. McCain at Bath Iron Works in Maine. The photograph taken at the time shows, left to right, John McCain, his mother Roberta McCain, his son Jack, his daughter Meghan (the ship's maid of honor), and his wife Cindy McCain (the ship's sponsor).

The regulators backed off Keating, and Lincoln stayed in business. Still desperate for cash, it convinced customers to replace their federally-insured certificates of deposit with higher-yielding junk bond certificates of American Continental. In April 1989, Lincoln failed; about 23,000 customers were left with worthless bonds, and many elderly investors lost their life savings. Federal regulators filed a $1.1 billion civil racketeering and fraud suit against Keating. The five senators came under investigation for attempting to influence the regulators.

In the end, none of the senators were charged with any crime. Instead, the Senate Ethics Committee investigated them. Robert S. Bennett, who was the special investigator for the committee, wanted to drop any action against McCain and Senator John Glenn, on the grounds of insufficient evidence, but the committee disagreed. After public hearings, McCain was mildly rebuked by the committee for exercising "poor judgment" in intervening with the federal regulators on Keating's behalf, but its 1991 report said that McCain's "actions were not improper nor attended with gross negligence and did not reach the level of requiring institutional action against him. ... Senator McCain has violated no law of the United States or specific Rule of the United States Senate." (In later years, several retrospective accounts of the controversy reiterated a contention that McCain was included in the investigation primarily so that there would be at least one Republican target.) On his Keating Five experience, McCain said: "The appearance of it was wrong. It's a wrong appearance when a group of senators appear in a meeting with a group of regulators, because it conveys the impression of undue and improper influence. And it was the wrong thing to do."

The Senate Ethics Committee did not pursue, for lack of jurisdiction, any possible ethics breaches in McCain's delayed reimbursements to Keating for trips at the latter's expense, because they occurred while McCain was in the House. The House Committee on Standards of Official Conduct said that it too lacked jurisdiction, because McCain was no longer in the House. It said it did not require that McCain amend his existing financial disclosure forms for his House years, on the grounds that McCain had now fully reimbursed Keating's company. McCain and his staff were suspected of having leaked to the press sensitive information about the investigation that came from some of the closed proceedings of the Ethics Committee. McCain denied doing so under oath, although several press reports, and later one of the investigators, concluded that McCain had been one of the main leakers during that time.

McCain survived the political scandal in part by becoming friendly with the political press. He held a lengthy press conference in which he answered all questions. With his blunt manner, he became a frequent guest on television newscasts and talk-oriented news shows, especially once the 1991 Gulf War – which he had voted in favor of – began and his military and POW experience came into demand. McCain began campaigning against lobbyist money in politics from then on.

McCain's 1992 re-election campaign found his opposition split between Democratic community and civil rights activist Claire Sargent and impeached and removed former Governor Evan Mecham running as an independent. Although Mecham garnered some hard-core conservative support, Sargent's campaign never gathered momentum and the Keating Five affair did not dominate discussion. Sargent, who had a failed race for the Arizona Legislature in her background, was slow getting her campaign underway and, although 1992 was the Year of the Woman in American politics, failed to get the endorsement of organizations such as Emily's List. McCain outspent Sargent, $3 million to $350,000.

McCain again won handily, getting 56 percent of the vote to Sargent's 32 percent and Mecham's 11 percent. McCain's victory put a final end to Mecham's political career. During the same election Arizona finally passed a referendum, which McCain supported, enabling the state Martin Luther King Jr. holiday.

=== Vietnam redux ===
McCain was a co-sponsor of the Agent Orange Act of 1991, which enabled disability benefits for Vietnam veterans afflicted with Agent Orange-related diseases and established periodic scientific reviews to determine what levels of exposure and diseases would be covered. In January 1993, McCain was named chairman of the board of directors of the International Republican Institute, a non-profit democracy-promotion organization with informal ties to the Republican party. The position would allow McCain to bolster his foreign policy expertise and credentials as well as his future fundraising prospects. At the same time, he was named head of recruiting and fund-raising for Republican senatorial candidates. Further in 1993, a melanoma was discovered on his shoulder and removed. In 1990, McCain voted to confirm David Souter as a Supreme Court justice, and in 1991, he supported the contentious but eventually successful nomination of Clarence Thomas. In 1993 and 1994, McCain voted to confirm President Clinton's nominees Ruth Bader Ginsburg and Stephen Breyer, whom he considered to be qualified for the Supreme Court despite differing judicial philosophies from his. He would later explain that "under our Constitution, it is the president's call to make."

McCain was a key member of the 1991–1993 Senate Select Committee on POW/MIA Affairs, chaired by Democrat and fellow Vietnam War veteran John Kerry, which was convened to investigate the Vietnam War POW/MIA issue: the fate of U.S. service personnel listed as missing in action during the Vietnam War. The committee's work included more visits to Vietnam and persuading the Department of Defense to declassify over a million pages of relevant documents. The committee's final report, which McCain endorsed, stated that, "While the Committee has some evidence suggesting the possibility a POW may have survived to the present, and while some information remains yet to be investigated, there is, at this time, no compelling evidence that proves that any American remains alive in captivity in Southeast Asia." After many years of disliking Kerry due to his actions with Vietnam Veterans Against the War, McCain developed "unbounded respect and admiration" for him during the hearings.

The actions of the committee were designed to allow for improved ties between the two countries, although that goal was not shared by a large segment of Republicans. McCain pressed for normalization of diplomatic relations with Vietnam, partly because it was "a time to heal ... it's a way of ending the war; it's time to move on," and partly because he saw it in the U.S. national interest to do so, in particular envisioning Vietnam as a valuable regional counterbalance against China. In 1994 the Senate passed a resolution, sponsored by Kerry and McCain, that called for an end to the existing trade embargo against Vietnam; it was intended to pave the way for normalization. During his time on the committee and afterward, McCain was vilified as a fraud, traitor, or "Manchurian Candidate" by some POW/MIA activists who believed that large numbers of American servicemen were still being held against their will in Southeast Asia. They were angry that McCain did not share their belief and that he sought to normalize relations with Vietnam. McCain's high-profile on the Vietnam issue also cost him the friendship of some fellow former POWs; McCain and 1992 independent presidential candidate Ross Perot, who had helped McCain's wife Carol during her husband's captivity, also had a falling out over the POW/MIA issue, which then extended to Perot blasting McCain's remarriage to Cindy McCain. In return, McCain attacked those he saw as profiteers exploiting the families of those missing in action.

In response to the criticism of the committee's findings, McCain said that he and Kerry had convinced the Vietnamese to give them full access to their records, and that he had spent thousands of hours trying to find real, not fabricated, evidence of surviving Americans. McCain's push for normalization was opposed by some leading Senate Republicans, including Phil Gramm and Senate Majority Leader Bob Dole. In 1995, President Bill Clinton normalized diplomatic relations with Vietnam. McCain's and Kerry's visible support during the announcement gave Clinton, who came of age during Vietnam but did not serve in the military, some political cover.

These actions were of a piece with McCain's attitude towards domestic reconciliation from the Vietnam era; unlike many who went to Vietnam (some of whom were his best friends), he did not hold grudges against those who did not go. In 1993 he had offered to escort Clinton on a speaking visit to the Vietnam Veterans Memorial at a time when some veterans were angrily challenging Clinton's moral right to go there. He also struck up a friendship with an anti-war leader, David Ifshin, who had once traveled to Hanoi to make an anti-American propaganda broadcast that McCain had heard in his cell.

=== A maverick senator ===
Having survived the Keating Five scandal, McCain made attacking what he saw as the corrupting influence of big money on American politics his signature issue. Starting in late 1994 he worked with Democratic Wisconsin Senator Russ Feingold on campaign finance reform; their McCain–Feingold bill would attempt to put limits on "soft money", funds that corporations, unions, and other organizations could donate to political parties, which would then be funneled to political candidates in circumvention of "hard money" donation limits. From the start, McCain and Feingold's efforts were opposed by some of the interests targeted, by incumbents in both parties, by those who felt spending limits impinged on free political speech, and by those who wanted to lessen the power of what they saw as media bias. On the other hand, it garnered considerable sympathetic coverage in the national media, and from 1995 on, "maverick Republican" became a label frequently applied to McCain in stories. He had used the term himself, and one of the chapters in his 2002 memoir Worth the Fighting For would be titled "Maverick". The first version of the McCain–Feingold Act was introduced into the Senate in September 1995; it was filibustered in 1996 and never came to a vote.

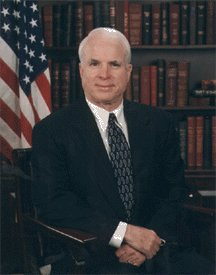
Senator McCain's official Senate photo from the 1990s

In 1993, McCain opposed military operations in Somalia, saying it was "an unfocused mission that lacks an objective"; after 18 American deaths in the Battle of Mogadishu, he introduced a resolution to bring U.S. forces home immediately, but it was defeated in the Senate. McCain similarly opposed Operation Uphold Democracy in Haiti in 1994. He was initially opposed to U.S. military involvement in the Bosnian War, voting against the George H. W. Bush administration on a 1992 resolution that would have authorized "demonstrations of force" in conjunction with the Operation Provide Promise humanitarian relief effort there. McCain's view changed after the 1995 Srebrenica Massacre, and he voted in favor of the resolution authorizing the 1995 NATO bombing in Bosnia and Herzegovina against the Bosnian Serb Army.

McCain attacked what he saw as pork barrel spending within Congress, believing that the practice did not contribute to the greater national interest. Towards this end he was instrumental in pushing through approval of the Line Item Veto Act of 1996, which gave the president the power to veto individual expenditures. Although this was one of McCain's biggest Senate victories, the effect was short-lived as the U.S. Supreme Court ruled the act unconstitutional in 1998. In a more symbolic attempt to limit congressional privilege, he introduced an amendment in 1994 to remove free VIP parking for members of Congress at D.C. area airports; his annoyed colleagues rejected the notion and accused McCain of grandstanding. He was the only Republican senator to vote against the Freedom to Farm Act in 1996, saying that it catered to special interests rather than representing true reform of farm subsidies policy. He was one of only five senators to vote against the Telecommunications Act of 1996, on the grounds that it put the economic interests of corporations ahead of those of consumers.

McCain became chairman of the Senate Indian Affairs Committee in 1995, and would hold that position into 1997. McCain's visibility was increased by the 1995 publication of Robert Timberg's well-received The Nightingale's Song, a joint biography of five graduates from the Naval Academy who had served in Vietnam and whose subsequent public fame and problems illuminated the role of Vietnam and the military in American life. At the start of the 1996 presidential election, McCain served as national campaign chairman for the highly unsuccessful Republican nomination effort of Texas Senator Phil Gramm. After Gramm dropped out, McCain endorsed eventual nominee Senate Majority Leader Bob Dole, and was again on the short list of possible vice-presidential picks. McCain formed a close bond with Dole, based in part on their shared near-death war experiences; he nominated Dole at the 1996 Republican National Convention and was a key friend and advisor to Dole throughout his ultimately losing general election campaign.

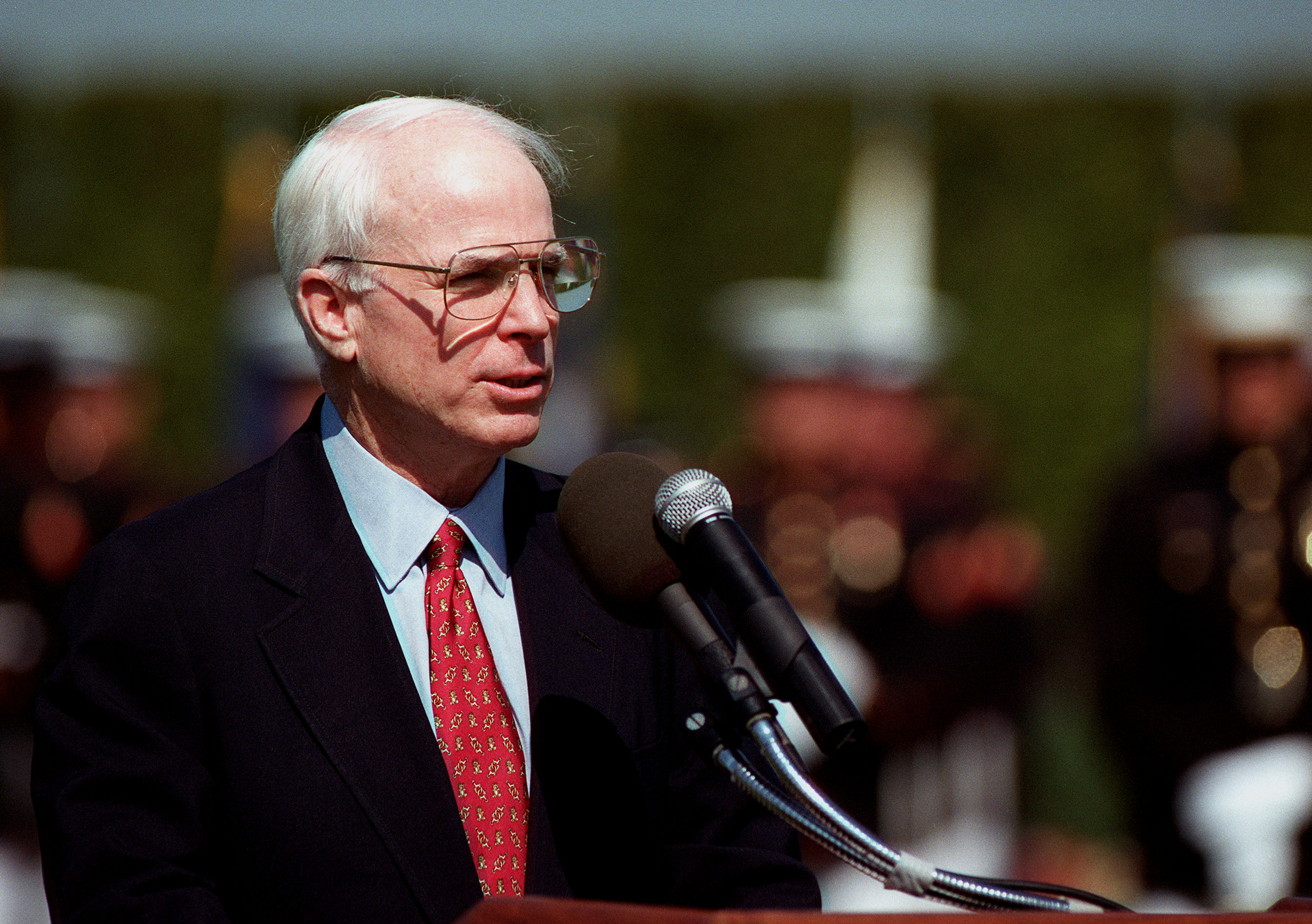
McCain at the Pentagon in 1997.

In 1997, McCain became chairman of the powerful Senate Commerce Committee; he was criticized for accepting funds from corporations and businesses under the committee's purview, but responded by saying that, "Literally every business in America falls under the Commerce Committee" and that he restricted those contributions to $1,000 and thus was not part of the big-money nature of the campaign finance problem. In that year, Time magazine named McCain as one of the "25 Most Influential People in America". McCain used his chairmanship to challenge the tobacco industry in 1998, proposing legislation that would increase cigarette taxes in order to fund anti-smoking campaigns and reduce the number of teenage smokers, increase research money on health studies, and help states pay for smoking-related health care costs. The industry spent some $40–50 million in national advertising in response; while McCain's bill had the support of the Clinton administration and many public health groups, most Republican senators opposed it, stating it would create an unwieldy new bureaucracy. The bill failed to gain cloture twice and was seen as a bad political defeat for McCain. During 1998 a revised version of the McCain–Feingold Act came up for Senate consideration; in addition to banning soft money, it sought to restrict "issue ads" run by independent groups within 60 days of an election. While having majority support, it was fiercely opposed by Senator Mitch McConnell on free speech and partisan threat grounds, and it again fell victim to a filibuster and failed to gain cloture.

McCain easily won re-election to a third senate term in November 1998, gaining 69 percent of the vote to 27 percent for his Democratic opponent, environmental lawyer Ed Ranger. Ranger was a motorcycle enthusiast whose Harley-Davidson was painted as the flag of Arizona and a political novice who had only recently returned from four years of working and living in Mexico. McCain carried Democratic stronghold Apache County by 54–42 percent and won Hispanic votes statewide by 52–42 percent. McCain took no "soft money" during the campaign, but still raised $4.4 million for his bid, saying that he had needed it in case the tobacco companies or other Washington special interests mounted a strong effort against him. One of Ranger's campaigning points had been that McCain was really more interested in running for president; McCain indeed created a presidential exploratory committee the following month.

McCain had been uncomfortable and largely silent during the 1998 Lewinsky scandal, partly because his own personal life had not been without blemishes, and partly because his upcoming presidential nomination run restricted his political options. During the early 1999 Impeachment of Bill Clinton, McCain voted to convict the president on both the perjury and obstruction of justice counts. In his remarks on the Senate floor, McCain said: "Although I may admit to failures in my private life, I have [always] kept faith with every oath I have ever sworn to this country. I have known some men who kept that faith at the cost of their lives. I cannot – not in deference to public opinion, or for political considerations, or for the sake of comity and friendship – I cannot agree to expect less from the President."

During 1999, the McCain–Feingold Act once again came up for consideration, this time with soft money prohibition features in but the issue ads provision out. McConnell challenged McCain to name specific senators who had been corrupted by existing campaign finance practices, but McCain refused. In the end, the same failure to gain cloture befell the legislation again. During that year, McCain shared the Profile in Courage Award with Feingold for their work in trying to enact this campaign finance reform; McCain was cited for opposing his own party on the bill at a time when he was trying to win the party's presidential nomination. Indeed, by April 1999 aspects of McCain's 2000 presidential campaign were underway, and his stance regarding the Kosovo War and other issues would take place in that context.

== Election results ==
Arizona's 1st congressional district: Results 1982–1984
Year	Democrat	Votes	Pct	Republican	Votes	Pct	3rd Party	Party	Votes	Pct
1982	William E. Hegarty	41,261	31%	John McCain	89,116	66%	Richard K. Dodge	Libertarian	4,850	4%
1984	Harry W. Braun	45,609	22%	John McCain	162,418	78%				

U.S. Senate elections in Arizona (Class III): Results 1986–1998
Year	Democrat	Votes	Pct	Republican	Votes	Pct	3rd Party	Party	Votes	Pct	3rd Party	Party	Votes	Pct	3rd Party	Party	Votes	Pct
1986	Richard Kimball	340,965	40%	John McCain	521,850	60%												
1992	Claire Sargent	436,321	32%	John McCain	771,395	56%	Evan Mecham	Independent	145,361	11%	Kiana Delamare	Libertarian	22,613	2%	Ed Finkelstein	New Alliance	6,335	<1%
1998	Ed Ranger	275,224	27%	John McCain	696,577	69%	John C. Zajac	Libertarian	23,004	2%	Bob Park	Reform	18,288	2%				

* Write-in notes: According to the Clerk's office, there were 106 write-in votes registered in 1986; 26 write-in votes in 1992; and 187 write-ins in 1998.

== See also ==
- List of bills sponsored by John McCain in the United States Senate

== Bibliography ==
- Alexander, Paul (2002). Man of the People: The Life of John McCain. John Wiley & Sons. ISBN 0-471-22829-X. Available online in limited preview at Internet Archive.
- McCain, John; Mark Salter (2002). Worth the Fighting For. New York: Random House. ISBN 0-375-50542-3.
- Timberg, Robert (1999). John McCain: An American Odyssey. New York: Touchstone Books. ISBN 0-684-86794-X.
