= Executive Office of the President of the United States =

U.S. government executive agency

- Seal of the Executive Office

- Flag of the Executive Office

Agency overview
- Formed: July 1, 1939; 87 years ago
- Jurisdiction: U.S. Federal Government
- Headquarters: White House, Washington, D.C., U.S.
- Employees: 1,800 (approximately)
- Annual budget: $714 million
- Agency executive: Stephen Miller, White House Chief of Staff
- Website: whitehouse.gov/eop

The Executive Office of the President of the United States (EOP) comprises the offices and agencies that support the work of the president at the center of the executive branch of the United States federal government. The office consists of several offices and agencies, such as the White House Office (the staff working closest with the president, including West Wing staff), the National Security Council, Homeland Security Council, Office of Management and Budget, Council of Economic Advisers, and others. The Eisenhower Executive Office Building houses most staff.

The office is also referred to as a "permanent government", since many policy programs, and the people who are charged with implementing them, continue between presidential administrations.

The civil servants who work in the Executive Office of the President are regarded as nonpartisan and politically neutral, so they are capable of providing objective and impartial advice.

With the increase in technological and global advancement, the size of the White House staff has increased to include an array of policy experts responsible for managing various federal governmental functions and policy areas. As of 2015, it included approximately 1,800 positions, most of which did not require confirmation from the U.S. Senate.

The office is overseen by the White House chief of staff. Since November 9, 2026, that position has been held by Stephen Miller, who was appointed by President Donald Trump. His predecessor, Susie Wiles, was the first woman to hold the title.

== History ==
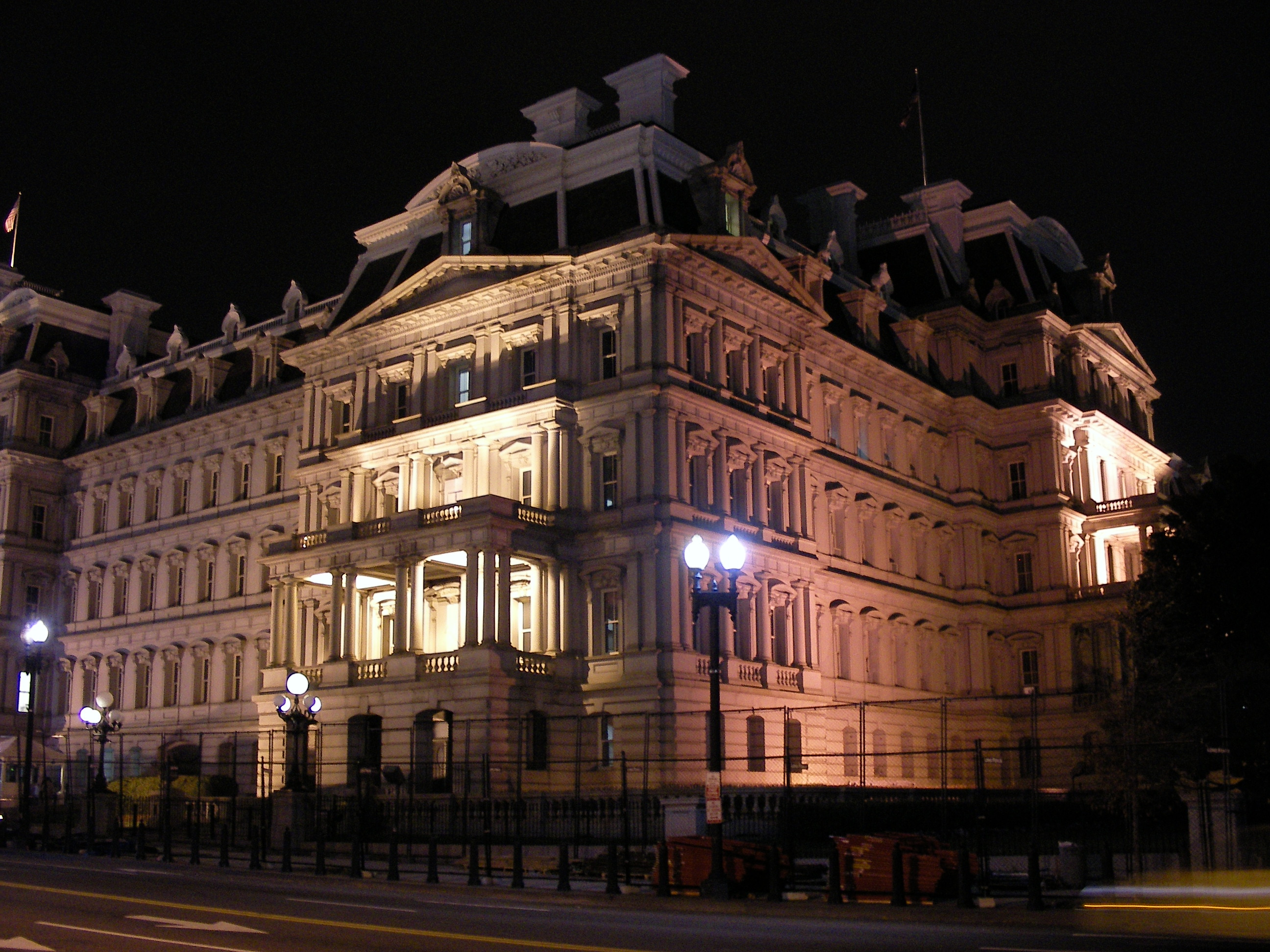
The Eisenhower Executive Office Building at night

In 1937, the Brownlow Committee, which was a presidentially commissioned panel of political science and public administration experts, recommended sweeping changes to the executive branch of the U.S. federal government, including the creation of the Executive Office of the President. Based on these recommendations, President Franklin D. Roosevelt in 1939 lobbied Congress to approve the Reorganization Act of 1939. The Act led to Reorganization Plan No. 1, which created the office, which reported directly to the president.

The office encompassed two subunits at its outset, the White House Office (WHO) and the Bureau of the Budget, the predecessor to today's Office of Management and Budget, which was created in 1921 and originally located in the Treasury Department. It absorbed most of the functions of the National Emergency Council. Initially, the new staff system appeared more ambitious on paper than in practice; the increase in the size of the staff was quite modest at the start. However, it laid the groundwork for the large and organizationally complex White House staff that emerged during the presidencies of Roosevelt's successors.

Roosevelt's efforts are also notable in contrast to those of his predecessors in office. During the 19th century, presidents had few staff resources. Thomas Jefferson had one messenger and one secretary at his disposal, both of whose salaries were paid by the president personally. It was not until 1857 that Congress appropriated money ($2,500) for the hiring of one clerk.

By Ulysses S. Grant's presidency (1869–1877), the staff had grown to three. By 1900, the White House staff included one "secretary to the president" (then the title of the president's chief aide), two assistant secretaries, two executive clerks, a stenographer, and seven other office personnel. Under Warren G. Harding, there were thirty-one staff, although most were in clerical positions.

During Herbert Hoover's presidency, two additional secretaries to the president were added by Congress, one of whom Hoover designated as his press secretary. From 1933 to 1939, as he greatly expanded the scope of the federal government's policies and powers in response to the Great Depression, Roosevelt relied on his "brain trust" of top advisers, who were often appointed to vacant positions in agencies and departments, from which they drew their salaries since the White House lacked statutory or budgetary authority to create new staff positions.

After World War II, in particular, during the Eisenhower presidency, the staff was expanded and reorganized. Eisenhower, a former U.S. Army general, had been Supreme Allied Commander during the war and reorganized the Executive Office to suit his leadership style.

As of 2009, the staff is much bigger. Estimates indicate some 3,000 to 4,000 persons serve in office staff positions with policymaking responsibilities, with a budget of $300 to $400 million (George W. Bush's budget request for FY2005 was for $341 million in support of 1,850 personnel).

Some observers have noted a problem of control for the president due to the increase in staff and departments, making coordination and cooperation between the various departments of the Executive Office more difficult.

== Organization ==
The president has the power to reorganize the EOP under the 1949 Reorganization Act, which gave the president considerable discretion. The law was renewed in 1983, after President Reagan's administration allegedly encountered "disloyalty and obstruction" in the ranks of EOP personnel.

The chief of staff is the head of the Executive Office of the President and can therefore ultimately decide what the president needs to deal with personally and what can be dealt with by other staff.

Senior staff within the Executive Office of the President have the rank of assistant to the president, second-level staff are deputy assistant to the president, and third-level staff are special assistant to the president.

The core White House staff appointments—and most EOP officials generally—are not required to be confirmed by the U.S. Senate, although there are a handful of exceptions (e.g., the director of the Office of Management and Budget, the chair of the Council of Economic Advisers, and the United States trade representative).

=== Assistants to the President ===
The information in the following table is current as of January 20, 2025. Only principal executives are listed; for subordinate officers, see individual office pages.

Members of the Executive Office of the President of the United States
Agency	Principal executive	Incumbent
White House Office	Assistant to the president and chief of staff	Stephen Miller
National Security Council	Assistant to the president for national security affairs (national security advisor)	Marco Rubio
Homeland Security Council (Note: shares staff with the National Security Council)	Assistant to the president for homeland security (Note: reports to the National Security Advisor)	Stephen Miller
Council of Economic Advisers	Chair of the White House Council of Economic Advisers	Christopher Phelan
Council on Environmental Quality	Chair of the Council on Environmental Quality	Katherine Scarlett
Executive Residence Staff and Operations	White House chief usher	Robert B. Downing
National Space Council	Executive secretary of the National Space Council	Chirag Parikh
President's Intelligence Advisory Board	Chair of the President's Intelligence Advisory Board	Devin Nunes
Office of Administration	Director of the Office of Administration	Joshua Fisher
Office of Management and Budget	Director of the Office of Management and Budget	Russell Vought
Office of National Drug Control Policy	Director of National Drug Control Policy	Sara Carter
Office of the National Cyber Director	National cyber director	Sean Cairncross
Office of Science and Technology Policy	Director of the Office of Science and Technology Policy	Michael Kratsios
Office of the United States Trade Representative	United States trade representative	Jamieson Greer
Office of the Vice President of the United States	Assistant to the president and chief of staff to the vice president	Jacob Reses

=== Deputy Assistants to the President ===
The following is a list of Deputy Assistants to the President serving in the White House Office.

Deputy Assistants to the President
Office	Position	Incumbent
White House Office	Deputy Assistant to the President and Deputy Staff Secretary	Benjamin H. Moss
White House Office	Deputy Assistant to the President and Deputy Communications Director	Kaelan Dorr
White House Office	Deputy Assistant to the President for Legislative Affairs	Chester Fields
White House Office	Deputy Assistant to the President and Deputy Counsel to the President	Gary Lawkowski
White House Office	Deputy Assistant to the President and Faith Director	Jennifer S. Korn
White House Office	Deputy Assistant to the President and Senior Policy Strategist	Sylvia Mailman
White House Office	Deputy Assistant to the President and Director of Oval Office Operations	Waltine Nauta
White House Office	Deputy Assistant to the President for Domestic Policy	Heidi Overton
White House Office	Deputy Assistant to the President for Coalition Policy and Engagement	Lynne Patton
White House Office	Deputy Assistant to the President and Technical Advisor	Gabriel Perez
White House Office	Deputy Assistant to the President and Principal Deputy Communications Director	Alexander Pfeiffer
Office of the Vice President	Deputy Assistant to the President and Deputy Chief of Staff to the Vice President	Will Martin
Office of Intergovernmental Affairs	Deputy Assistant to the President and Director of the Office of Intergovernmental Affairs	Alex Meyer
Office of Legislative Affairs	Deputy Assistant to the President and Deputy Director of the Office of Legislative Affairs	Jay Fields
Office of Legislative Affairs	Deputy Assistant to the President and Deputy Director of the Office of Legislative Affairs	Jeff Freeland
Office of Legislative Affairs	Deputy Assistant to the President and Deputy Director of the Office of Legislative Affairs	Matthew McMullan
Office of Public Liaison	Deputy Assistant to the President and Director of the Office of Public Liaison	James Goyer
Office of Presidential Personnel	Deputy Assistant to the President and Deputy Director of Presidential Personnel	Trent Morse
National Economic Council	Deputy Assistant to the President for Economic Policy and Deputy Director of the National Economic Council	Robin Colwell

=== White House offices ===
The White House Office (including its various offices listed below) is a sub-unit of the Executive Office of the President. The various agencies of the EOP are listed above.

- Office of the Chief of Staff
- Office of the National Security Advisor
- Domestic Policy Council
- National Economic Council
- Office of Cabinet Affairs
- Office of Digital Strategy
- White House Office of Communications
- Office of the First Lady
- Office of Intergovernmental Affairs
- Office of Legislative Affairs
- Office of Management and Administration
- Office of Political Affairs
- Office of Public Engagement
- Office of Presidential Personnel
- Office of Scheduling and Advance
- Office of the Staff Secretary
- Office of White House Counsel
- Oval Office Operations
- White House Fellows
- White House Military Office

== Congress ==
Congress and the president share control over the Executive Office of the President. Congressional authority over the office stems from its appropriation power under the Constitution (power of the purse), which affects the Office of Management and Budget and the funding of all other federal departments and agencies. Congress also has the right to investigate the operation of the EOP, and can summon individual EOP personnel to testify before its various committees.

The Executive Office often helps with legislation by filling in specific points understood and written by experts, as congressional legislation sometimes starts in broad terms.

== Budget history ==
This table specifies the budget of the Executive Office for the years 2008–2017, and the actual outlays for the years 1962–2023.

Budget & Outlays of the Executive Office
Year	Budget	Outlays
2023		$540 million
2022		$457 million
2021		$428 million
2020		$400 million
2019		$424 million
2018		$379 million
2017	$714 million	$411 million
2016	$692 million	$397 million
2015	$676 million	$397 million
2014	$624 million	$375 million
2013	$650 million	$380 million
2012	$640 million	$405 million
2011	$708 million	$484 million
2010	$772 million	$582 million
2009	$728 million	$743 million
2008	$682 million	$1173 million
2007		$2956 million
2006		$5379 million
2005		$7686 million
2004		$3349 million
2003		$386 million
2002		$451 million
2001		$246 million
2000		$283 million
1999		$417 million
1998		$237 million
1997		$221 million
1996		$202 million
1995		$215 million
1994		$231 million
1993		$194 million
1992		$186 million
1991		$193 million
1990		$158 million
1989		$124 million
1988		$122 million
1987		$110 million
1986		$108 million
1985		$111 million
1984		$96 million
1983		$94 million
1982		$95 million
1981		$96 million
1980		$96 million
1979		$81 million
1978		$75 million
1977		$74 million
1976		$80 million
1975		$93 million
1974		$67 million
1973		$50 million
1972		$47 million
1971		$38 million
1970		$29 million
1969		$24 million
1968		$21 million
1967		$19 million
1966		$16 million
1965		$16 million
1964		$15 million
1963		$13 million
1962		$12 million

== See also ==
- Title 3 of the Code of Federal Regulations
- Title 5 of the Code of Federal Regulations
- White House Records Office
- President's Room
