= Jim Hensley =

American business magnate (1920–2000)

- Born: James Willis Hensley; April 12, 1920; San Antonio, Texas, U.S.
- Died: June 21, 2000 (aged 80); Phoenix, Arizona, U.S.
- Occupation: Business magnate
- Known for: One of Arizona's richest men; Father-in-law of U.S. Senator and presidential candidate John McCain
- Spouse(s): Mary Jeanne Parks (m. c. 1937; div. 1945) Marguerite "Smitty" Johnson (m. 1945)
- Children: Kathleen Ann Hensley (b. 1943, d. 2017); Cindy Lou Hensley (b. 1954)

James Willis Hensley (April 12, 1920 – June 21, 2000) was an American businessman in the beer industry.

Hensley was born in Texas and moved to Arizona during his youth. He was a bombardier on B-17 Flying Fortresses during World War II and was awarded the Distinguished Flying Cross. After the war he was convicted of illegal distribution of liquor and was also involved in a racetrack operation that was investigated by authorities.

He founded Hensley & Co. in 1955. Headquartered in Phoenix, it grew to become one of the largest Anheuser-Busch beer distributorships in the nation. One of Arizona's richest men at the time of his death, Hensley was the father of Cindy Hensley McCain and the father-in-law of United States Senator and former Republican presidential candidate John McCain.

== Early life, military service and family ==
Hensley was born on April 12, 1920 in San Antonio to Jessie and James L. Hensley. The family was poor and his father suffered from alcoholism. They lived in the South until moving to Arizona; Hensley graduated from Phoenix Union High School in 1936. He married Mary Jeanne Parks, his high school sweetheart, around 1937, and worked as a paper salesman.

Hensley and his older brother, Eugene, began working in the liquor distribution business before World War II, in the employ of Kemper Marley, Sr., an Arizona rancher who had become wealthy in that business in Phoenix and Tucson following the end of Prohibition. The brothers started the United Liquor Co. in Phoenix and the United Distribution Co. in Tucson.

Jim Hensley served three years as an officer in the United States Army Air Forces during World War II. He was a bombardier on B-17 Flying Fortresses. On his thirteenth mission, his plane was shot down over the English Channel; around the same time, his wife gave birth to their daughter, Kathleen Ann Hensley, in February 1943. In all, his planes were shot down two or three times. He was awarded the Distinguished Flying Cross.

Hensley was injured during his service, and sent to a West Virginia medical facility to recover. There he met Marguerite "Smitty" Johnson (born Cairo, Illinois, January 16, 1919, died Scottsdale, Arizona, October 11, 2006, daughter of Swedish American parents), who had one daughter, Dixie, from a previous relationship. Hensley divorced his wife, and shortly thereafter married Marguerite on March 29, 1945, in Memphis, Tennessee, while on leave from the USAAF. They had one child together, Cindy Lou Hensley, born 1954. Hensley's first daughter grew up with her mother, but he maintained occasional contact with her.

== Early business career, legal issues ==
Following his discharge in 1945, Hensley and his brother went back to work for Marley in his United Sales Company in Phoenix and United Distributors in Tucson. In 1948, both brothers were prosecuted by the federal government and convicted of multiple counts of falsifying liquor records in a conspiracy to conceal illegal distribution of whiskey against post-war rationing regulations. Jim Hensley received a six-month sentence (later upheld but suspended by an appeals court) while his brother received a year in federal prison, and both were fined. In 1953, Jim Hensley and Marley were charged by federal prosecutors with falsifying liquor records. Defended by future Supreme Court Justice William Rehnquist, they were acquitted.

In December 1952, the Hensley brothers bought into the Ruidoso Downs racetrack in New Mexico, with Eugene running it and Jim returning to Phoenix. In a May 1953 hearing before the New Mexico State Racing Commission, the Hensley brothers concealed the existence an equal partner, Clarence "Teak" Baldwin, who had been banned from any ownership role due to illegal bookmaking activities. A 1953 New Mexico State Police investigation found further that Kemper Marley was a financial backer for bookmakers and had connections with Baldwin and with the bookmaking operations of organized crime, a conclusion echoed decades later by the Arizona Project investigative reporting team. The Hensley brothers gained their Ruidoso Downs racetrack license in 1953, as no New Mexico law barred convicted felons from race track ownership, although in 1955 new Governor of New Mexico John F. Simms said he was "appalled" by the previous administration's decision to do so. Previous Governor Edwin L. Mechem had defended the approval, saying that the Hensleys had been under constant surveillance and deserved continued attention, but that no action was taken against them because the investigation showed that as race tracks go, all laws apparently were being observed. Jim Hensley sold his interest in Ruidoso Downs to his brother Eugene in 1955 (who in turn sold it to a Marley-connected company in 1969).

== Hensley & Co. ==
In 1955, Hensley founded the beer distributorship that bore his name, borrowing $10,000 against everything he had to buy a small existing distributorship. He was given a state liquor license despite his normally disqualifying past felony conviction. At the start it had 15 workers, sold 73,000 cases of beer a year, and had a 6 percent market share. Hensley soon switched to exclusively distributing Anheuser-Busch beer. Under the early names Hensley & Company Distributors and Hensley & Company Wholesale, the company saw decades of steady growth. It was aided by the Phoenix area becoming one of the fastest-growing regions of the country while the company maintained its position as Anheuser-Busch's only distributor there. Jim Hensley's tireless sales efforts and the generous wages and benefits he gave employees were also key success factors. By 1980 the business had become quite successful and Jim Hensley was a multi-millionaire. Hensley had also distanced himself from Marley, and had helped set up a local hospital; nevertheless, he was never fully accepted by the Phoenix establishment.

In 1981, Hensley hired his new son-in-law John McCain, who had married his daughter Cindy the previous year, as Vice President of Public Relations for Hensley & Co. McCain soon left to begin his Congressional career with a victory in the 1982 election for U.S. House of Representatives. Jim Hensley's past record with the law, as well as his past connection to Marley (who was suspected by the police in the 1976 car-bomb murder of Arizona Republic investigative reporter Don Bolles), were raised by McCain's opponent in the 1986 general election campaign for the U.S. Senate. McCain won that election handily.

As his business continued to grow, Hensley became one of Arizona's richest men, although he never sought publicity. He held most of the stock in Hensley & Co., although by 2000 his health was poor and he had withdrawn from daily operational control. With 500 employees, annual revenues had grown to about $220 million on 20 million cases of beer sold; Hensley & Co. was the second-largest Anheuser-Busch distributor in the nation, the fifth-largest beer distributorship overall in the nation and the 12th largest privately held company in Arizona. Jim Hensley was a major contributor to charity in the Phoenix metropolitan area as well, starting the Hensley Family Foundation. He also supported groups such as NASCAR and Gilbert Rodeo Days.

Hensley died in Phoenix on June 21, 2000. His frequently-amended will left his entire estate to Cindy Hensley McCain, who thus became controlling stockholder and board chair after his death. His first daughter Kathleen, her husband and children had received substantial ongoing gifts, credit cards, and college tuition payments in the decade before his death, but were left only a modest lump sum from his estate.
