= Carol McCain =

American former political aide and event planner

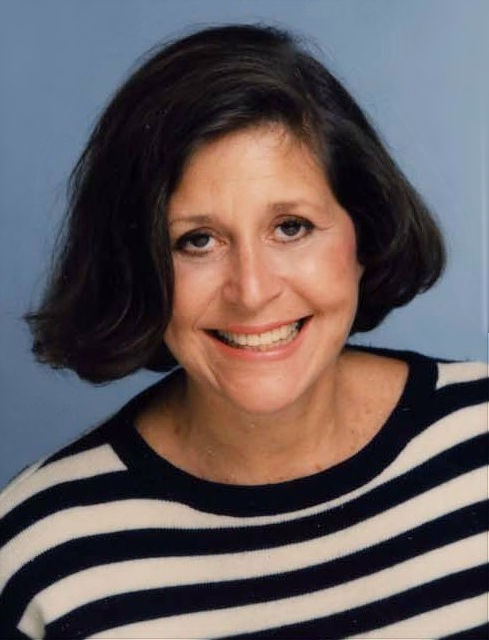
- McCain in 1986

Director of the White House Visitors Office
- In office 1981–1987
- President: Ronald Reagan
- Preceded by: Nancy Willing
- Succeeded by: Debra Romash

Personal details
- Born: Carol Shepp; February 19, 1938 (age 88) Pennsylvania, U.S.
- Party: Republican
- Spouses: Alasdair E. Swanson (m. 1958; div. 1964) John McCain (m. 1965; div. 1980)
- Children: 3
- Education: Centenary University

Carol Shepp McCain (born February 19, 1938) is an American former political aide and event planner who served as the director of the White House Visitors Office from 1981 to 1987, during the Reagan administration. She was the first wife of United States senator John McCain.

== Early life and first marriage ==
Shepp was born in Pennsylvania in 1937, to Joseph Shepp (1908–1986), an insurance agent, and Mary Shepp (née Madrazo; 1908–2000). She grew up in Lansdowne, Pennsylvania, outside Philadelphia. Shepp graduated from Lansdowne-Aldan High School in 1955, winning a scholarship award.

Shepp attended Centenary Junior College for Women in Hackettstown, New Jersey, beginning in 1956. She majored in English.

Five feet eight inches (1.73 m) tall, Shepp was a swimsuit and runway model for Jantzen swimwear in Philadelphia. She also worked as a secretary.

Shepp first met John McCain while he was attending the United States Naval Academy in Annapolis from 1954 to 1958, but in 1958, she married one of his midshipman classmates, Alasdair E. Swanson, who had been a football and basketball star there. She and Swanson, who became a Navy pilot, had two sons, Douglas (1959–2026) and Andrew (born 1962), and lived in Pensacola, Florida. The Swansons divorced in June 1964, after she sued him for infidelity.

== Marriage to John McCain ==
=== Marriage and family ===
Shepp met John McCain again when he was stationed at the Naval Air Basic Training Command at Pensacola in 1964, and after her divorce from Swanson, the two began dating. McCain frequently took training flights from Florida up to Philadelphia to see her on weekends.

On July 3, 1965, Shepp and McCain married in Philadelphia. The ceremony was held at the home of the family that owned the well known Old Original Bookbinder's seafood restaurant in Philadelphia; one of the Bookbinder family members was a close friend of Shepp from college.

Following the wedding, McCain adopted his wife's two sons; the couple had a daughter together, Sidney, in September 1966.

=== Apart during Vietnam War ===
John McCain was shot down over North Vietnam on October 26, 1967; he was captured and would remain a prisoner of war for five and a half years. During her husband's captivity, McCain raised their children in Orange Park, Florida, with the assistance of friends and neighbors in the Navy-oriented community. She sent frequent letters and packages to him, few of which his captors let through. She became active in the POW/MIA movement, while those around her wore POW bracelets with her husband's name and capture date engraved on them.

While visiting family and friends in the Philadelphia area on Christmas Eve 1969, McCain skidded and crashed into a telephone pole as she was navigating an icy, snowy, isolated portion of Pennsylvania Route 320 near Gulph Mills, Pennsylvania, driving alone. She was thrown from her car into the snow, going into shock; she thought she would never be seen and would die there. Hours later she was found and taken to Bryn Mawr Hospital. She suffered two smashed legs, a broken pelvis, broken arm, and a ruptured spleen. She spent six months in the hospital and underwent 23 operations over the following two years in order to rebuild her legs with rods and pins, and had extensive physical therapy. During this time, her daughter stayed with her parents in Landsdowne while her sons stayed with friends in Florida.

McCain did not tell her husband about the accident in her letters, believing he already had enough to worry about. The U.S. State Department contacted her surgeon the next day with a warning; as the doctor later said:

They told me [the person I had operated on] was Carol McCain, her husband is a prisoner of war in Hanoi, and her father-in-law [is] supreme commander of the Pacific Fleet. They said don't give any info to anyone, because they were concerned that he would be subjected to more torture.

Businessman and POW advocate Ross Perot paid for McCain's medical care. She remained grateful to Perot, later remarking: "The military families are in Ross's heart and in his soul...There are millions of us who are extremely grateful to Ross Perot". Years after her husband found out about Perot's help, he said "we loved him for it". McCain was interviewed on CBS Evening News in 1970 and said Christmas had no meaning for her without her husband but that she carried on with it for their children.

=== Reuniting and divorce ===
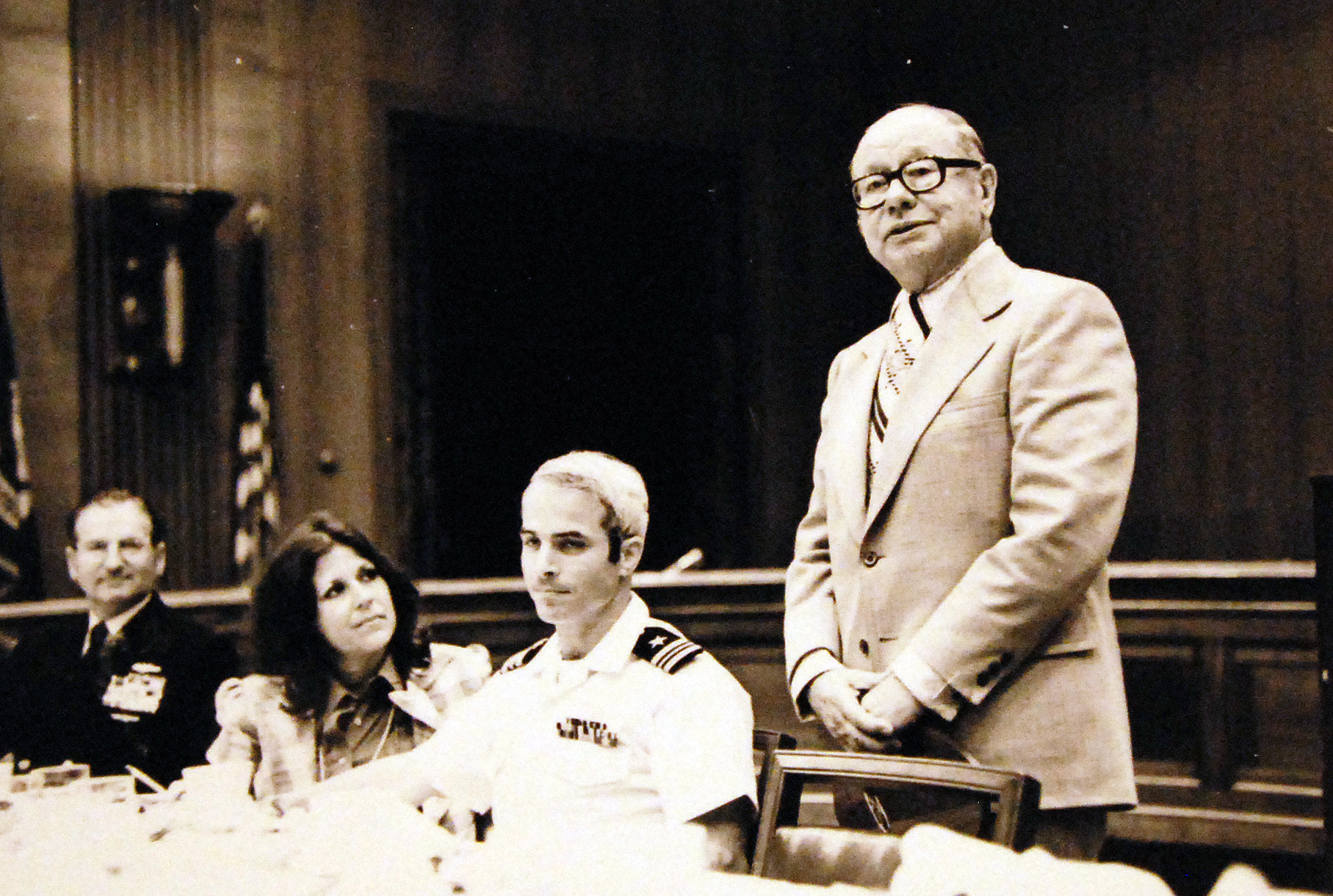
Carol McCain (left center) and John McCain (right center) at a May 1973 appearance on Capitol Hill in Washington in honor of returned POWs. The person standing is Senator Carl Curtis from Nebraska.

McCain and her husband were reunited upon his release from captivity on March 14, 1973. She was now four inches (ten centimeters) shorter, in a wheelchair or on crutches, and substantially heavier than when he had last seen her. He was also visibly hampered by his injuries and the mistreatment he had endured from the North Vietnamese.

Following his return, the McCains were introduced to, and then became frequent guests of honor at dinners hosted by Governor of California Ronald Reagan and his wife Nancy Reagan. The two couples became friendly. Carol McCain was the Clay County director for Reagan's 1976 presidential campaign as he sought the Republican Party nomination. Her husband's assignments as executive officer, then commanding officer, of A-7 attack squadron VA-174 at NAS Cecil Field saw the couple leading an active social life. Such engagements included entertaining other naval personnel at their Orange Park home and Ponte Vedra beach house. McCain's marriage, however, began to falter due to her husband's partying away from home and extramarital affairs.

Her husband's next assignment was to the Senate Liaison Office within the Navy's Office of Legislative Affairs. The McCains separated briefly, then reunited. His job was aided by the social life the couple conducted, entertaining Navy, government, and other persons three to four nights a week at their Alexandria, Virginia, home. During this time she worked as a staff aide for Congressman John H. Rousselot of California. By 1979, the McCains were still living together.

In April 1979, John McCain started an affair with Cindy Lou Hensley, an Arizona special education teacher and Hensley & Co. heiress. He then pushed to end their marriage, and friends described Carol as being in shock. The McCains stopped cohabitating in January 1980; he filed for divorce in February 1980, which she accepted. When asked by a friend what had gone wrong, she said, "It's just one of those things." The uncontested divorce became official in Fort Walton Beach on April 2, 1980.

Her ex-husband would later state that he felt the demise of his marriage was due to his "selfishness and immaturity more than it was to Vietnam, and I cannot escape blame by pointing a finger at the war. The blame was entirely mine." Regarding her divorce, McCain said, "The breakup of our marriage was not caused by my accident or Vietnam or any of those things. I don't know that it might not have happened if John had never been gone. I attribute it more to John turning 40 and wanting to be 25 again than I do to anything else." John McCain's biographer Robert Timberg wrote, however, "Vietnam did play a part, perhaps not the major part, but more than a walk-on." Ross Perot gave his own assessment of the McCain divorce: "After he came home, he walked with a limp, she [Carol McCain] walked with a limp. So he threw her over for a poster girl with big money from Arizona [Cindy McCain] and the rest is history." McCain's three children were initially upset with their father about the divorce, but later reconciled with him.

=== Amicable relations ===
The divorce settlement afforded Carol McCain full custody of her three children as well as alimony, child support, college tuition for the children, houses in Virginia and Florida, and lifelong financial support for her continuing medical treatment. She was sued by her former mother-in-law, Roberta McCain, in 1980 for return of personal property, with the suit settled out of court in 1981. In 1981, McCain said that the divorce "was the hardest thing I've ever been through. I lost my husband and my best friend."

Despite the breakup, McCain remained on good terms with her ex-husband, supporting him in his subsequent political campaigns. She refused to discuss her marriage with an election opponent of her ex-husband in 1982 who was seeking negative information, telling the opponent that "a gentleman never would have called." During his 2008 presidential campaign, McCain said of her former husband: "He's a good guy. We are still good friends. He is the best man for president."

== Subsequent career ==
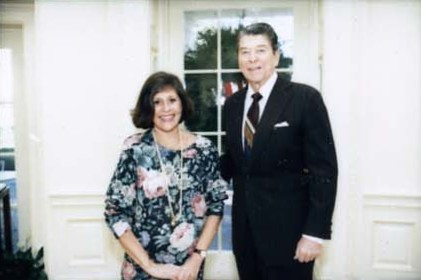
McCain with President Ronald Reagan in 1986

=== Reagan campaign ===
McCain moved to La Mesa, California, where she lived for several months with the family of top Reagan associate Edwin Meese (Meese's wife Ursala had known John S. McCain Sr. as a little girl and the families stayed in touch). Carol became a personal assistant to Nancy Reagan in the fall of 1979, working with her as a press assistant on Ronald Reagan's 1980 presidential campaign, and then worked on the 1980 Republican National Convention. Campaign travel was difficult for her due to the effects of her injuries, and her feet often swelled badly, but fellow staffers noted that she always maintained an upbeat disposition.

Following Reagan's victory, she served as director of the 1981 Reagan inaugural ball, and as the Reagan administration began, she handled scheduling for the First Lady and the Reagan children.

=== Director of White House Visitors Office ===
In 1981 she became Director of the White House Visitors Office. There she planned tours and dealt with the pleas of different groups for the limited slots available. She also dealt with demands from Washington officials, including a dispute about tour slots between Nancy Reagan and New York Congressman Thomas Downey. Regarding the pressures of her job, she said cheerfully, "I'm always in tears, but I love the job. I'm really having a ball." During the early 1980s recession, she declared that the White House tours were fully booked even when other Washington attractions saw declining attendance; her office processed well over one million visits a year. She was a well-liked presence on the Washington social scene.

Between 1981 and 1986, she greatly expanded the annual White House Easter Egg Roll, adding participatory activities and doubling the size of the crowds attending. She arranged for celebrities attending White House events to sign eggs, as well as National Football League players, with the result that some 10,000 of the eggs discovered by children were signed. The Washington Post likened her "extravaganza-loving" event style to that of Cecil B. DeMille.

She was involved in planning the president's Fourth of July party for 3,500 staffers and families as well as autumn barbeques for some congressional delegations. She also planned the South Lawn State Arrival Ceremonies, as well as a national Christmas celebration. She credited her ability to handle such events to her background as the wife of an officer: "As a Navy wife you have to learn how to give a party on short notice and entertain for 50 or 100."

=== Private sector ===
McCain left the White House Visitors Office position in January 1987 to join Philadelphia-based We the People 200, Inc., which was the organization planning the celebration later that year for the 200th anniversary of the signing of the United States Constitution. She was named programming director, part of We the People 200's senior management team. The bicentennial project was already troubled by lack of corporate financial sponsorship and persistent internal conflicts; the high salaries of McCain and other senior staff came under some criticism, but were defended by the organization's president as justified based upon age and experience. In any case, the We the People 200 celebrations took place as scheduled on September 17, 1987, in Philadelphia.

By 1990, she was a spokesperson for Washington, Inc., a large event planning company. During 1991, she was a spokesperson for the Desert Storm Homecoming Foundation, which held a $12 million victory celebration and memorial in Washington in June 1991 following the conclusion of the Gulf War and Operation Desert Storm. She later worked in press relations for the National Soft Drink Association in Washington.

In 2003, McCain retired and moved to a bungalow in Virginia Beach. While she has had romantic relationships since her divorce, McCain has not remarried. A friend of the family, who was interviewed by The Washington Post in 2008, recounted McCain's reasoning why she never remarried: "She had a lot of boyfriends. She was going out with one fellow who was so terrific. And I said: 'He's so in love with you. You'll have a terrific life together.' She said, 'No, I don't think so.' She's never fallen in love with anyone else. [John McCain] was a hard act to follow."
