= Hensley & Co. =

Beverage company

Hensley Beverage Co.
- Company type: Private
- Industry: Beverages
- Founded: 1955
- Headquarters: Phoenix, Arizona, United States
- Key people: Cindy Hensley McCain (Chair); Robert Delgado (CEO); Andrew McCain (President)
- Products: Distribution of beers, lagers, malt beverages, wines, energy drinks
- Revenue: $350 million (2009)
- Number of employees: 1,200 (2018)
- Website: www.hensley.com

Hensley Beverage Company, previously known as Hensley & Co., is a wholesaler and distributor for Anheuser-Busch beer, and later for a variety of other brands and drinks, that is headquartered in the West Phoenix area of Phoenix, Arizona. As of 2007, it was the third-largest Anheuser-Busch distributor in the United States and one of the largest privately held companies in Arizona.

The company was founded in 1955 by Arizona businessman Jim Hensley and steadily grew based upon population growth in the region and a close arrangement with Anheuser-Busch. Following Hensley's death in 2000, his daughter Cindy Hensley McCain became the controlling owner. At the height of prominence of her husband, U.S. Senator and two-time presidential candidate John McCain, Hensley & Co. was arguably the best-known beer distributorship in America.

Previously focused on marketing to the Phoenix, Tempe, and Prescott Valley areas, its size and scope increased significantly with the 2016 acquisition of Tucson-based Golden Eagle Distributors, and again in 2023 with the acquisition of the New Mexico–based Premier Distributing Company. Hensley Beverage Company maintains an active presence in the Phoenix area in terms of sponsorships and charitable giving. Its representatives have held high positions in several city and state business groups and the company is active in political discussions that affect the industry.

== History ==
The company was founded in January 1955 by Arizona businessman Jim Hensley on a $10,000 loan. It originally had 12 workers, sold 73,000 cases of beer a year (a case typically being twenty-four 12-oz. bottles or cans), and had a 6 percent market share. While it initially handled many brands of beer, Hensley accepted an offer later in 1955 to become Anheuser-Busch's sole distributor for Maricopa County in return for selling only that brand. Under the names Hensley & Company Distributors and Hensley & Company Wholesale, the company saw decades of steady growth, aided by the Phoenix area becoming one of the fastest-growing regions of the country while the company still maintained exclusivity with Anheuser-Busch. Jim Hensley's tireless sales efforts and the generous wages and benefits he gave employees were also key success factors. Hensley & Co. was the first Anheuser-Busch distributor to invest in refrigerated warehouses, which subsequently became standard in the industry. By 1970, Hensley & Co. had a 20 percent market share; by 1980, that had grown to 50 percent, the business had become quite successful, and Jim Hensley was a multi-millionaire.

In 1981, Jim Hensley's new son-in-law John McCain, recently married to daughter Cindy Hensley McCain and retired from the United States Navy, was hired as Vice President of Public Relations. McCain soon left to begin his Congressional career. In 1993, the company consolidated operations under the name Hensley & Company.

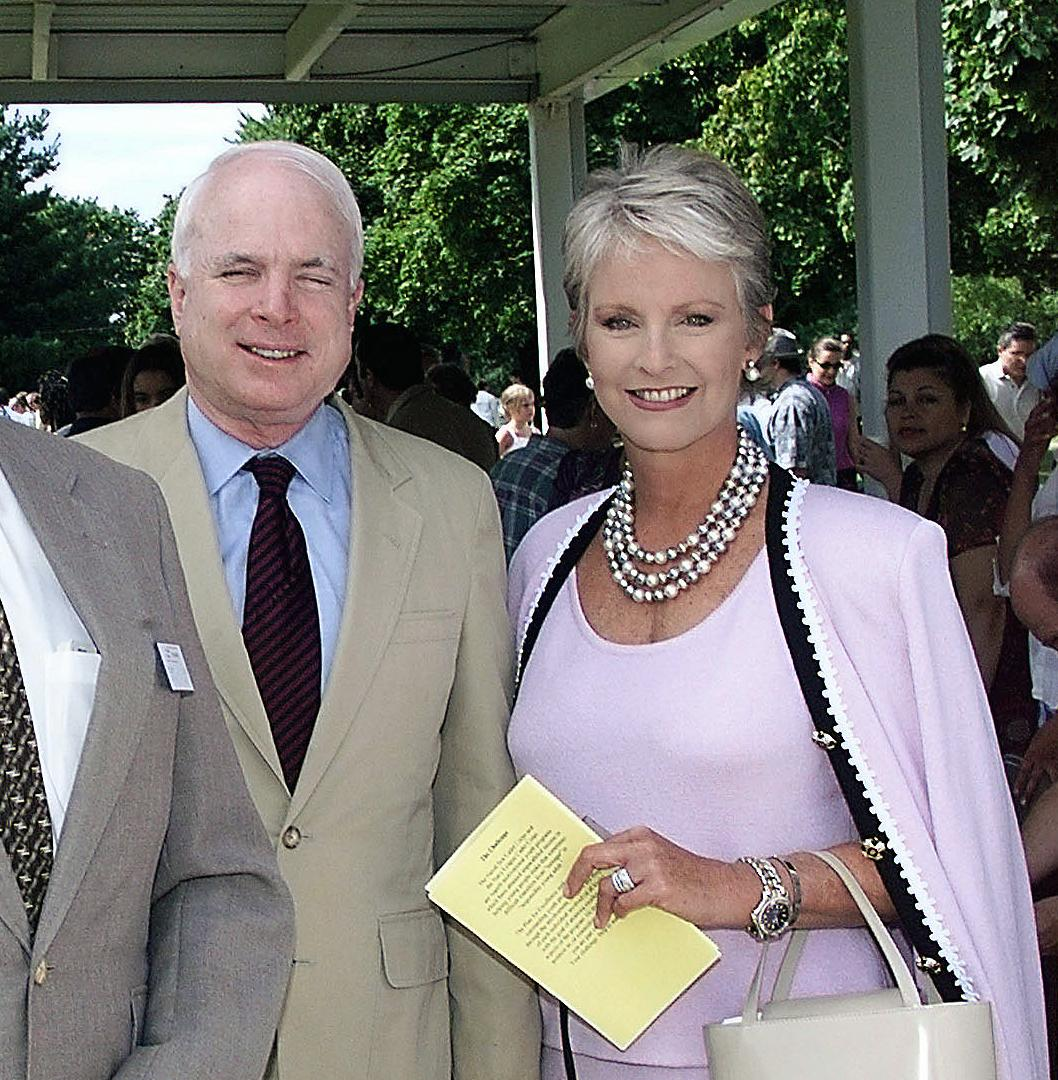
Hensley & Co. chair Cindy Hensley McCain in 2001, with her husband, U.S. Senator John McCain

Robert Delgado, who had been with the company since 1975, was named president in 1994—assuming day-to-day control of the business—and later was named CEO, while Jim Hensley remained chairman. The company also acquired real estate throughout Arizona. John McCain's son Andrew, from his first marriage, joined the firm around 1997; his MBA and banking experience would lead to his becoming the company's CFO and COO, and in 2017, President.

At the time of his death in 2000, Jim Hensley held most of the voting stock. Annual revenues were over $220 million on 20 million cases of beer sold. Cindy Hensley McCain, who had been a vice president, became the controlling stockholder—she, her children, and Andrew McCain together control 68 percent of the company—and chair of the board. As chair, she consults remotely with Delgado on major initiatives such as new products, new plants, employee welfare, or charitable giving. She is considered by Anheuser-Busch to be an absentee owner, and Delgado is required to have complete control over business operations and investment decisions. Anheuser-Busch inquired about buying the distributorship in the early 2000s, preferring not to have absentee owners, but she declined (all their U.S. beer distributorships are privately owned).

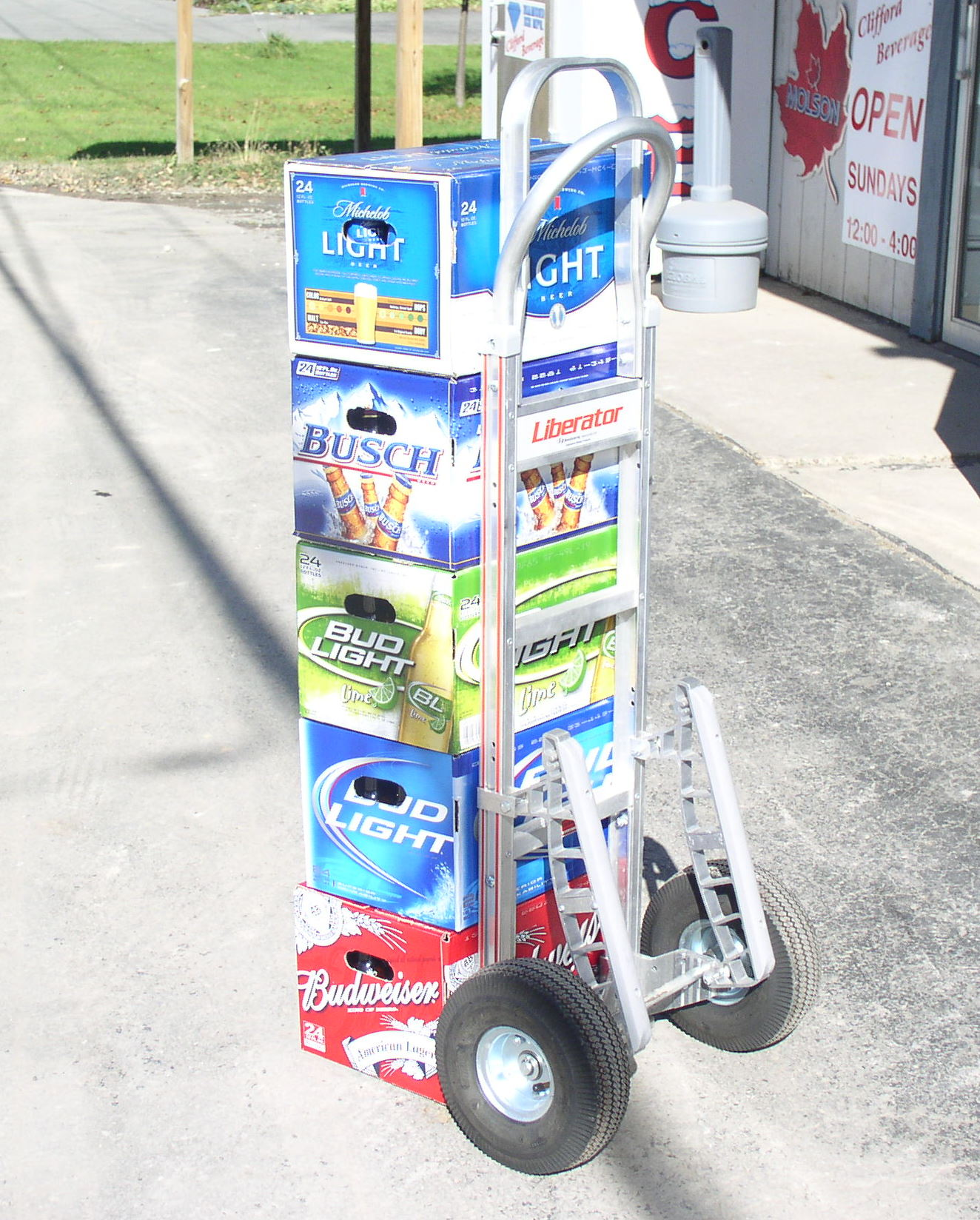
Cases of Anheuser-Busch products

By 2007 Hensley employed 650 people, sold about 23 million cases of beer a year to over 5,000 retail accounts producing revenues of $340 million, and held 60 percent or more market share in its target area. Beverage industry analysts estimated the company's value in 2008 at more than $250 million. Despite the late-2000s recession, which resulted in a rare decline in sales volume, revenues rose slightly to $350 million by 2009 and employment was still 650 in 2010. It subsequently rose to 800 by 2015. The company said it had record revenues in 2014 but did not disclose the amount. The company's workforce was dominated by men in their twenties. The company's facilities included its own printing shop. It operated a fleet of some 750 trucks and other vehicles and conducts its own training program for commercial driver's licenses.

The company's Phoenix distribution plant occupies a number of acres, marked by a giant Budweiser sign. In addition to beer, Hensley also distributes energy drinks, root beer, liquor, and wine, some of which are distributed from a warehouse in Tucson. The move into wine was accelerated by the acquisition of Phoenix-based Quench Fine Wines Ltd. in 2010. Via the holding company King Aviation, Hensley owns and operates Cessna Citation Excel aircraft. Over half the beer sold in the Phoenix area is Anheuser-Busch, making it one of their better markets nationally. Both companies benefit when major sports events are held in the area, such as Super Bowl XLIX. The beer distribution business and its Phoenix market is very competitive; some Anheuser-Busch distributors eventually ended their exclusive arrangements with the beer maker, and for a while Hensley had no plans to do so. However, in 2009 it did, in part related to Hensley's move into craft beers, an emerging force in the market. Hensley worked with Four Peaks Brewery among others. By 2015 Hensley sold some 850 drinks and brands from around the world and had around 8,000 retail customers in the Phoenix area.

In 2016 Hensley acquired another family-owned Arizona firm, Golden Eagle Distributors, based in Tucson and founded in 1974 by Bill Clements. Cindy McCain said, "My father was very, very close with the founders of Golden Eagle. He always considered them good businessmen and women, and patriots to the state of Arizona. ... Arizona is a family and keeping that business in the family was important to me. I didn't want to see someone from outside Arizona come in and do it." The deal increased the number of Hensley employees to over 1,200, its fleet size to over 1,100, and for the first time gave Hensley distribution to virtually the entire state of Arizona.

During the COVID-19 pandemic in the United States, Hensley Beverage Company faced the challenges associated with kegs of beer in the distribution channel reaching their expiration date due to the bars and restaurants that normally sell beer on tap being shut down.

In 2023, Hensley Beverage Company acquired Premier Distributing Company, based in New Mexico. This expanded Hensley's activities outside Arizona for the first time, and made it the biggest distributor of beer and other alcoholic drinks in the Arizona–New Mexico area.

== Political activities ==
Previous logo

Between 1982 and 2000, the company contributed $80,000 to John McCain's political campaigns; from 2001 to 2006, the company and its employees would contribute an additional $24,000. In Congress, McCain recused himself on legislation involving alcohol issues.

In the late 1980s, Jim Hensley was active in legislative battles against neo-prohibitionist movements. In 1992, a former Anheuser-Busch lobbyist accused Hensley & Co. of illegal "bundling" of contributions to state legislators. Hensley denied the claim, which was later withdrawn by the lobbyist with no charges filed.

Hensley & Co. holds a seat on the board of the National Beer Wholesalers Association, and company spokesperson Douglas Yonko is the association's Arizona director. Company executives have contributed heavily to the association's funding. Hensley executives have been active in successfully convincing the Alcohol and Tobacco Tax and Trade Bureau to not require alcohol content displays for beer labels. In the early 2000s, Hensley sought unsuccessfully to keep liquor makers from entering the flavored malt beverage market, while it began distributing such beverages itself, including Anheuser-Busch's Tilt. During the 2010s, Hensley supported proposed state legislation that, within the rigid three-tier framework of producers, distributors, and retailers, would relax production caps on craft breweries with respect to how much beer they can make and "self-distribute", in the belief that such relief would help such breweries grow bigger and eventually need Hensley's distribution services.

Hensley & Co. has continued to be a strong presence in Arizona politics, opposing liquor tax increases in all circumstances, including those targeted for childhood education and children's hospitals. Yonko has also been an officer of the Arizona Chamber of Commerce & Industry, which backed John McCain's successful bid for re-election in 2010. In 2008, Andrew McCain was chairman of the Greater Phoenix Chamber of Commerce, where he focused the group's attention on the state's budget deficit, possible transportation initiatives, and immigration reform.

Like many businesses in the state, Hensley got caught up in the controversy surrounding the Arizona SB 1070 anti-illegal immigration law, with the group Somos America advocating a boycott of Hensley until the company denounced the law. The company called the action "an obvious cheap political stunt motivated solely by self promotion" and said that "Hensley Beverage Company/Budweiser will continue to embrace and encourage the wonderful diversity of our state". The boycott gained little attention. Later that year, Hensley and Delgado joined the Partnership for a New American Economy, an effort started by Michael Bloomberg to push towards comprehensive immigration reform, and in early 2011 Delgado signed a letter from a number of Arizona CEOs directed at Arizona State Senator Russell Pearce requesting that the legislature back off any more anti-illegal immigration measures.

== Community involvements ==
Hensley engages in various local sports sponsorships, including for Phoenix International Raceway. Andrew McCain has served on the board of directors of the Fiesta Bowl and for 2014–15 was named chairman of the bowl.

Hensley is a major contributor to charity in the Phoenix metropolitan area, donating about $1 million per year to various causes and starting the Hensley Employee Foundation in 2001. In addition, the company has helped promote safe ride businesses in an effort to avoid drunk driving incidents. Another event is the Budweiser Shootout Golf Tournament, held in conjunction with the Arizona State University Hispanic Business Alumni since 1991, which has raised over $1 million for Latino student scholarships in the area. Hensley & Co. has also been a supporter of the Phoenix gay community, sponsoring events by the Phoenix Lesbian and Gay Pride Committee, and Cindy McCain and her daughter Meghan McCain were outspoken proponents of the NOH8 Campaign.
