= White House Records Office =

The White House Records Office was a permanent office staffed by civil service employees who remained in their jobs over the course of many administrations. The office was responsible for recording official presidential actions, such as signing legislation and appointing individuals to government positions.

One of the main duties of the Records Office was to process the paperwork connected with the appointment of individuals to government positions. The staff transmitted the nomination to the United States Congress if it required the confirmation of the United States Senate and reported the status of the appointment to the government agencies concerned. The correspondence regarding the appointments was turned over to the White House central files once the appointment process was completed, and was removed from the White House by the departing president at the end of the administration.

In March 1913, at the start of Woodrow Wilson's administration, the staff of the Records Office began to compile a card index to the presidential appointments. This may have been used for reference by the staff as it was retained in the Records Office over succeeding administrations and was not removed by the presidents when they left the White House. For each position filled by a presidential appointee, the office staff prepared an “Appointment to Office” card. This gave the position title, the name of the person appointed to the position, and the date of the appointment. The cards were arranged by the agency in which the position was located. When an office holder left the position, the date of departure was noted on the card and a new entry was made for his successor. When new positions were created, the office staff would usually note on the back of the card the authority, whether by law or executive order, under which the president could fill the position. New cards were also created for each position at the start of a new administration. Over several decades the indexes gradually expanded into a major source of information on the history of the organization of the federal government.

In 1933, at the start of Franklin D. Roosevelt's administration, the office staff began to compile an alphabetical name index to the appointments. These entries were on index cards, and gave the name of the appointee, the position and the date of the appointment. The name cards were filed in two separate series, one for civilian nominations that required Senate confirmation, and one for presidential appointments that did not require Senate confirmation.
