= US Senate career of John McCain (2001–2014) =

Career of John McCain in the United States Senate

John McCain
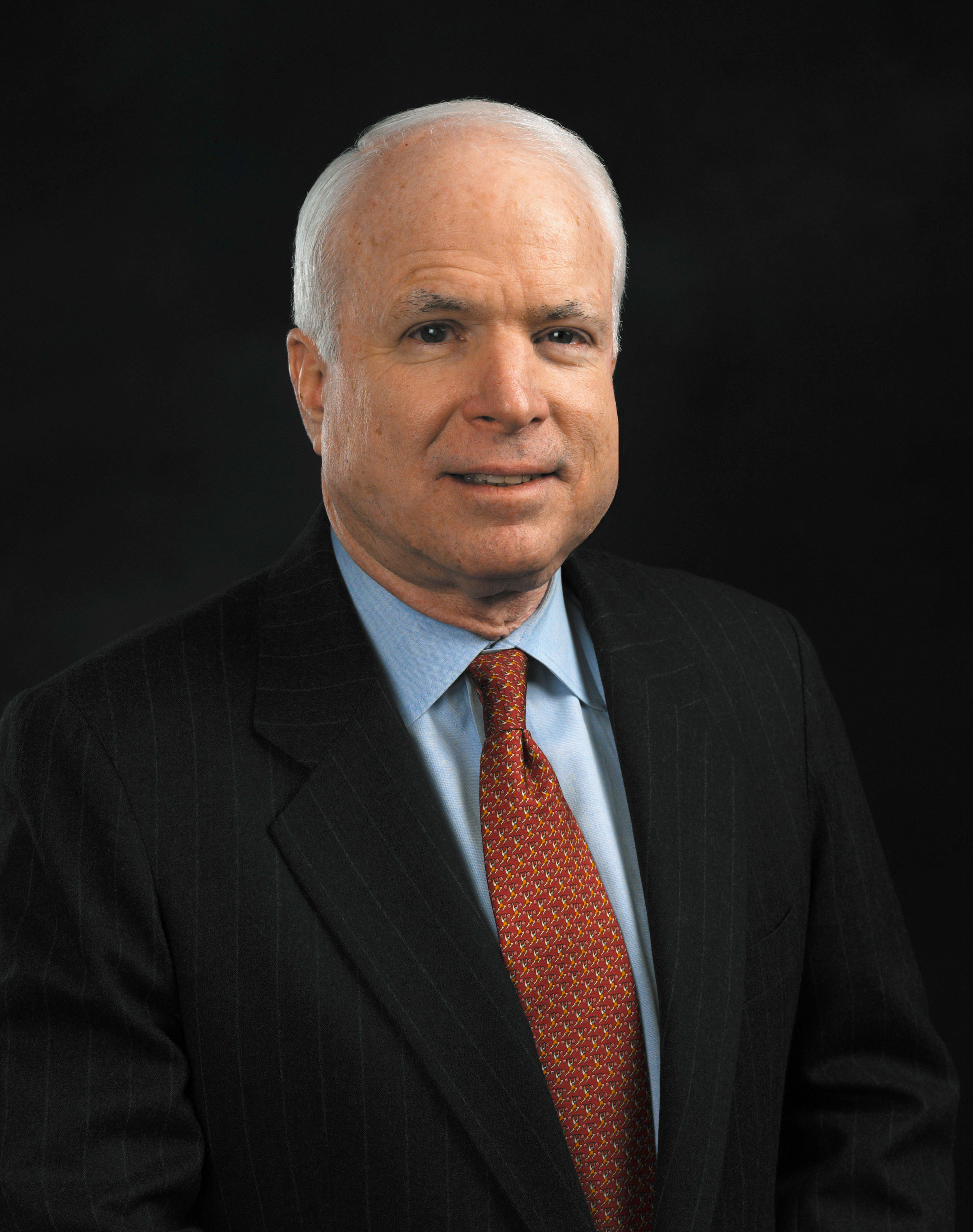

United States Senator from Arizona
- In office January 3, 1987 – August 25, 2018
- Preceded by: Barry Goldwater
- Succeeded by: Jon Kyl

Chairman of the Senate Armed Services Committee
- In office January 3, 2015 – August 25, 2018
- Preceded by: Carl Levin
- Succeeded by: Jim Inhofe

Chairman of the Senate Indian Affairs Committee
- In office January 3, 2005 – January 3, 2007
- Preceded by: Ben Nighthorse Campbell
- Succeeded by: Byron Dorgan
- In office January 3, 1995 – January 3, 1997
- Preceded by: Daniel Inouye
- Succeeded by: Ben Nighthorse Campbell

Chairman of the Senate Commerce Committee
- In office January 3, 2003 – January 3, 2005
- Preceded by: Fritz Hollings
- Succeeded by: Ted Stevens
- In office January 20, 2001 – June 3, 2001
- Preceded by: Fritz Hollings
- Succeeded by: Fritz Hollings
- In office January 3, 1997 – January 3, 2001
- Preceded by: Larry Pressler
- Succeeded by: Fritz Hollings

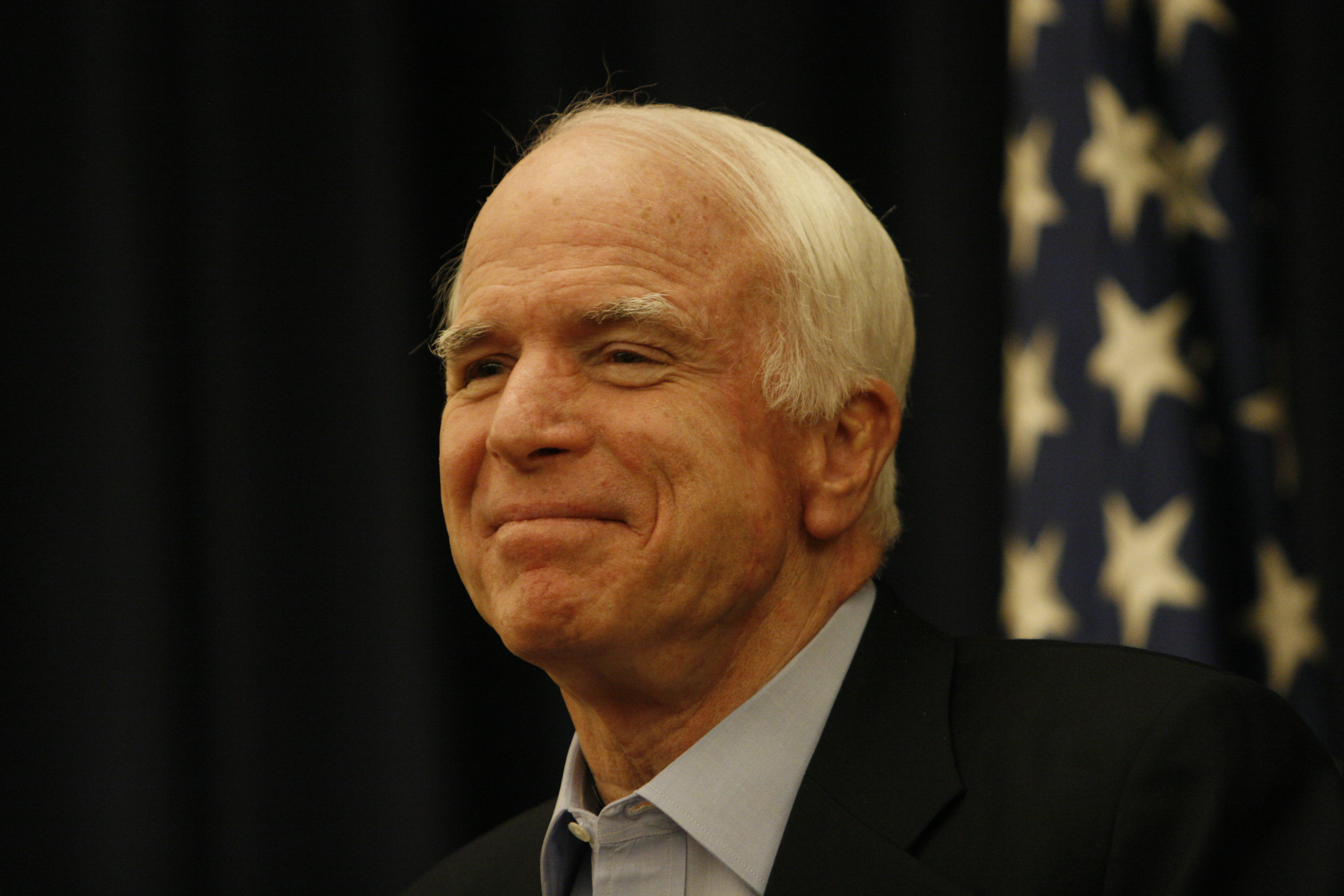
McCain in 2009.

John McCain ran for U.S. president in the 2000 presidential election, but failed to gain the Republican Party nomination, losing to George W. Bush in a campaign that included a bitter battle during the South Carolina primary. He resumed his role representing Arizona in the U.S. Senate in 2001, and Bush won the election. Bush was President of the United States from 2001 to 2009. McCain won re-election to the Senate in 2004, 2010 and 2016.

== First Bush term, 2001–2004 ==
=== Peak maverick ===
McCain's Gallup Poll favorable/unfavorable ratings, 1999–2009. Approve Disapprove No opinion

Following the 2000 presidential election, there was a large amount of lingering bitterness between George W. Bush and McCain and between their respective staffs. McCain was also upset that the Bush administration hired few if any of his aides for White House positions; an unofficial Bush policy blocked McCain staffers from thousands of administration jobs.

McCain began 2001 by taking positions opposite that of the new administration on a number of matters. In January 2001 the latest iteration of McCain-Feingold was introduced into the Senate; it was opposed by Bush and most of McCain's fellow congressional Republicans, but helped by the 2000 election results, it passed the Senate in one form until procedural obstacles delayed it again. In these few months McCain also opposed Bush on an HMO reform bill, on climate change measures, and on gun legislation. Then in May 2001, McCain voted against the Economic Growth and Tax Relief Reconciliation Act of 2001, Bush's $350 billion in tax breaks over 11 years, which became known as "the Bush tax cuts". He was one of only two Republicans to do so, saying that "I cannot in good conscience support a tax cut in which so many of the benefits go to the most fortunate among us, at the expense of middle class Americans who most need tax relief." One McCain associate later described McCain's stance during this time: "John did what he thought was right. If it happened to be something that ticked off Bush, so much the better." McCain used political capital gained from his presidential run, along with improved legislative skills, to become what The New York Times later termed "perhaps the [Senate]'s most influential member"; in doing so he built relationships with former Republican adversary Trent Lott and with high-profile Democrat Ted Kennedy.

When Republican Senator Jim Jeffords became an Independent, throwing control of the Senate to Democrats, McCain defended Jeffords against "self-appointed enforcers of party loyalty." Indeed, there was speculation at the time, and in years since, about McCain himself possibly leaving the Republican Party and becoming an Independent during the first half of 2001. Republicans then held the Senate by only one person; McCain was one of three possible defection targets, along with Jeffords and Lincoln Chafee. Accounts have differed as to who initiated any discussions, and McCain always adamantly denied, then and later, that he ever considered doing so. In any case, all of this was enough for conservative Arizonan critics of McCain to organize rallies and recalls against him in May and June 2001.

=== September 11 and afterwards ===
During the September 11, 2001 attacks, McCain was in transit to, and at, his office in the U.S. Capitol. After being evacuated, he stayed at an associate's Capitol Hill residence and made 17 national and Arizona media appearances to comment upon the attacks. In the days after, he became one of the most visible leadership voices in the nation, saying: "If there's anything Americans should know about this, it's that it's going to be a long struggle ... Americans have gotten used to quick fixes. We haven't been in a long struggle since the Vietnam War." McCain voted for the USA Patriot Act in October 2001. McCain became a supporter of Bush and an advocate for strong military measures against those responsible with respect to the U.S.-led war in Afghanistan; in a high-profile late October 2001 Wall Street Journal op-ed piece he wrote, "America is under attack by a depraved, malevolent force that opposes our every interest and hates every value we hold dear." After advocating an overwhelming, not incremental, approach against the Taliban in Afghanistan, including the use of ground forces, he concluded, "War is a miserable business. Let's get on with it." He and Democratic Senator Joe Lieberman wrote the legislation that created the 9/11 Commission, while he and Democratic Senator Fritz Hollings co-sponsored the Aviation and Transportation Security Act that federalized airport security under what became the Transportation Security Administration. On October 18, 2001, McCain stated on the Late Show with David Letterman that "There is some indication, and I don't have the conclusions, but some of this anthrax may – and I emphasize may – have come from Iraq," more than a week before ABC's series of reports identifying the composition of the anthrax samples as uniquely Iraqi, a determination then and now generally considered to be erroneous.

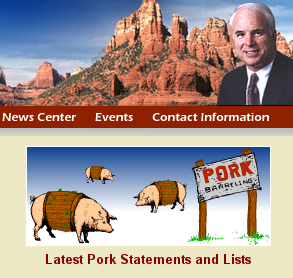
McCain's Senate web site from 2003 through 2006 prominently illustrated his concern about pork barrel spending.

McCain-Feingold had been yet further delayed by the effects of September 11. Finally in March 2002, aided by the aftereffects of the Enron scandal, it passed both House and Senate and, known formally as the Bipartisan Campaign Reform Act, was signed into law by President Bush. Bush declined to stage a White House Rose Garden signing ceremony for it, not wanting to give McCain the public satisfaction. Nevertheless, seven years in the making, it was McCain's greatest legislative achievement and had become, in the words of one biographer, "one of the most famous pieces of federal legislation in modern American political history."

Meanwhile, in discussions over proposed U.S. action against Iraq, McCain was a strong supporter of the Bush position, labeling Saddam Hussein "a megalomaniacal tyrant whose cruelty and offense to the norms of civilization are infamous." Unequivocally stating that Iraq had substantial weapons of mass destruction, McCain stated that Iraq was "a clear and present danger to the United States of America." Accordingly, he voted for the Iraq War Resolution in October 2002. Both before and immediately after the Iraq War started in March 2003, McCain agreed with the Bush administration's assertions that the U.S. forces would be treated as liberators by most of the Iraqi people. In 2003, McCain protested the USAF award of a tanker contract to Boeing to lease aircraft to replace its aging fleet of aerial tankers.

In the final quarter of 2002, McCain also proposed last minute language to amend the pending Federal anti-spam legislation that became known as the CAN-SPAM Act of 2003. McCain's office tapped anti-spam expert and attorney Anne P. Mitchell to work with his office on the language of the amendment. The McCain Amendment, as it came to be known, was included in the version of CAN-SPAM which became Federal law on January 1, 2003.

In May 2003, McCain voted against the Jobs and Growth Tax Relief Reconciliation Act of 2003, the second round of Bush tax cuts which served to extend and accelerate the first (which he had also voted against), saying it was unwise at a time of war. By November 2003, after a trip to Iraq, McCain was publicly questioning Secretary of Defense Donald Rumsfeld's handling of the Iraq War, saying that "All of the trends are in the wrong direction" and that more U.S. troops were needed to handle the deteriorating situation in the Sunni Triangle. By December 2004, McCain was bluntly announcing that he had lost confidence in Rumsfeld.

In October 2003 the McCain-Lieberman Climate Stewardship Act failed a vote in the Senate by 55 votes to 43, but would have introduced a cap and trade system of greenhouse gases at the 2000 emissions level. In 2005 it was reintroduced under the altered moniker of the Climate Change Stewardship and Innovation Act, but again failed to gather enough support; Republicans opposed the Bill 49–6, while Democrats supported it 37–10. If passed, the acts would have capped 2010 CO_{2} emissions at the 2000 level. Residential and agricultural areas, as well as other areas deemed "not feasible", would be exempt. The bill would have also established a scholarship at the National Academy of Sciences for those studying climatology.

=== 2004 elections ===
In the 2004 U.S. presidential election, McCain was once again frequently mentioned for the vice-presidential slot, only this time as part of the Democratic ticket underneath nominee John Kerry. Kerry and McCain had been close since their work on the early 1990s Senate Select Committee on POW/MIA Affairs, and the pairing was seen as having great allure to independent voters, with polls seeming to confirm the notion. McCain had seemed open such a possibility in a March 2004 interview, only to have his staff reject it hours later. In June 2004, it was reported that Kerry had informally offered the slot to McCain several times, but McCain had declined, either on grounds that it would be infeasible and weaken the presidency or that the vice-presidency held no appeal for him or that he thought Bush was a better president than Kerry would be. McCain's office formally denied that any vice-presidential offer had taken place. At the 2004 Republican National Convention, McCain enthusiastically supported Bush for re-election, praising Bush's management of the war on terror since the September 11 attacks. At the same time, McCain defended Kerry by labeling the Swift Boat Veterans for Truth campaign against Kerry's Vietnam war record as "dishonest and dishonorable" and urging the Bush campaign to condemn it. By August 2004, McCain had the best favorable-to-unfavorable rating (55 percent to 19 percent) of any national politician. In the fall general election, McCain worked very hard for Bush; Bush campaign political director Terry Nelson later said, "[McCain] was our most important surrogate."

McCain was himself up for re-election as Senator in 2004. There was some talk of Representative Jeff Flake mounting a Republican primary challenge against McCain; Stephen Moore, president of the ideologically oriented Club for Growth (which attempts to defeat those it considers Republican in Name Only), led talk for the prospect, saying "Our members loathe John McCain." Flake decided not to do it, later saying "I would have been whipped." In the general election McCain had his biggest margin of victory yet, garnering 77 percent of the vote against little-known Democrat Stuart Starky, an eighth grade math teacher whom The Arizona Republic termed a "sacrificial lamb". Exit polls showed that McCain even won a majority of the votes cast by Democrats.

Following his 2000 presidential campaign, McCain made frequent appearances on entertainment programs on television and also in film, and even more so after 2004. He hosted the October 12, 2002, episode of Saturday Night Live, making him the third U.S. Senator after Paul Simon and George McGovern, to host the show.

== Second Bush term, 2005–2008 ==
=== Presence ===
McCain was a regular guest on The Daily Show; as of 2006 he had been on that show eleven times, more than anyone else. McCain appeared in slightly edgy segments on Late Night with Conan O'Brien, and also appeared several times on The Tonight Show with Jay Leno and the Late Show with David Letterman. McCain made a brief cameo on the television show 24 in 2006 and also made a cameo in the 2005 summer movie Wedding Crashers. In more serious fare, a television film entitled Faith Of My Fathers, based on McCain's memoir of his experiences as a POW, aired on Memorial Day, 2005, on A&E. McCain was also interviewed in the 2005 documentary Why We Fight by Eugene Jarecki. McCain continued to show up on the network Sunday political talk shows Meet the Press, Face the Nation, and This Week; from 2001 to April 2008 he appeared on them a total of 152 times, much more than any other political figure.

In April 2006, McCain was named one of America's 10 Best Senators by Time magazine, which said: "McCain has earned ... moral authority over the years by being patient and making the big play. Many of the problems McCain tackles are entrenched and unexciting: they challenge the rules in Washington and the cynicism of voters at home."

Due in large part to his presidential candidacy, McCain missed over half of his Senate votes in 110th Congress through early August 2007. This was more than any other senator except Tim Johnson, who was absent for health reasons.

=== Domestic issues ===
McCain speaking in Senate against earmarking, February 2007

On judicial appointments, McCain was long a believer in judges who "would strictly interpret the Constitution." McCain drew the ire of the originalist and similar legal movements in the U.S. in May 2005, however, when he led the so-called "Gang of 14" in the Senate, which established a compromise that preserved the ability of senators to filibuster judicial nominees, but only in "extraordinary circumstances." The compromise took the steam out of the filibuster movement, but some Republicans remained disappointed that the compromise did not eliminate filibusters of judicial nominees in all circumstances. In September 2005, McCain voted to confirm John Roberts as Chief Justice of the United States, and in January 2006, voted to confirm Samuel Alito to the bench as well, later calling them "two of the finest justices ever appointed to the United States Supreme Court."

In January 2005, McCain, began his second stint as chair of the Senate Indian Affairs Committee. Working with the rest of the Arizona delegation, in late 2004 he had helped pass the Arizona Water Settlements Act, the most extensive Indian water settlement ever. He played a leading role in exposing the Jack Abramoff Indian lobbying scandal, finding money laundering, fraud, and tax violations as rival tribes lobbied for congressional favor. The investigations continued into 2006, with the committee tracing Abramoff's activities across six tribes and states. McCain spoke harshly of Abramoff: "What sets this tale apart, what makes it truly extraordinary, is the extent and degree of the apparent exploitation and deceit." Some lobbyists and other operatives aligned with McCain helped in this investigation, and benefited financially from it. In response to this and other developments regarding Indian gaming, by 2005 and 2006 McCain was pushing for amendments to the Indian Gaming Regulatory Act that would limit creation of off-reservation casinos by Indian tribes as well as limiting the movement of tribes across state borders. After McCain lost his chair position following Democrats regaining the Senate in 2007, he continued to introduce a number of Indian affairs-related legislation; overall, he had had more effect on the development of laws regarding Indian casinos than any other member of Congress.

Breaking from his 2001 and 2003 votes, McCain supported the Bush tax cut extension in May 2006, known as the Tax Increase Prevention and Reconciliation Act of 2005, saying not to do so would amount to a tax increase. The McCain-Lieberman Climate Stewardship Act was reintroduced for a third time January 2007, this time with the co-sponsorship of Barack Obama, among others. It featured a gradually reducing cap on emissions, and again failed the Senate vote, despite bipartisan support.

Working with Democratic Senator Ted Kennedy, McCain was a strong proponent of comprehensive immigration reform, which would involve legalization, guest worker programs, and border enforcement components: the Secure America and Orderly Immigration Act was never voted on in 2005, while the Comprehensive Immigration Reform Act of 2006 passed the Senate in May 2006 but then failed in the House. In June 2007, President Bush, McCain and others made the strongest push yet for such a bill, the Comprehensive Immigration Reform Act of 2007, but it aroused furious grassroots opposition among talk radio listeners and others as an "amnesty" program, and twice failed to gain cloture in the Senate and thus failed.

In 2006, Project On Government Oversight, a government watchdog group, presented McCain with its Good Government Award for his contributions to government transparency and oversight, including his investigations into the Boeing tanker lease deal and the Abramoff lobbying scandal.

=== Iraq and national security ===
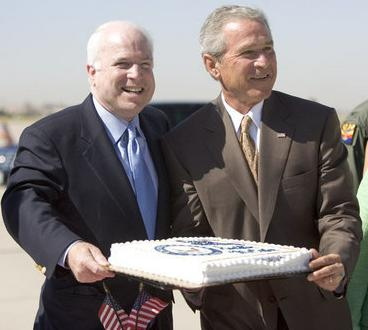
President George W. Bush presenting birthday cake to Senator McCain. Luke Air Force Base, August 29, 2005.

Owing to his time as a POW, McCain was recognized for his sensitivity to the detention and interrogation of detainees in the war on terror. McCain was an opponent of the Bush administration's use of "enhanced interrogation techniques" in the war on terror, and specifically referred to waterboarding as torture. On October 3, 2005, McCain introduced the McCain Detainee Amendment to the Defense Appropriations bill for 2005. On October 5, 2005, the United States Senate voted 90–9 to support the amendment. The amendment prohibits inhumane treatment of prisoners, including prisoners at Guantanamo Bay, by confining interrogations to the techniques in FM 34-52 Intelligence Interrogation. Although Bush had threatened to veto the bill if McCain's language was included, the President announced on December 15, 2005, that he accepted McCain's terms and would "make it clear to the world that this government does not torture and that we adhere to the international convention of torture, whether it be here at home or abroad." Bush made clear his interpretation of this legislation in a signing statement, reserving what he interpreted to be his presidential constitutional authority in order to avoid further terrorist attacks. He said that he intended to "immediately close" the Guantanamo Bay detainment camp.

In February 2008, despite his earlier statements against waterboarding, McCain voted against a ban on the technique's use by the CIA. The bill in question contained other provisions to which McCain objected, and his spokesman stated: "This wasn't a vote on waterboarding. This was a vote on applying the standards of the [Army] field manual to CIA personnel."

When the USA Patriot Act was up for renewal, McCain voted in favor of a compromise renewed act in March 2006 that gained large majority support.

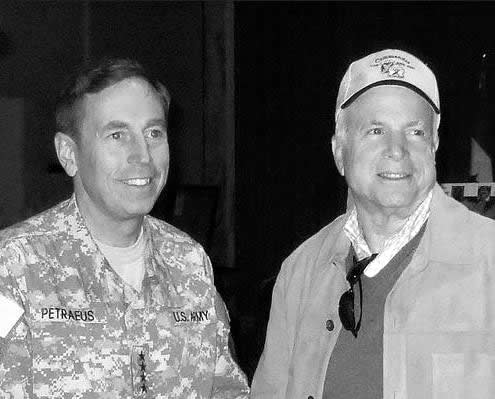
In Baghdad with General David Petraeus, November 2007.

McCain continued questioning the progress of the war in Iraq. In September 2005, he questioned Chairman of the Joint Chiefs of Staff Richard Myers' habit of optimistic outlooks on the war's progress: "Things have not gone as well as we had planned or expected, nor as we were told by you, General Myers." In August 2006 he criticized the administration for continually understating the effectiveness of the insurgency: "We [have] not told the American people how tough and difficult this could be." From the beginning McCain strongly supported the Iraq troop surge of 2007; the strategy's opponents labeled it "McCain's plan" and University of Virginia political science professor Larry Sabato said, "McCain owns Iraq just as much as Bush does now." The surge and the war were quite unpopular during most of the year, even within the Republican Party, as McCain's presidential campaign was underway; faced with the consequences, McCain frequently responded, "I would much rather lose a campaign than a war." In January 2008, when a questioner said, "President Bush has talked about our staying in Iraq for 50 years," McCain responded, "Make it a hundred. We've been in Japan for 60 years, we've been in South Korea for 50 years or so. That'd be fine with me as long as Americans are not being injured or harmed or wounded or killed. That's fine with me. I hope it will be fine with you if we maintain a presence in a very volatile part of the world where Al Qaeda is training, recruiting, equipping, and motivating people every single day."

In spring 2008, McCain engaged in legislative conflict with fellow Naval Academy graduate and Vietnam veteran Jim Webb, regarding the latter's Post-9/11 Veterans Educational Assistance Act. McCain thought it too bureaucratic and that it would weaken retention of service members, and proposed alternate legislation instead.

== During presidency of Obama ==
=== Remainder of 2008 ===
During August 2008, Republic of Georgia launched a large scale military offensive against Russia backed South Ossetia, triggered a five-day-long Russia-Georgia war, results in a disastrous Georgia defeat. McCain, a fervent supporter of president of Georgia, spoke during a gathering "thoughts and prayers and support of the American people are with that brave little nation as they struggle today for their freedom and independence.... that I know I speak for every American when I say to him today, we are all Georgians."

Following his defeat in the 2008 presidential general election, McCain returned to the Senate amid varying views about what role he might play there. Some Republicans criticized his campaign for incompetency, and his lack of a Republican leadership position in the senate might hamper his effectiveness. On the other hand, he was well-positioned to be an influential bridge between the Obama administration and the Republican side of the senate on issues that he and Obama had agreement on.

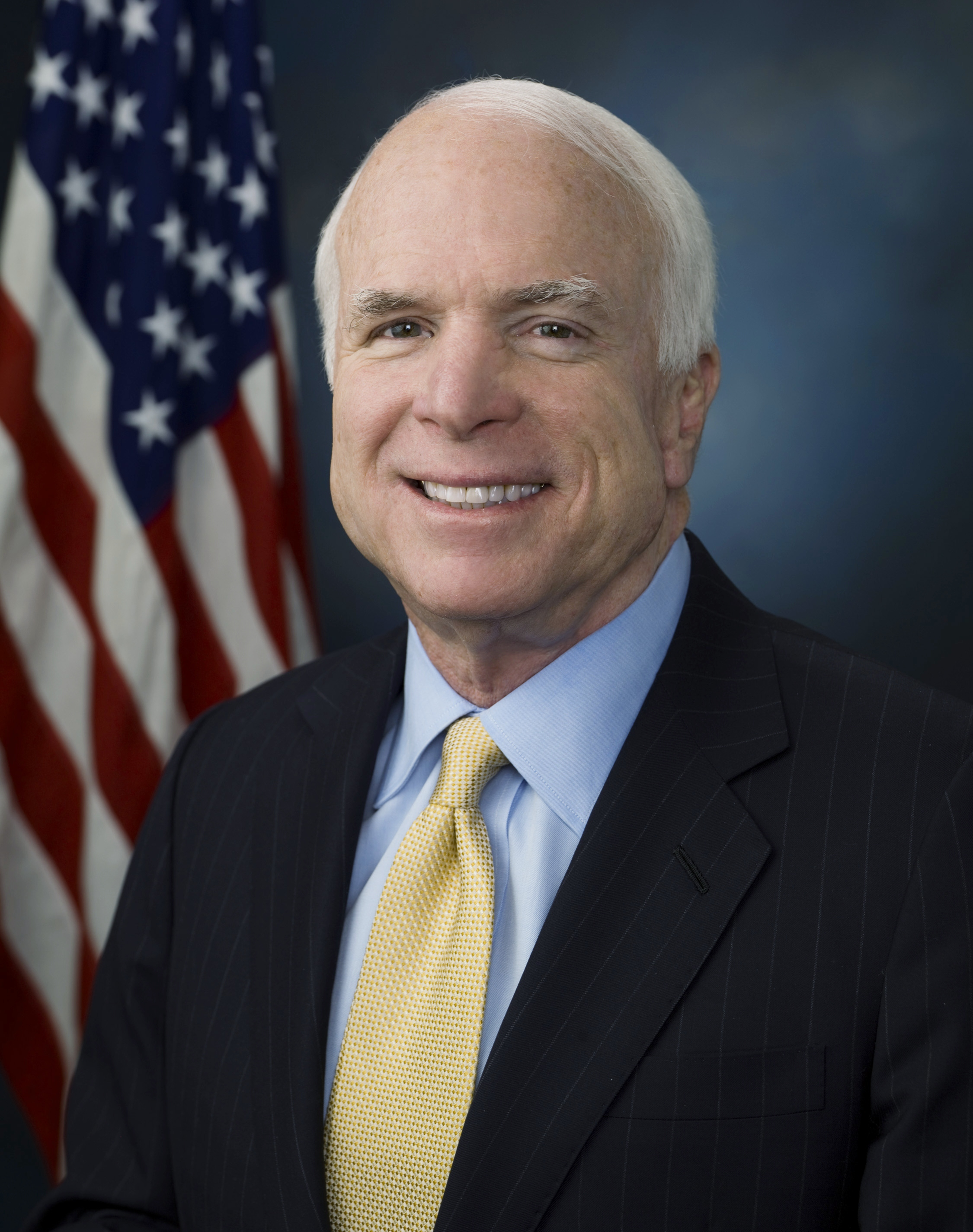
McCain's official 2009 portrait

In mid-November 2008 he met with President-elect Obama, and the two discussed some of those issues, among other matters. Around the same time, McCain indicated that he intended to run for re-election to his Senate seat in 2010. Whether he would face serious Democratic opposition in 2010 would depend largely on whether popular Arizona Governor Janet Napolitano, whose term-limited time in office would expire after 2010, would accept a position in the Obama Cabinet or not. Napolitano did, and in February 2009 McCain began active fundraising efforts for his re-election campaign. In April 2009 McCain gained an announced Republican primary opponent for 2010 in Minuteman Civil Defense Corps co-founder Chris Simcox. Simcox stated that "John McCain has failed miserably in his duty to secure this nation's borders and protect the people of Arizona from the escalating violence and lawlessness. ... Coupled with his votes for reckless bailout spending and big government solutions to our nation's problems, John McCain is out of touch with everyday Arizonans. Enough is enough."

In December 2008, McCain cautioned against Republicans trying to exploit the Rod Blagojevich corruption scandal, saying that working together to solve the nation's economic crises was more important. Regarding a possible presidential candidacy in 2012 by his former running mate Sarah Palin, McCain demurred, praising her effect on his own campaign but saying "at this stage ... my corpse is still warm, you know?" McCain added that he was over feeling sorry for himself about the campaign: "But the point is: You've got to move on ... I'm still a senator from the state of Arizona. I still have the privilege and honor of serving this country, which I've done all my life, and it's a great honor to do so." (Several months later, McCain would still decline to commit his support to Palin, saying he would want her to "compete" and that the Republicans had other "good, fresh talent".)

=== 2009 ===
As the 111th Congress began, McCain returned to some of his past legislative themes, joining with old partner Russ Feingold to introduce bills limiting earmarks and re-proposing the line item veto. In late January 2009, following the controversial processes in the New York senate appointment and Illinois senate appointments, McCain teamed with Feingold and Alaska Senator Mark Begich to sponsor a proposed constitutional amendment that would call for Senate vacancies to always be filled by special election rather than being initially filled by gubernatorial appointment. However, in general McCain did not have a lengthy set of legislation he was interested in pushing. Also in January 2009, McCain announced the creation of a new political action committee, the Country First PAC. McCain kept a low profile otherwise, and declined to talk much about the campaign or about his thoughts on running mate Sarah Palin, who was much in the news reflecting on the media portrayal she had gained during the campaign.

Meanwhile, Obama consulted with McCain on a variety of matters, including nominations to top national security posts and McCain's perceptions from a trip to Pakistan and Iraq. The initial "good blood" between them was something rarely seen between a president-elect and his defeated rival. President Obama's inauguration speech contained an echo of one of McCain's favorite themes, the importance that people have "a willingness to find meaning in something greater than themselves."

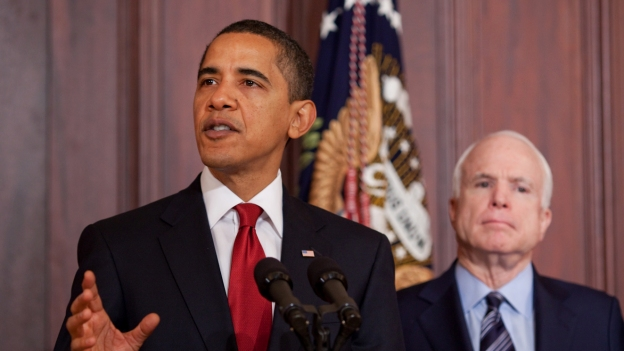
Senator McCain listening to President Obama speak about government contracting reform in March 2009

Regarding the Obama economic stimulus package of 2009, McCain said "I think we are clearly prepared to sit down, discuss, negotiate a true stimulus package that will create jobs," but opposed the package as proposed by the White House on the grounds that it incorporated federal policy changes that had nothing to do with near-term job creation. McCain emerged as a chief opponent of the package in subsequent discussions, and continued to oppose it even after it was reduced in scope to gain the support of a group of centrist Republicans and Democrats, saying, "We want to stimulate the economy, not mortgage the future of our children and grandchildren by the kind of fiscally profligate spending embodied in this legislation." McCain continued his opposition to the final version of the bill that passed, saying it represented "generational theft" and complaining that a truly bipartisan approach was not taken towards forming the bill. In early March, McCain helped defeat a version of the Obama administration's Omnibus Appropriations Act of 2009, on grounds of earmarks.

Overall, McCain was both supporting and opposing the Obama administration in its early days: "I'm the, as I said, loyal opposition. And both words, I think, are operative." The New York Times opined that McCain was "rewriting the part of presidential loser."

McCain joined Representative Peter T. King of New York in an effort to call for a posthumous pardon for boxing legend Jack Johnson. Johnson was convicted in 1913 for violating the Mann Act in a case that was seen as disapproval of Johnson's relationship with a white woman. McCain supported Secretary of Defense Robert Gates' proposed weapons systems cuts, saying "It has long been necessary to shift spending away from weapon systems plagued by scheduling and cost overruns to ones that strike the correct balance between the needs of our deployed forces and the requirements for meeting the emerging threats of tomorrow." Many other Republicans opposed these changes. In April 2009, McCain made yet another return visit to Hoa Lo Prison in Vietnam and advocated for stronger military relations between the two nations, as a counterweight to Chinese presence in the South China Sea.

In May 2009, John and Cindy McCain attended the graduation of their son John S. "Jack" McCain IV from the Naval Academy, the fourth generation of John S. McCains to do so. President Obama spoke at the ceremony and gave the new graduate an extra congratulatory gesture.

However, as time went on, it became clear that McCain was less a maverick and more part of the unified Republican opposition to the Obama administration's initiatives. In part this was because the large Democratic majority in the Senate made them less open to deal-making with Republicans on some issues, in part because McCain was still concerned about a primary challenge from a conservative, and in part because McCain still had an edge left over from the campaign. The departure of several key Senate staffers following the campaign may have also been a factor. Advisor Mark McKinnon said, "A lot of people, including me, thought he might be the Republican building bridges to the Obama Administration. But he's been more like the guy blowing up the bridges."

In June 2009, McCain criticized Obama for not taking a stronger public stance regarding the disputed Iranian presidential election: "People are being killed and beaten in the streets of Tehran and all over Iran, and we should stand up for them." McCain allied with Obama and U.S. Defense Secretary Robert Gates in co-sponsoring an amendment to remove additional production of the F-22 Raptor from a Senate military authorization bill in July 2009. After the removal succeeded, McCain said in reference to defense procurement, "[this] really means there's a chance of us changing the way we do business in Washington."

By August 2009, McCain had over 1.1 million followers of his Twitter account. He called Twitter "a phenomenal way of communicating." He also continued to appear frequently on one of his favorite platforms of the past, the Sunday morning network news interview shows. The same month, McCain voted against confirmation of Obama's Supreme Court nominee Sonia Sotomayor; after being undecided for a long time, he eventually said, "There is no doubt that Judge Sotomayor has the professional background and qualifications that one hopes for in a Supreme Court nominee.... [but] I do not believe that she shares my belief in judicial restraint." Through this point in 2009, McCain had sided with the Republican Party in closely divided votes more often than he had during any point of his senatorial career. Following fellow Senator Edward M. Kennedy's death towards the end of the month, McCain spoke at his friend's wake, recalling their sometime battles in the Senate which would be followed by "that infectious laugh of his that could wake the dead and cheer up the most beleaguered soul. The place won't be the same without him." McCain opposed Obama's health care plan, the Patient Protection and Affordable Care Act, saying "Americans have made it abundantly clear that they do not want government taking over their health-care decisions." He also opposed bipartisan efforts to forge a climate change bill, despite having made a name for himself earlier in the decade with similar proposals and despite his frequent allies Lindsey Graham and Joe Lieberman being present in the effort. In November 2009, Senator McCain also joined with many of his Republican colleagues in the first failed filibuster against an Obama judicial nominee, David Hamilton. Two of the Republicans, McCain and Lindsey Graham, had been members of the "Gang of 14"; McCain did not explain his vote in terms of the "extraordinary circumstances" clause of that agreement, but Graham said Hamilton's views were "so far removed from the mainstream" that a vote against cloture was warranted.

In September 2009, as the debate about the proper U.S. course of action in the Afghanistan War grew, McCain wrote with colleagues Lindsey Graham and Joe Lieberman that: "Growing numbers of Americans are starting to doubt whether we should have troops in Afghanistan and whether the war there is even winnable. We are confident that not only is it winnable, but that we have no choice. We must prevail in Afghanistan." McCain told Obama at an October 2009 meeting at the White House that he should make a decision quickly and not engage in a "leisurely process", which brought rebukes from Obama and Senator Carl Levin. A month later, he said he was "angry" and "disappointed" with President Obama for not having yet made a decision on whether troop levels in Afghanistan should be ramped up. He also harshly criticized Obama for scrapping construction of the US missile defense complex in Poland.

Making reference to the 2009 general election campaign season and upcoming 2010 congressional elections, McCain made efforts to shape the Republican Party in a way that would support not just conservatives but also conservative pragmatists and moderates. This is a context in which Glenn Beck and other media voices and groups were tending to push the Republicans in a more purist ideological direction. In November 2009, publication of Palin's memoir Going Rogue: An American Life sparked much public discussion of her complaints against the McCain campaign, but he said, "I've moved on, I'm proud of everybody in the campaign, I'm proud of her. I've got a state with the second worst economy in the nation, and that's what my work and focus is on."

=== 2010 and Senatorial re-election campaign ===
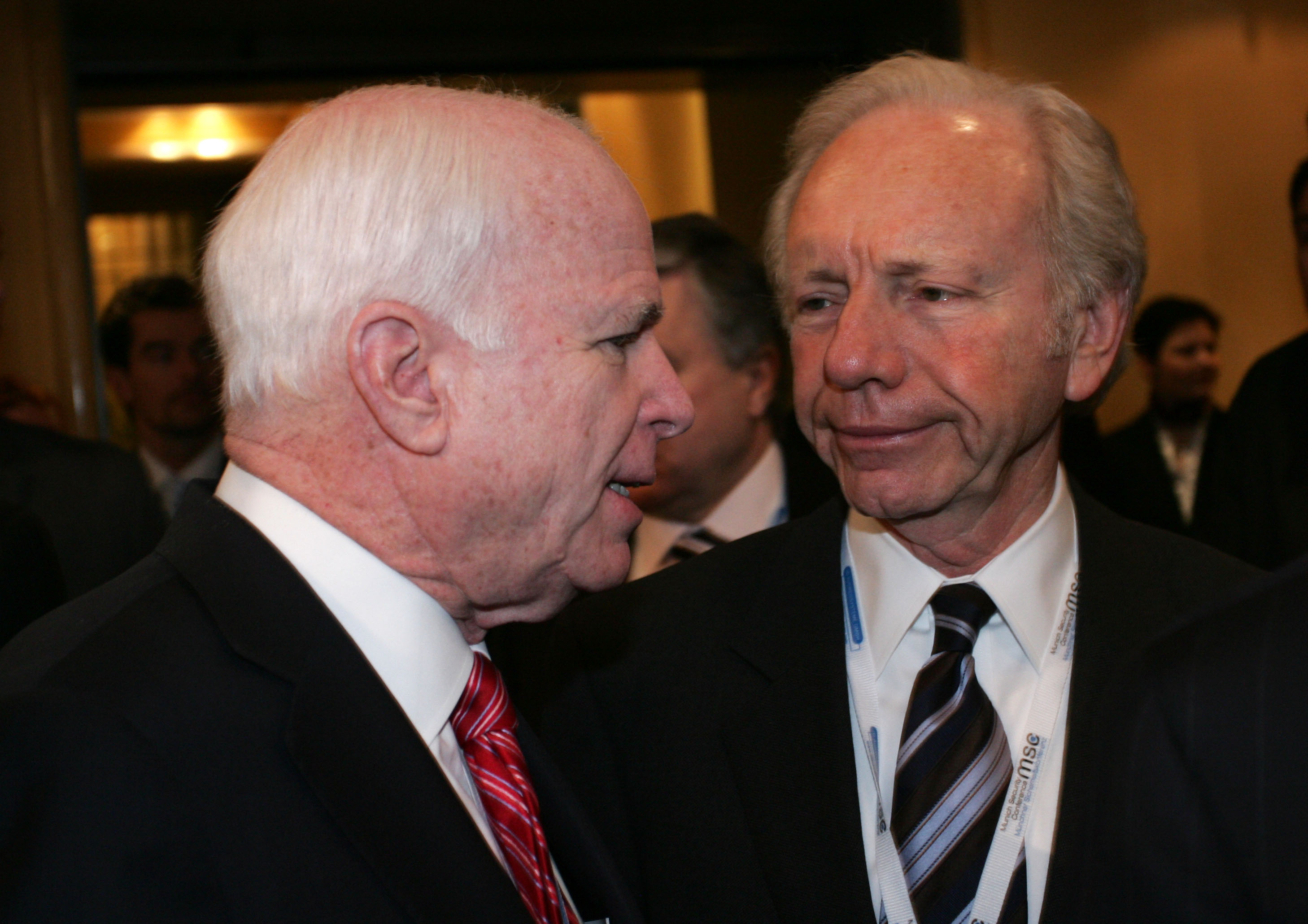
Senators McCain and Joe Lieberman at the Munich Conference on Security Policy in February 2010

In its January 2010 Citizens United v. Federal Election Commission decision, the Supreme Court ruled unconstitutional a central element of McCain-Feingold, that which limited corporations and unions from candidate-related advertising in the closing period of an election. In response, McCain said, "I am disappointed by the decision of the Supreme Court and the lifting of the limits on corporate and union contributions." His muted reaction compared to Feingold's was in the context of virtually all other Republicans exulting in the court's decision.

A November 2009 Rasmussen Reports poll had surprisingly shown that former Congressman J. D. Hayworth was nearly even with McCain among likely Republican Party primary voters in the state, indicating that a primary challenge might be a serious danger to McCain. Hayworth's February 2010 declaration of entry into the Arizona senate led Simcox to drop his campaign and endorse Hayworth, saying that he wanted to present a united conservative front against McCain. The primary challenge helped account for McCain's sometimes awkward reversals or mutings of past stances on issues such as the bank bailouts, national security, campaign finance reform, creation of a national debt commission, and gays in the military. Hayworth said, "John is undergoing a campaign conversion." The changes were pronounced enough to cause Newsweek's David Margolick to write: "His dramatic shifts raise several questions: How much of his maverick persona over the years has been real and how much simply tactical? Is he in the midst of some struggle for his soul, or is this evolution simply the latest example, dating back to his days at the Hanoi Hilton, of McCain doing whatever it takes to survive? Is the anger people sense in him anger at Obama, or the American electorate, or fate, or himself? And if, as seems likely, John McCain goes on to serve another term, which John McCain will it be?"

With Hayworth using the campaign slogan "The Consistent Conservative", McCain backed off his reputation for unorthodoxy, saying (despite his own past use of the term), "I never considered myself a maverick. I consider myself a person who serves the people of Arizona to the best of his abilities." McCain sought to repair the many breaches with state party officials that had occurred over the years. Despite being opposed by elements of the Tea Party movement (while other elements declined to endorse either candidate), McCain remained strong among party centrists and independents, and had solid financial resources. Sarah Palin staged a campaign appearance with him in March 2010 and said that McCain was deserving of support among Tea Party movement types, although many in the crowd came to see her rather than him and were unsure of who they would vote for in the primary.

When the Patient Protection and Affordable Care Act, finally passed Congress and became law in March 2010, McCain strongly opposed the landmark legislation not only on its merits but also on the way it had been handled in Congress. As a consequence, he warned that congressional Republicans would not be working with Democrats on anything else: "There will be no cooperation for the rest of the year. They have poisoned the well in what they've done and how they've done it." In response, White House Press Secretary Robert Gibbs compared McCain to a six-year-old child who wants to take his toys and go home. McCain subsequently backed off that stance as it related to matters of national security. McCain supported Arizona SB1070, which gained national attention as attracted national attention as the broadest and strictest anti-illegal immigration measure in decades within the United States, only hours before its passage in April 2010, then became a vocal defender of the nationally controversial measure, saying that the state had been forced to take action given the federal government's inability to control the border.

Hayworth's campaign began to struggle when infomercials he had made in 2007 came to light, which had pitched access to free government payment programs from a company that was accused of swindling thousands of people. McCain ran television ads that labelled Hayworth a "huckster", and in return Hayworth's wife charged McCain with engaging in deliberate character assassination. Hayworth also had difficulty rallying conservative backing due to his past support for congressional earmarks and for his past associations with lobbyist Jack Abramoff. McCain spent about $20 million on the campaign, vastly exceeding the expenditures of his opponent. In the August 24 primary, McCain beat Hayworth by a 56 to 32 percent margin.

In September 2010, McCain led a successful filibuster of the National Defense Authorization Act for Fiscal Year 2011, which included a measure to allow repeal of the "Don't ask, don't tell" law regarding gays in the military. McCain said that the debate on "Don't ask, don't tell" should wait until a Department of Defense survey on the views of the military towards repeal of it was published and that efforts to attach amendments to the authorization were politically motivated by the upcoming midterm elections. The dispute over the repeal threatened to prevent the authorization bill from passing for the first time since 1952.

On November 2, 2010, McCain easily defeated Democratic city councilman Rodney Glassman in the general election to win a fifth term in the U.S. Senate. McCain took 59 percent of the vote as against Glassman's 35 percent.

During the lame duck session of the 111th Congress, McCain opposed many of the high-profile legislative measures supported by Obama. He did vote for the Tax Relief, Unemployment Insurance Reauthorization, and Job Creation Act of 2010, a compromise worked out between the president and the Republican leadership that centered around extending the Bush tax cuts for two years, saying it contained "unneeded, unnecessary, unwanted sweeteners" and that "I'll vote for it, but it's not what the people said they wanted done on November 2nd." But he voted against the DREAM Act, legislation that he had initially sponsored; it failed 55–41 to gain cloture. He voted against ratification of the New START treaty, which succeeded on a 71–26 vote. He played a role in getting the large omnibus spending bill for the forthcoming year defeated. Most prominently, he continued to lead the losing fight against "Don't ask, don't tell" repeal, despite the military study he had been waiting for generally casting repeal in a positive light. In his opposition, he sometimes fell into anger or hostility on the Senate floor. The repeal passed by a 65–31 vote, and McCain invoked culture war images – "Today is a very sad day. There will be high-fives over all the liberal bastions of America, [from] the elite schools that bar military recruiters from campus [to] the salons of Georgetown." – and warned of dire consequences: "Don't think that it won't be at great cost ... [it will] probably harm the battle effectiveness which is so vital to the survival of our young men and women in the military." In general, McCain was critical of the session, saying the measures Obama was pushing were against the will of the people and that "this bizarro world that the majority leader has been carrying us in [maybe] will require another election."

=== 2011 ===
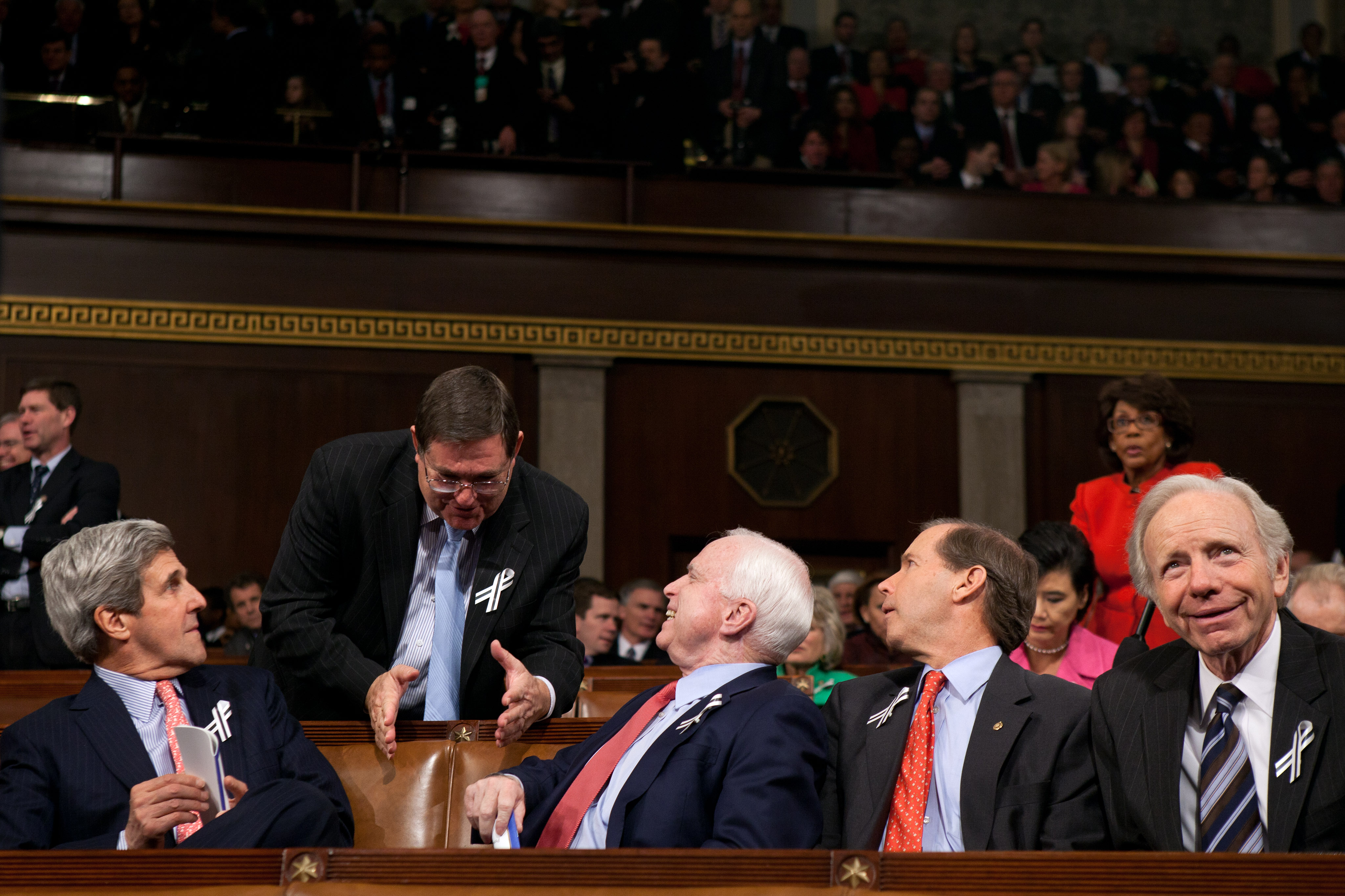
McCain with fellow members of Congress John Kerry, Michael C. Burgess, Tom Udall, and Joe Lieberman before the 2011 State of the Union Address.

McCain was sworn into his fifth term as U.S. Senator on January 3, 2011. While control of the House of Representatives went over to the Republicans, the Senate stayed Democratic and McCain continued to be the ranking member of the Senate Armed Services Committee. McCain also continued to be a frequent guest on the Sunday morning talk shows.

As the Arab Spring took center stage in the early parts of 2011, McCain urged that embattled Egyptian President Hosni Mubarak step down, and urged the U.S. to push for democratic reforms in the region despite the associated risks of religious extremists gaining power: "The best opportunity for a pro-democracy government and not a radical, Islamic government is an open, transparent process." McCain said that overall, "These winds of change are blowing," and might spread to Russia and China as well. As the 2011 Libyan civil war took place, McCain was one of the strongest congressional supporters of the 2011 military intervention in Libya by the U.S., NATO, and other countries. In April 2011 he staged a visit to the Anti-Gaddafi forces and the National Transitional Council in Benghazi, the highest-ranking American to do so. There he said, "They are my heroes," and urged that they receive weapons, training, and ground-air support, although not necessarily all from the U.S. Following the successful May 2011 U.S. mission to kill Osama bin Laden, McCain congratulated Obama and the U.S. forces involved and said that "advanced interrogation" methods had not measurably helped produce the information that led knowledge of to the terrorist leader's whereabouts.

McCain voted for the Budget Control Act of 2011 that resolved the United States debt ceiling crisis in August 2011. He said he would do this despite "probably hav[ing] to swallow hard" due to the chance of significant defense spending cuts coming out of the process.

In November 2011, as part of the National Defense Authorization Act for Fiscal Year 2012 (the bill to fund the U.S. military), McCain and Senator Carl Levin initially proposed to permit the indefinite detention of American citizens by the U.S. military, without charges or trial, solely on grounds of suspected terrorist activity. After objections were raised that such detention would violate Americans' constitutional rights, McCain agreed to include language specifically exempting American citizens.

=== 2012 ===
In the 2012 Republican Party presidential primaries, McCain endorsed former rival Mitt Romney on the eve of the January 2012 New Hampshire primary. McCain subsequently campaigned for him, but compared the contest overall to a Greek tragedy due to its drawn-out nature with massive Super PAC-funded attack ads damaging all the contenders and risking that the eventual victor would be thus less effective in the general election against President Obama. He returned to emphasizing one of his trademark themes, labelling the Supreme Court's 2010 Citizens United v. Federal Election Commission decision as "uninformed, arrogant, naïve" in June 2012, adding that "I think there will be scandals associated with the worst decision of the United States Supreme Court in the 21st century." He had filed an amicus curiae brief with the Supreme Court as part of the case Western Tradition Partnership, Inc. v. Attorney General of Montana that sought to limit or fully overturn Citizens United, but it was summarily rejected by the court. He continued to campaign for Romney and for Republican Senate candidates in the general election, hoping to become chair of the Armed Services Committee if the Republicans took control of that body, but in fact Romney lost to Obama and the Republicans lost further seats to the Democrats in the Senate.

During 2012, McCain took the lead in fighting looming defense spending sequestrations brought on by the Budget Control Act of 2011, appearing in town-hall meetings to argue they must be prevented. He gained attention for defending State Department aide Huma Abedin against charges brought by Congresswoman Michele Bachmann and a few House Republicans that she had ties to the Muslim Brotherhood, saying "These allegations about Huma and the report from which they are drawn are nothing less than an unwarranted and unfounded attack on an honorable woman, a dedicated American and a loyal public servant... The letter and the report offer not one instance of an action, a decision or a public position that Huma has taken while at the State Department that would lend credence to the charge that she is promoting anti-American activities within our government... These attacks on Huma have no logic, no basis and no merit. And they need to stop now." He continued to be one of the most frequently appearing guests on the Sunday morning news talk shows, had an improved relationship with Senate Minority Leader Mitch McConnell, and gradually regained his spirit, if not his full maverick persona, after his 2008 loss, saying "It took me three years of feeling sorry for myself." He became one of the most vocal critics of the Obama administration's handling of the September 11, 2012, attack on the U.S. diplomatic mission in Benghazi, saying it was a "debacle" that featured either "a massive cover-up or incompetence that is not acceptable" and that it was worse than the Watergate scandal. As part of this, he vowed to block any nomination of UN Ambassador Susan Rice to Secretary of State. McCain gained some attention when he missed an intelligence briefing on the Benghazi attack in order to hold a press conference calling for a Watergate-style select committee to investigate the circumstances around the attack. An aide later ascribed the missed briefing to a scheduling error. The efforts of him and others against a Rice nomination proved effective; in mid-December, she withdrew her name from consideration, and Obama then nominated McCain's colleague and friend, Senator John Kerry, for the position instead.

=== 2013 ===
In early 2013, McCain engaged in tough questioning of former friend and colleague Chuck Hagel's nomination to be U.S. Secretary of Defense, telling the nominee he had been on the wrong side of history for opposing the Iraq surge. In the end, McCain voted against Hagel's confirmation, but before that opposed a filibuster against the nomination, thus clearing the way for Hagel to be confirmed by a 58–41 vote.

Throughout 2013, McCain decried Republican isolationist – or at least non-interventionist – drift, exemplified by his March 2013 comment that Senators Rand Paul and Ted Cruz and Representative Justin Amash were "wacko birds" and by his April 2013 remark that "there are times these days when I feel that I have more in common on foreign policy with President Obama than I do with some in my own party." In May 2013, McCain made an unannounced trip to Syria in the midst of Syrian civil war, crossing the border near Kilis in Turkey. McCain, a vocal proponent of U.S. military intervention in the conflict on the side of the anti-government forces, met with General Salim Idris of the Free Syrian Army and others. He called for arming them with heavy weapons and for the establishment of a no-fly zone over the country. Following reports that two of the people he posed for pictures with had been responsible for the kidnapping of eleven Lebanese Shiite pilgrims the year before, McCain disputed one of the identifications and said he had not met directly with the other. Following the 2013 Ghouta chemical weapons attack, McCain argued again for strong American military action against the government of Syrian President Bashar al-Assad, and complained that the action the Obama administration was contemplating might just be a "pinprick". In early September 2013, after meeting with Obama at the White House, he indicated support for Obama's request to Congress that it authorize a military response, saying "If the Congress were to reject a resolution like this, after the president of the United States has already committed to action, the consequences would be catastrophic, in that the credibility of this country with friends and adversaries alike would be shredded. And there would be not only implications for this president, but for future presidencies as well." and in September 2013 indicated support for Obama's request to Congress that it authorize a military response. He then cast a Foreign Relations committee vote in favor of authorizing a military response.

During 2013, McCain was a member of a bi-partisan group of senators, the "Gang of Eight", which announced principles for another try at comprehensive immigration reform. The resulting Border Security, Economic Opportunity, and Immigration Modernization Act of 2013 passed the Senate by a 68–32 margin, but faced an uncertain future in the House. In July 2013, McCain was at the forefront of an agreement among senators to drop filibusters against Obama administration executive nominees without Democrats resorting to the "nuclear option" that would disallow such filibusters altogether.

These developments and some other negotiations showed that McCain now had improved relations with the Obama administration, including the president himself, as well as with Democratic Senate Majority Leader Harry Reid and veteran Democratic Senator Charles Schumer. Indeed, McCain had become the leader of a power center in the Senate for cutting deals in an otherwise bitterly partisan environment. They also led some observers to conclude that the "maverick" McCain had returned. When, in November 2013, Reid went ahead and imposed the "nuclear option" for most presidential nominations anyway, McCain intoned against the action with many words, saying it was a "black chapter in the history of the Senate," but still remained on a friendly basis with Reid.

McCain was publicly skeptical about the Republican strategy that precipitated the U.S. federal government shutdown of 2013 and U.S. debt-ceiling crisis of 2013 in order to defund or delay the Affordable Care Act, saying, "Republicans have to understand we have lost this battle, as I predicted weeks ago, that we would not be able to win because we were demanding something that was not achievable." In October 2013, he voted in favor of the Continuing Appropriations Act, 2014, which ended the shutdown and raised, at least for a few months, the debt ceiling. He said, "We are now seeing the end of this agonizing odyssey that this body has been put through, but far more importantly, the American people have been put through. It's one of the more shameful chapters that I have seen in the years that I have spent here in the U.S. Senate." In December 2013, McCain was one of nine Republican senators to vote in favor of the Bipartisan Budget Act of 2013, the compromise spending-and-budget bill negotiated by Senator Patty Murray and Representative Paul Ryan.

=== 2014 ===
In January 2014, the Arizona Republican Party formally censured McCain for what they saw as a liberal record that had been "disastrous and harmful". The action had no practical effect but showed that McCain's being criticized at the state level as insufficiently conservative was still ongoing.

McCain remained stridently opposed to many aspects of Obama's foreign policy, and in June 2014, following the major gains by the Islamic State in Iraq and the Levant in the 2014 Northern Iraq offensive, he decried what he saw as a U.S. failure to protect its past gains in Iraq and called on the president's entire national security team to resign. McCain said, "Could all this have been avoided? ... The answer is absolutely yes. If I sound angry it's because I am angry." McCain continued to be active on foreign policy issues, including a trip to India in 2014 that was overshadowed by the NSA spying he had spoken out on.

Following the 2014 Senate elections that saw the Republicans retake the majority, McCain was predicted to become the new Chairman of the Senate Committee on Armed Services.

In late 2014, McCain led the opposition to the political appointments of Colleen Bell, Noah Mamet, and George Tsunis to the ambassadorships in Hungary, Argentina, and Norway, respectively. McCain labelled Bell and Mamet's successful confirmation vote on December 2 as "disgraceful". In his criticism of Bell in a speech on the Senate floor, McCain said that it was a "serious mistake" to send the "totally unqualified" Bell (who is a Hollywood soap opera producer and key financial bundler for Obama and the Democrats) to Hungary in a time when Hungary "is on the verge of ceding its sovereignty to a neo-fascist dictator getting into bed with Vladimir Putin." A McCain spokesman later confirmed that the "neo-fascist dictator" was the Hungarian Prime Minister, Viktor Orbán, who had been accused by the Hungarian opposition and certain international figures of having authoritarian and pro-Russian tendencies. The government of Hungary condemned McCain's remarks and summoned the U.S. Embassy Chargé d'Affaires in an act of protest. Deputy spokesperson Marie Harf, during the daily press briefing announced that "I think it's no surprise that there are a number of views Senator McCain has espoused that we don't share. ... Obviously, we express concerns when we have them. I wouldn't share the same words that Senator McCain did."

== During presidency of Trump ==
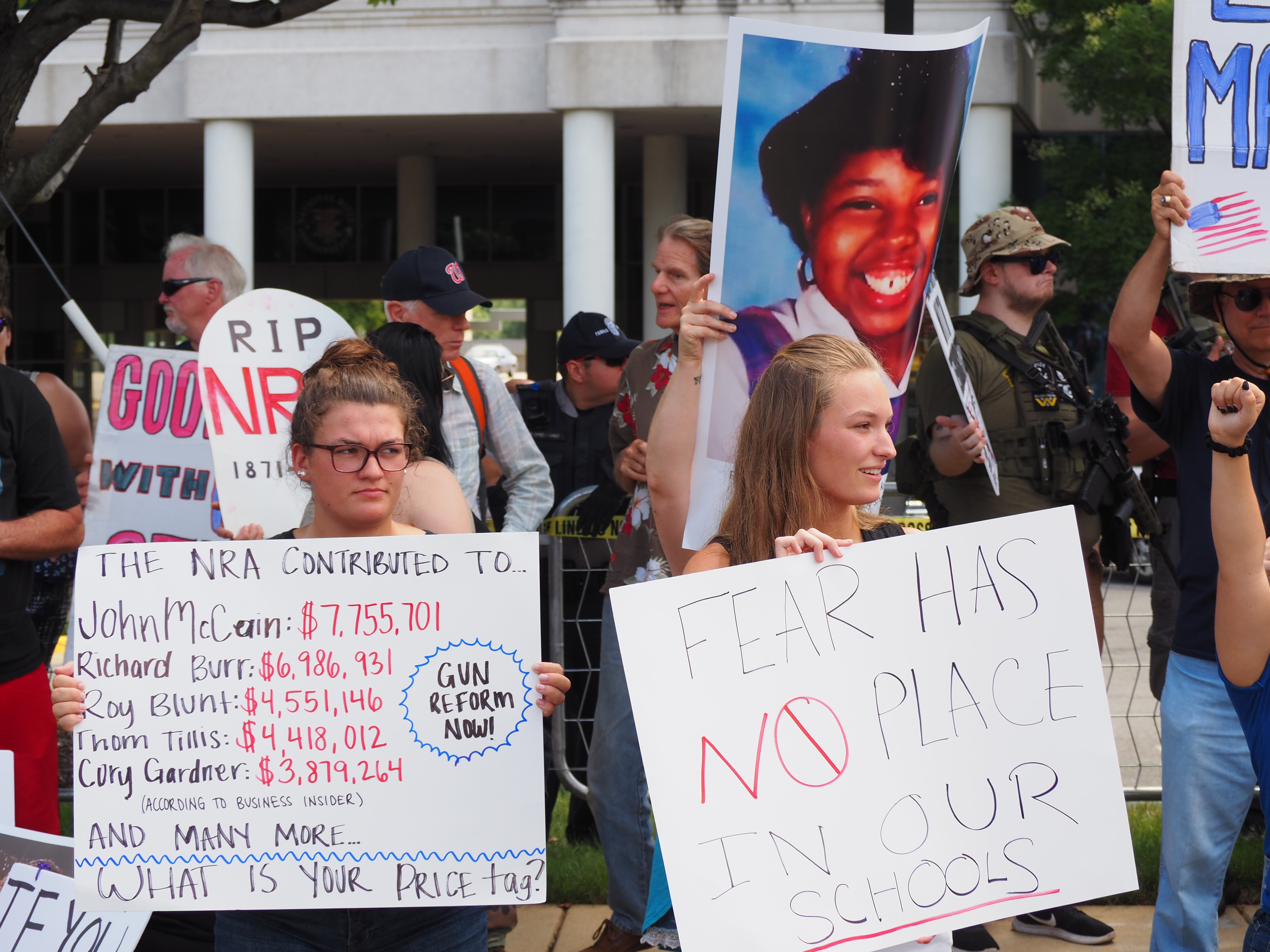
The National March on the NRA in August 2018. The National Rifle Association of America spent $7.74 million to support John McCain.

McCain chaired the January 5, 2017, hearing of the Senate Armed Services Committee where Republican and Democratic senators and intelligence officers, including James R. Clapper Jr., the Director of National Intelligence, Michael S. Rogers, the head of the National Security Agency and United States Cyber Command presented a "united front" that "forcefully reaffirmed the conclusion that the Russian government used hacking and leaks to try to influence the presidential election."

In June 2017, McCain voted to support President Trump's controversial arms deal with Saudi Arabia.

Repeal and replacement of Obamacare (the Patient Protection and Affordable Care Act) was a centerpiece of McCain's 2016 re-election campaign, and in July 2017, he said, "Have no doubt: Congress must replace Obamacare, which has hit Arizonans with some of the highest premium increases in the nation and left 14 of Arizona's 15 counties with only one provider option on the exchanges this year." He added that he supports affordable and quality health care, but objected that the pending Senate bill did not do enough to shield the Medicaid system in Arizona.

In response to the death of Chinese Nobel Peace Prize laureate Liu Xiaobo, who died of organ failure while in government custody, McCain said that "this is only the latest example of Communist China's assault on human rights, democracy, and freedom."

In September 2017, as the Rohingya crisis in Myanmar became ethnic cleansing of the Rohingya Muslim minority, McCain announced moves to scrap planned future military cooperation with Myanmar.

In October 2017, McCain praised President Trump's decision to decertify Iran's compliance with the Iran nuclear deal (JCPOA) while not yet withdrawing the U.S. from the agreement, saying that the Obama-era policy failed "to meet the multifaceted threat Iran poses. The goals President Trump presented in his speech today are a welcomed long overdue change."

=== Brain tumor diagnosis and surgery ===
McCain returns to the Senate for the first time following his cancer diagnosis and delivers remarks on July 25, 2017, after casting a crucial vote on the American Health Care Act.

On July 14, 2017, McCain underwent a minimally invasive craniotomy at Mayo Clinic Hospital in Phoenix, Arizona, to remove a blood clot above his left eye. His absence prompted Senate Majority Leader Mitch McConnell to delay a vote on the Better Care Reconciliation Act. Five days later, Mayo Clinic doctors announced that the laboratory results from the surgery confirmed the presence of a glioblastoma, which is a very aggressive cancerous brain tumor. Standard treatment options for this tumor include chemotherapy and radiation, although even with treatment, average survival time is approximately 14 months. McCain was a survivor of previous cancers, including melanoma.

President Donald Trump publicly wished Senator McCain well, as did many others, including former president Obama. On July 19, McCain's senatorial office issued a statement that he "appreciates the outpouring of support he has received over the last few days. He is in good spirits as he continues to recover at home with his family in Arizona. He is grateful to the doctors and staff at Mayo Clinic for their outstanding care, and is confident that any future treatment will be effective." On July 24, McCain announced via Twitter that he would return to the United States Senate the following day.

=== Return to the Senate ===
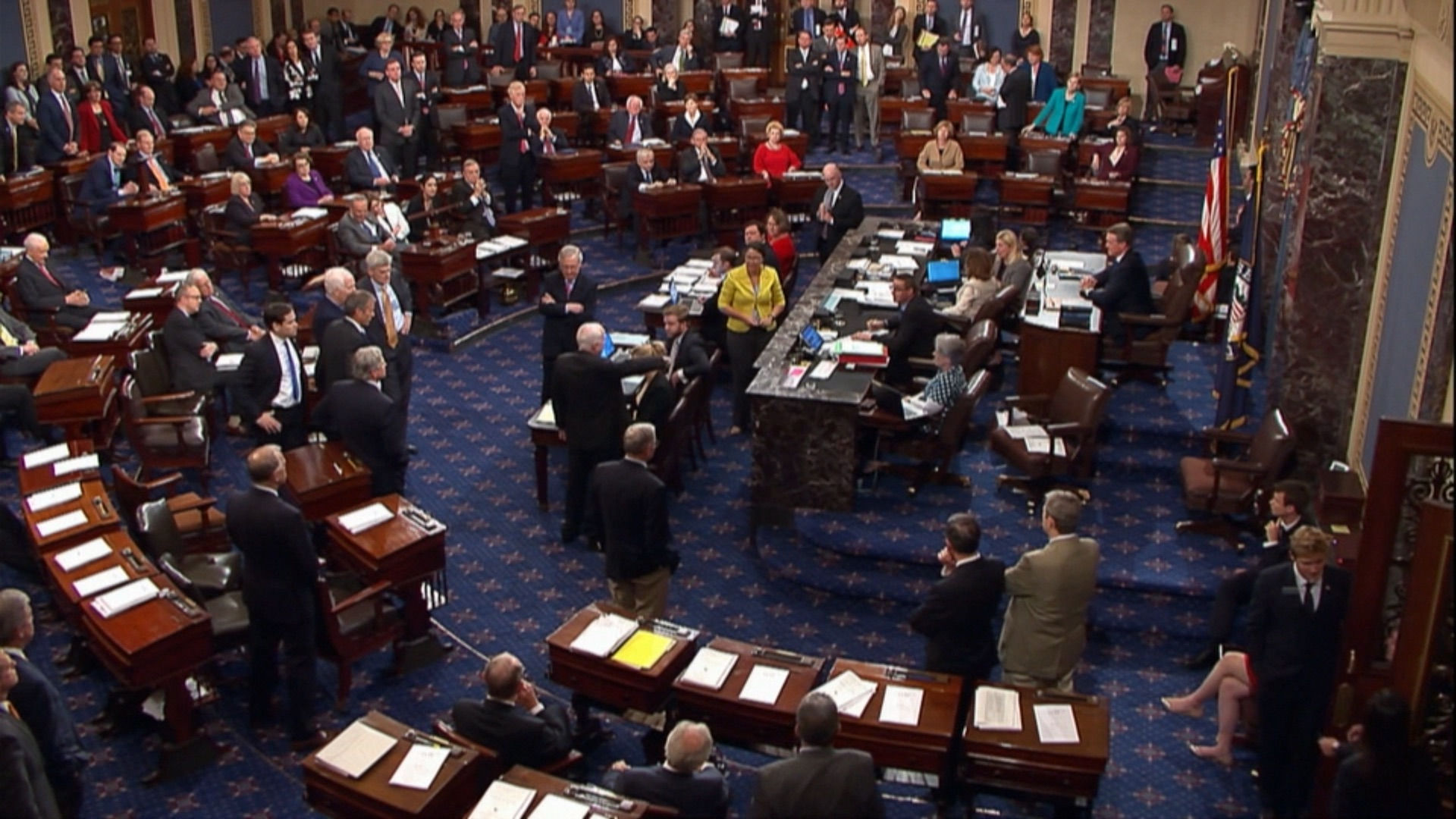
McCain votes no on repealing the Affordable Care Act by giving a thumbs down.

McCain returned to the Senate on July 25, less than two weeks after brain surgery. He cast a deciding vote allowing the Senate to begin consideration of bills to replace the Affordable Care Act. Along with that vote, he delivered a speech criticizing the party-line voting process used by the Republicans, as well as by the Democrats in passing the Affordable Care Act to begin with, and McCain also urged a "return to regular order" using the usual committee hearings and deliberations. On July 28, he cast the decisive vote against the Republicans' final proposal that month, the so-called "skinny repeal" option, which failed 49–51. McCain supported the passage of the Tax Cuts and Jobs Act of 2017.

McCain did not vote in the Senate after December 2017, remaining instead in Arizona to undergo cancer treatment. On April 15, 2018, he underwent surgery for an infection relating to diverticulitis and the following day was reported to be in stable condition.

== Committee assignments ==
- Committee on Armed Services
  - Subcommittee on Airland
  - Subcommittee on Emerging Threats and Capabilities
  - Subcommittee on Seapower (Ranking member)
- Committee on Foreign Relations
  - Subcommittee on East Asian and Pacific Affairs
  - Subcommittee on Western Hemisphere and Global Narcotics Affairs (Ranking member)
  - Subcommittee on Near Eastern and South and Central Asian Affairs
- Committee on Homeland Security and Governmental Affairs
  - Permanent Subcommittee on Investigations (Ranking member)
  - Subcommittee on Financial and Contracting Oversight
- Committee on Indian Affairs

== Caucus memberships ==
- International Conservation Caucus
- Senate Diabetes Caucus
- Senate National Security Caucus (Co-chair)
- Sportsmen's Caucus
- Senate Wilderness and Public Lands Caucus

== Senate elections results ==
U.S. Senate elections in Arizona (Class III): Results 2004–present
Year	Democrat	Votes	Pct	Republican	Votes	Pct	3rd Party	Party	Votes	Pct
2004	Stuart Starky	404,507	21%	John McCain	1,505,372	77%	Ernest Hancock	Libertarian	51,798	3%
2010	Rodney Glassman	540,904	35%	John McCain	926,372	59%	David Nolan	Libertarian	72,993	5%

== See also ==
- List of bills sponsored by John McCain in the United States Senate
