= Political positions of Ted Kennedy =

U.S. Senator Edward M. Kennedy (D-MA) took positions on many political issues throughout his career via his public comments and senatorial voting record. He was broadly liberal with regard to social issues. Kennedy favored stricter gun control, supported LGBT rights and abortion rights, advocated for universal health care, and legislated for education initiatives.

== Abortion ==
Kennedy was initially opposed to abortion rights. In October 1970, he expressed a negative attitude towards abortion: "Don't tell me there's not enough love in the world to take care of all the unwanted children. I don't believe in on-demand abortions. The day when we can solve the problem of the world's population, the problem of browns in Central America, the problem of blacks in the ghetto, by aborting them, is unacceptable to me. What about children in psychiatric hospitals: they are parasitic on the environment. What about the elderly in hospitals: they clutter up the landscape. Do you want to destroy them too?"

In 1971, Kennedy expressed that he opposed legal abortion on demand, writing:

Although the deep concern of a woman carrying an unwanted child deserves attention and sympathy, in my personal opinion, the legalization of abortion on demand does not correspond to the value that our civilization attaches to human life. Desired or not, I believe that human life, even at its earliest stages, has certain rights that must be recognized—the right to be born, the right to love, the right to grow old. Regarding the issue of human freedom of choice, there are readily available methods of birth control and information that women can use to prevent or delay pregnancy. But once life has begun, no matter what stage of growth it is at, I am convinced that the decision to terminate a pregnancy should not be made simply at will. I share the confidence of those who believe that America is working to take care of its unwanted as well as desired children, protecting especially those who cannot protect themselves. I also share the opinion of those who do not accept abortions as a response to the problems of our society — an inadequate social security system, unsatisfactory vocational training programs and insufficient financial support for all its citizens.

— Kennedy, from an excerpt from a letter to a constituent, August 3, 1971

His reversal on this issue after the Roe v. Wade decision in 1973 became a source of continuing dispute between him and the Catholic Church, of which he was a member.

Later, Kennedy declared his personal negative attitude towards abortion and at the same time voted in favor of using federal funds to finance abortions among the poor, according to the Supreme Court decision. This transition period lasted from 1973 to 1979, when he made statements along the following lines (for example, in an interview with Vatican Radio on November 13, 1976): "Personally, I am against abortion, although I did not promote any of the amendments. I feel that there are many different measures, legislative and otherwise, that can be considered. But Americans are divided on this issue." Kennedy continued to have deep doubts and hesitations about his attitude to abortion until 1979, as hinted at by Frank Mankiewicz, the former press secretary of his elder brother Robert Kennedy, who called these problems "strange things" during the 1976 Democratic National Convention.

However, if back in 1978 he considered these issues too acute and inconvenient for public discussion, then in November 1979 he directly supported women's right to abortion (in 1973-1979, with reservations about his negative attitude to this topic, he supported federal funding of Medicaid for poor women). In August 1980, Kennedy succeeded in including an item on support for abortion rights in the Democratic Party's presidential election platform.

In 1987, Kennedy delivered an impassioned speech, condemning Supreme Court nominee Robert Bork as a "right-wing extremist" and warning that "Robert Bork's America" would be one marked by back-alley abortions and other backward practices. Kennedy's strong opposition to Bork's nomination was important to the Senate's rejection of Bork's candidacy. He argued that much of the debate over abortion is a false dichotomy. Speaking at the National Press Club in 2005, he remarked, "Surely, we can all agree that abortion should be rare, and that we should do all we can to help women avoid the need to face that decision. History teaches that abortions do not stop because they are made illegal. Indeed, half of all abortions in the world are performed in places where abortions are illegal. The number of abortions decreases when women and parents have education and economic opportunities" Kennedy voted against the Partial-Birth Abortion Ban Act.

== Affirmative action ==
Kennedy strongly supported affirmative action. In 1996, he called Patrick Chavis a "perfect example" of how affirmative action worked.

== Immigration policy ==
Kennedy introduced, and was a strong supporter of, the 1965 Hart-Celler Act – signed into law by President Lyndon B. Johnson – which dramatically changed U.S. immigration policy. Kennedy said: "The bill will not flood our cities with immigrants. It will not upset the ethnic mix of our society. It will not relax the standards of admission. It will not cause American workers to lose their jobs."

Kennedy asserted that the bill would end the favoring of Europeans for immigration into the United States. The 1965 legislation replaced the Immigration Act of 1924, which favored immigrants from northern and western Europe and Canada. Proponents of the 1965 bill argued that immigration laws and quotas were discriminatory, and that American immigration policy should accept people not on the basis of their nationality. This also abolished the Chinese Exclusion Act of 1882. Kennedy's bill was designed to re-allocate visas to poorer countries, and also added the stipulation that extended families of visa holders would also be eligible for visas. Although Kennedy promised the bill would not increase the number of immigrants into the United States, or change the ethnic composition of the United States, immigration numbers doubled from 1965 to 1970, and then doubled again before 1990.

Kennedy was the chairman of the United States Senate Judiciary Subcommittee on Immigration, Border Security, and Citizenship, and remained a strong advocate for immigrants. Kennedy subsequently took a lead role in several other would-be immigration measures, including the Secure America and Orderly Immigration Act (S. 1033) ("McCain-Kennedy") in 2005 and the Secure Borders, Economic Opportunity, and Immigration Reform Act of 2007, a bi-partisan measure worked out with President George W. Bush which ultimately failed on the floor of the U.S. Senate. Among other reforms, the 1033 legislation proposed allowing "undocumented immigrants in the U.S. to come out of the shadows, submit to background checks, and register for a legal status. Immigrants and their families would have six years to earn permanent residence and, ultimately, citizenship."

== Gun laws ==
Kennedy was a staunch supporter of gun control initiatives. In 2006, he was one of the 16 senators who voted against the Vitter Amendment prohibiting the confiscation of legally possessed firearms during a disaster.

== Energy policy ==
Kennedy generally favored alternative energy sources, and opposed additional Alaska oil drilling. However, he opposed the Cape Wind wind turbine project which would occur near his home.

== Wiretapping ==
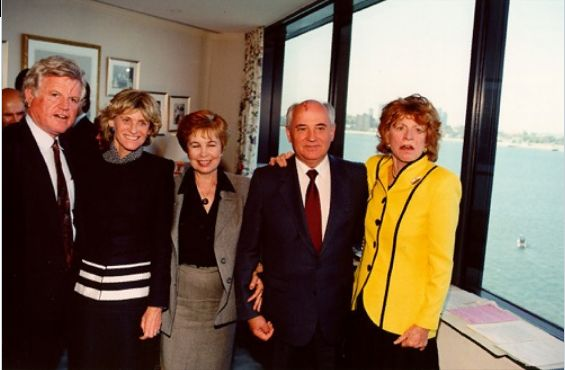
With Mikhail Gorbachev

Kennedy joined other Democratic leaders in the Senate to write letters to Majority Leader Harry Reid in 2007, urging him to take up legislation that would block the Bush administration's warrantless wiretapping program. Among authors of other letters to Reid on this subject were Hillary Clinton, Barack Obama, Joseph Biden, Russ Feingold, and Barbara Boxer.

== Foreign affairs ==
=== Vietnam ===
Following the Cold Warrior path of his brothers, Kennedy was an early proponent of U.S. intervention in Vietnam. Despite publicly becoming a major voice for some in the anti-war movement, it was acknowledged that Kennedy refused to heed calls to investigate the legality of the Gulf of Tonkin Resolution, and that in October 1965, Kennedy publicly denounced the growing number of anti-war demonstrations, while visiting the South Vietnam capital of Saigon to discuss refugee problems. He supported not only the Gulf of Tonkin Resolution, but also the massive U.S. bombing campaign in North Vietnam as well. He also supported increasing the number of U.S. troops in Vietnam from 23,000 to 175,000, and openly promoted the war effort when he told students at Boston University that a U.S. withdrawal from Vietnam "would permanently undermine our credit with other nations in the area, while we are trying to remain independent of the powerful and historic influence exerted in China".

=== Afghanistan ===
Kennedy was opposed to US involvement in Afghanistan following its invasion by the Soviet Union in 1975. He used it as a campaign platform during his campaign for the Democratic presidential nomination in 1980, mocking his incumbent opponent Jimmy Carter, who called the invasion the "biggest threat to world peace since World War II".

Kennedy was a supporter of the war in Afghanistan and the overthrow of the Taliban government in Afghanistan in reaction to the September 11 attacks.

=== Iraq ===
Kennedy opposed the American-led 2003 invasion and subsequent occupation of Iraq. Kennedy was intensely opposed to the Iraq resolution, the bill voted on in 2002 to authorize invasion and occupation, as it would hand over complete military control and maneuverability to the President. Such precedent would not only allow tyrannical military policy, but an undermining of the Democrats. He was also been a harsh critic of the way the invasion of Iraq was planned and conducted by the Bush administration. Kennedy would later say that the best vote he ever cast in the Senate was his vote against giving President Bush the authority to use force against Iraq.

There is clearly a threat from Iraq. And there is clearly a danger. But the administration has not made a convincing case that we face such an imminent threat to our national security that a unilateral pre-emptive American strike and an immediate war are necessary. Nor has the administration laid out the cost in blood and treasure of this operation. ... With all the talk of war, the administration has not explicitly acknowledged, let alone explained to the American people, the immense postwar commitment that will be required to create a stable Iraq.

— Ted Kennedy, Senate Debate on use of force in Iraq, 2002.

As the Iraqi insurgency grew in subsequent years, Kennedy pronounced that the conflict was "Bush's Vietnam." In response to the killing of Massachusetts service personnel by roadside bombs, Kennedy became vocal about Humvee vulnerability, and co-sponsored 2005 legislation that sped up production and Army procurement of up-armored Humvees.

In early 2007, preceding Bush's announcement that he would initiate a troop surge in Iraq, Kennedy made a speech at the National Press Club opposing it. Kennedy was the first Senator in the 110th Congress to propose legislation opposing the troop surge.

=== Israel ===
Ted Kennedy was a staunch supporter of Israel while in the Senate, and was mourned by Israeli leaders such as Shimon Peres and Avigdor Lieberman as a "friend to Israel" when he died. According to one tally, Ted Kennedy voted 100 percent in concert with positions taken by the American Israel Public Affairs Committee. During the run up to the Iraq War, Kennedy said '"Iran has had closer ties to terrorism than Iraq ... Iran has a nuclear weapons development program, and it already has a missile that can reach Israel."

Ted Kennedy's death gained massive public attention in Israel, as all the Kennedy brothers were big supporters of the Jewish state, including Ted Kennedy. In his Senate career, Kennedy promoted US aid to Israel, and fought against proposed arms sales to Jordan and Saudi Arabia. He became the first American politician to meet with Soviet refuseniks in 1974. He rebuked the George H. W. Bush administration when it stopped loan guarantees with Israeli, given the Israeli settlement issue. He also opposed dividing Jerusalem up in a peace deal.

Israeli Prime Minister Benjamin Netanyahu called Kennedy, "a great friend of Israel", and he continued by saying that Kennedy would be missed. Jewish Agency Chairman Natan Sharansky, who was a prisoner of Zion in the Soviet Union, told The Jerusalem Post, "When we were in prison - when I was in prison - Senator Kennedy was one of the most important contacts for our wives and families. He helped bring down the iron curtain and he helped Soviet Jews immigrate to Israel."

"Kennedy was clearly a friend of Israel all the way, and in every place that he could help us, he did", said Israeli President Shimon Peres. His death was "a very big loss to every sensitive and thinking person the world over. May his soul rest in peace."

The Israeli Foreign Ministry issued a condolence on the death of Ted Kennedy. Israeli Minister of Foreign Affairs, Avigdor Lieberman, said Kennedy would be missed, and that he was a great friend of Israel.

Our alliance with Israel is an alliance based on common democratic ideals and mutual benefit. In the critical region of the eastern Mediterranean and the Middle East, Israel is a rock of strength, stability, and friendship, ... We must never barter the freedom and future of Israel for a barrel of oil - or foolishly try to align the Arab world with us, no matter what cost.

— Ted Kennedy's speech in 1980

=== Northern Ireland ===
Kennedy was outspoken in his views about Northern Ireland's constitutional question. In October 1971, he called for the withdrawal of British troops from Northern Ireland, and for all political participants there to begin talks on creating a United Ireland.

In early 2005, Kennedy publicly snubbed Gerry Adams by canceling a previously arranged meeting, citing the Provisional Irish Republican Army's "ongoing criminal activity and contempt for the rule of law." This decision was a direct result of the Northern Bank robbery in December 2004 and the murder of Robert McCartney the following month.

== Education ==
Kennedy became notorious in the 1970s for his support of desegregation busing. He was one of that members of Congress, government, and judges and journalists who supported busing, but sent their own children to private schools.

Speaking at the dedication ceremonies of the Connell School of Nursing, Boston College

Kennedy was a leading member of the bi-partisan team that wrote the controversial No Child Left Behind Act of 2001. According to both Kennedy and President Bush, the Act was a compromise. Kennedy then worked on its passage through a Republican-controlled Congress, despite opposition from members of both parties.

Kennedy opposed federal attempts to cut student financial aid, such as Reagan's 1986 planned limitations on Guaranteed Student Loans to students whose families earned over $32,500 a year, and a planned $4,000 cap on all federal aid and benefits that a student could receive in one year. Following the Republican takeover of Congress in November 1994, there was a renewed effort on the part of key Republican leaders to balance the federal budget by cutting financial aid. The new cuts, which Kennedy also opposed, involved reducing the interest the federal government would pay on student loans, and on Clinton's direct lending program. Kennedy supported the College Affordability and Access Act of 2007, which provides $20 billion in new federal financial aid investments for low- and middle-income students and their families.

Kennedy was an original Senate co-sponsor of the Education for All Handicapped Children Act, the first federal legislation requiring public schools to educate children with disabilities, regardless of disability and/or cost. Research for this bill uncovered that approximately 48 states had restrictions excluding children with disabilities from the public school system.

== Judicial appointments ==
A long-time member of the Senate Judiciary Committee (and its chairman from 1979 to 1981), Kennedy was an important Democratic voice during debates and confirmation votes on United States Supreme Court nominees. He and Daniel Inouye, also elected in 1962, voted on more appointments than every other Senator, except Robert Byrd.

Kennedy supported the nominations of Abe Fortas and Thurgood Marshall (both by President Lyndon B. Johnson). Of Richard Nixon's nominees, he backed the successful nominations of Warren Burger (for Chief Justice), Harry Blackmun, and Lewis F. Powell. Like most Democrats, he opposed G. Harrold Carswell and Clement Haynsworth (both rejected). He also voted against the confirmation of William H. Rehnquist as Associate Justice, although he was easily confirmed. Kennedy supported Gerald Ford's nomination of John Paul Stevens, who was confirmed unanimously. Of Ronald Reagan's nominees, Kennedy supported Sandra Day O'Connor, Antonin Scalia, and Anthony Kennedy (confirmed), but was one of the leaders of opposition against the nomination of Robert Bork. Within 45 minutes of Bork's nomination to the Court, he took to the Senate floor with a strong condemnation of Bork in a nationally televised speech, declaring: "Robert Bork's America is a land in which women would be forced into back-alley abortions, blacks would sit at segregated lunch counters, rogue police could break down citizens' doors in midnight raids, and schoolchildren could not be taught about evolution, writers and artists could be censored at the whim of government." Bork's nomination was rejected, and Kennedy was credited with leading Democratic opposition. Democratic Senator Joseph Biden, though, said that Kennedy's speech was "technically accurate, but unfair", and said that it "drew lines in ways that were starker than reality". Kennedy also opposed William Rehnquist's successful nomination to become Chief Justice. He opposed both of George H. W. Bush's successful nominations, David Souter and Clarence Thomas, as well, but supported Bill Clinton's nominations of Ruth Bader Ginsburg and Stephen Breyer.

He strongly opposed the successful nominations of both Chief Justice John G. Roberts and Justice Samuel Alito, both nominated by President George W. Bush.

From 2001 to 2003, Kennedy led a forty-five member all-Democrat Senate filibuster to block the appointment of former assistant Solicitor General Miguel Estrada to the United States court of appeals. When Estrada withdrew his nomination, Kennedy proclaimed that it was "a victory for the Constitution".

== LGBT Rights ==
Kennedy was considered to be one of the biggest advocates of LGBT rights in the U.S. Senate, and he received ratings of 100 percent by the Human Rights Campaign for the 107th, 108th, and 109th sessions of U.S. Congress, indicating that he voted in support of issues the HRC considers important with regards to equality for LGBT persons. He was one of the Senate's very few supporters of same-sex marriage, and was one of the fourteen senators to vote against the Defense of Marriage Act in 1996. He also voted against the proposed Federal Marriage Amendment in 2004 and 2006.

However, until the 1970s, Kennedy remained a pillar of social conservatism, but over time he became increasingly influenced by new trends and began to think about the right of sexual and gender minorities to lead their own way of life. The older he got, the more he came across such people, starting to draw parallels with discrimination against Irish Catholics and African Americans. Kennedy went through a slow and gradual process of reassessing values, changing his views as time passed. The evolution of the worldview has led to huge changes towards the proclamation of tolerance. On November 17, 1971, 15 members of the Gay Activists Alliance in New York took Kennedy by surprise with their "zap" action while talking to the press, asking for his help in achieving civil rights and creating jobs for homosexuals. He agreed with the questioner of the leader of this group that homosexuals do not pose a threat to security in the federal defense service or in other positions. This statement by the senator was his first step towards further support for the growing LGBTQ movements. Nevertheless, Kennedy continued to have deep doubts and hesitations about his attitude to LGBTQ rights until 1979, as hinted at by Frank Mankiewicz, the former press secretary of his elder brother Robert Kennedy, who called these problems "strange things" (he also tried to establish contacts with their movement in 1972) during the 1976 Democratic National Convention.

But if back in 1978, Kennedy considered these issues too acute and inconvenient for public discussion, then in November 1979, for the first time, he openly expressed support for LGBTQ representatives who were already gaining political influence under the pretext of greater tolerance/inadmissibility of discrimination based on sexual preferences (he promised to issue a decree prohibiting discrimination). By the end of May 1980, he and his wife Joan traveled to San Francisco, where they openly campaigned in the gay bars of the Castro district. Kennedy even attended a charity event at the Hollywood Hills house in Los Angeles and ensured that the fundraiser for his campaign took place in the presence of television cameras from the media. Before that, no candidate from a major party had ever appeared at fundraising events organized by gay supporters. They discussed issues of taxes, healthcare, and immigration restrictions. Kennedy left the meeting with a greater awareness of the complex issues that the lawmakers had not yet encountered. In August 1980, he succeeded in including a clause prohibiting discrimination based on sexual orientation in the election platform of the Democratic Party. Since then, Kennedy was always a supporter of LGBT rights.

== Wage and price controls ==
Kennedy was a long-time advocate of raising the minimum wage. He helped pass the Fair Minimum Wage Act of 2007, which incrementally raised the minimum wage from $5.15 to $7.25 over a two-year period. The bill also included some controversial tax cuts for small businesses and higher taxes for many $1 million-plus executives. Kennedy was quoted as saying, "Passing this wage hike represents a small, but necessary, step to help lift America's working poor out of the ditches of poverty, and onto the road toward economic prosperity".

In the 1970s, Kennedy joined with fellow senators Ernest Hollings and Henry M. Jackson in a press conference, to oppose President Gerald Ford's request that Congress end Richard Nixon's price controls on domestic oil, which had helped to cause the gasoline lines during the 1973 Oil Crisis. Kennedy said he believed ending the price controls (which have been blamed for increasing America's dependence on foreign oil, and were ended in 1981) would produce "no additional oil".

== Environmental record ==
Kennedy had a strong pro-environment voting record. He voted in favor of disallowing an oil leasing program in Alaska's ANWR, removing oil and gas exploration subsidies, including oil and gas smokestacks in mercury regulations, and reducing funds for road-building in forests. He voted against reducing funding to renewable and solar energy projects, requiring ethanol in gasoline, Bush administration energy policy, and approving a nuclear waste repository. Kennedy was a critic of the Bush administration's environmental record, and has stated: "We must not let the administration distort science and rewrite and manipulate scientific reports in other areas. We must not let it turn the Environmental Protection Agency into the Environmental Pollution Agency."

== Health care ==
Kennedy believed that health care coverage was a fundamental right for all individuals, and fought for universal health care in the United States until his death. In 2010, Congress passed, and President Barack Obama signed, the Affordable Health Care for America Act, to provide near universal health care coverage in the United States by 2014. Kennedy's widow, Vicki, attended the signing ceremony for the bill.

== 18-year-old right to vote ==
Senator Kennedy was a long proponent of the 18-year-old's right to vote. He demonstrated his support in his testimony in front of the Subcommittee for Lowering the Voting Age to 18. During his testimony, he stated: "Long ago, according to historians, the age of maturity was fixed at 21, because that was the age at which a young man was thought to be capable of bearing armor. Strange as it may seem, the weight of armor in the 11th century governs the right to vote of Americans in the 20th century." Senator Kennedy continued to support this initiative until it was realized with the signing of the Twenty-sixth Amendment on July 5, 1971.
