= List of bills sponsored by John McCain in the United States Senate =

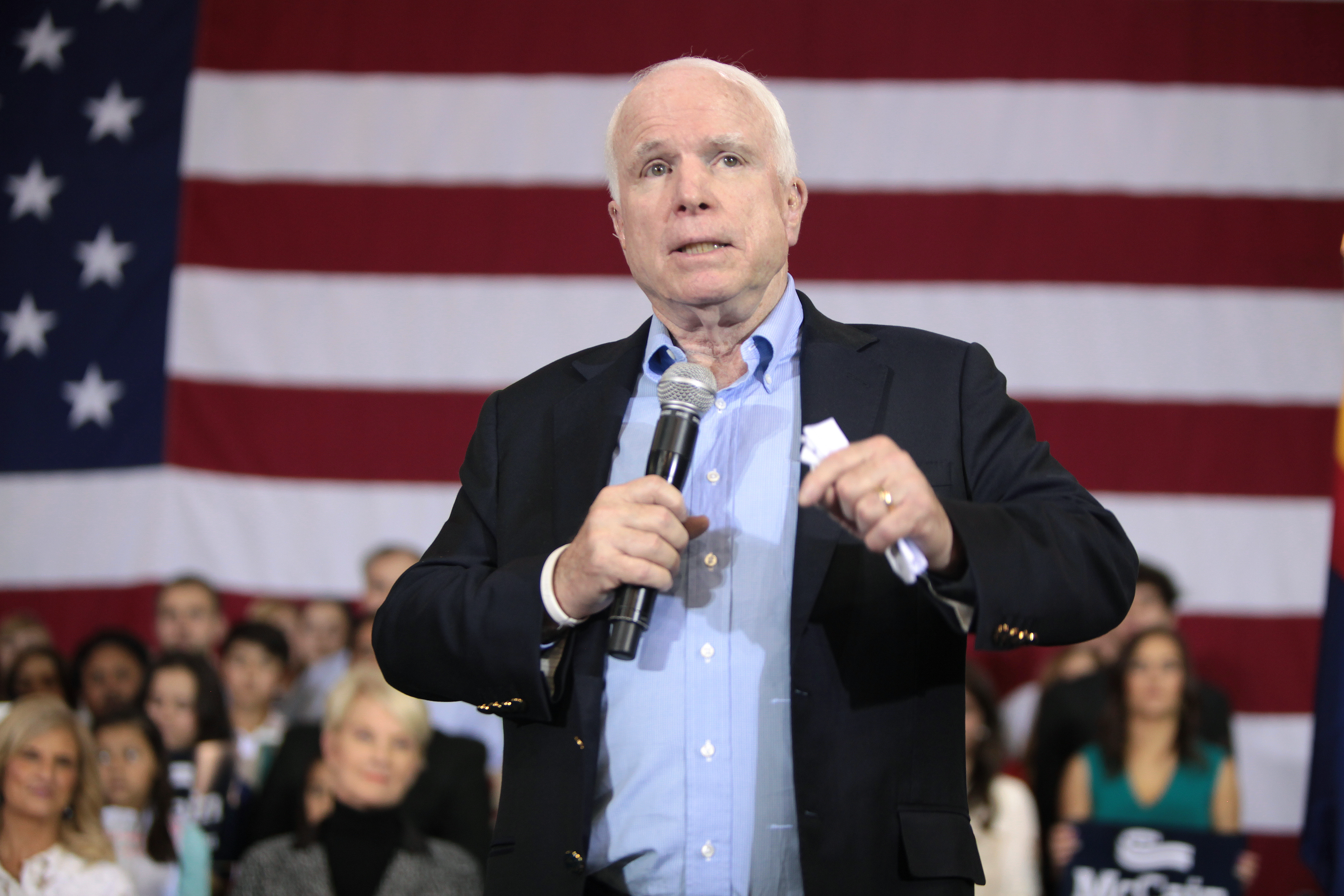
John McCain in 2015

This is a list of bills sponsored by John McCain in the United States Senate.

== Number by Congress ==
- 100th United States Congress: 39 bills sponsored
- 101st United States Congress: 63 bills sponsored
- 102nd United States Congress: 211 bills sponsored
- 103rd United States Congress: 144 bills sponsored
- 104th United States Congress: 217 bills sponsored – 8 became law
- 105th United States Congress: 224 bills sponsored – 3 became law.
- 106th United States Congress: 167 bills sponsored
- 107th United States Congress: 232 bills sponsored
- 108th United States Congress: 189 bills sponsored – 2 became law.
- 109th United States Congress: 143 bills sponsored – 4 became law.
- 110th United States Congress: 38 bills sponsored

== Specific bills and acts ==
- Climate Stewardship Acts: Co-sponsor Joe Lieberman. (failed)
- Bipartisan Campaign Reform Act: Co-sponsor Russ Feingold.
- Detainee Treatment Act

== See also ==
- House and Senate career of John McCain, until 2000
- Senate career of John McCain, 2001–present
