= Striving =

Striving may refer to:

- Perfectionistic strivings (in psychology)
- STRIVE Act of 2007, proposed United States legislation
- Jihad — for Striving in Islam
- Conatus — for the Latin word
