= Security Through Regularized Immigration and a Vibrant Economy Act of 2007 =

Proposed US immigration reform bill

The Security Through Regularized Immigration and a Vibrant Economy Act of 2007 or STRIVE Act of 2007 was proposed United States legislation designed to address the problem of illegal immigration, introduced into the United States House of Representatives (H.R. 1645). Its supporters claimed it would've toughen border security, increase enforcement of and criminal penalties for illegal immigration, and establish an employment verification system to identify undocumented immigrants working in the United States. It would've also established new programs for both undocumented immigrants and new immigrant workers to achieve legal citizenship. Critics alleged that the bill would've turn law enforcement agencies into social welfare agencies as it would not allow CBP to detain undocumented immigrants that were eligible for Z-visas and would grant amnesty to millions of undocumented immigrants with very few restrictions. The bill never received a vote in the House.

The bill was introduced by Rep. Luis Guiterrez (D-IL) with a bipartisan set of co-sponsors.

At the same time, the Secure Borders, Economic Opportunity and Immigration Reform Act of 2007 was being considered in the United States Senate, to much more public attention.

- The INS is no longer in existence. With the passage of public law 107–296 in 2002 the INS was brought under Department of Homeland Security and divided into three factions assuming previously INS responsibilities: USCIS, US Customs and Border Protection, and Immigration and Citizenship Enforcement (ICE). This law would affect these three agencies.

== Description ==
The STRIVE Act mirrored previous attempts to reach bipartisan support for immigration legislation by combining harsher enforcement policies with new programs for aliens to attain citizenship. For example, the unsuccessful 2005 Secure America Act (also known as the McCain–Kennedy Bill) struck a similar compromise.

=== Title I – Border Enforcement ===
Title I of the STRIVE Act:

- Increases border security personnel
- Mandates the Department of Defense share surveillance equipment with the Department of Homeland Security (DHS) to better track immigrants entering the United States illegally
- Requires the DHS acquire and utilize unmanned aerial vehicles for border surveillance purposes
- Creates new criminal penalties for the evasion of border inspection personnel
- Requires the DHS submit a comprehensive national border security strategy to Congress within 6 months of the enactment of the act.
- Mandates the US government to cooperate with Mexico to address border security, human trafficking, drug trafficking, and gang activity.
- Reduces fraud by enhancing travel documents to include biometric data
- Awards grants to local law enforcement agencies that assist border-related prosecution

=== Title II – Interior Enforcement ===
==== Tougher criminal penalties ====
Title II of the STRIVE Act increases criminal penalties for crimes associated with:

- gang-related activities
- failure to depart after removal
- willful failure to comply with terms of release under supervision
- illegal reentry
- drunk driving
- people smuggling
- employing illegal aliens
- selling firearms to an illegal alien (would make this a federal crime)
- possessing firearms as an illegal alien (would make this a federal crime)
- travel document fraud
- money laundering

==== Other provisions ====
Title II would also:

- authorize the DHS to construct facilities to detain a combined total of 20,000 or more aliens while they await decisions on removal
- increase Immigration and Customs Enforcement agents
- grants broader authority to subject aliens to expedited removal
- establishes criminal assistance program that reimburses state and local governments for pre-conviction costs for aliens charged with or convicted of crimes
- requires a determination of immigration status for all individuals charged with a federal crime

=== Title III Employment Verification ===
Title III of the STRIVE Act mandates that the Social Security Administration create a verification system for employers to authenticate employees' authorization to work. The system would be implemented in phases and must include safeguards to protect privacy and prevent employers from racial profiling. Title III also creates significant new civil and criminal penalties for hiring unauthorized employees.

=== Title IV – New Worker Program ===
Title IV of the STRIVE Act creates two programs for foreign workers to achieve temporary and permanent citizenship.

==== H-2C Worker Visa Program ====
The Worker Visa Program would establish a new H-2C visa for future immigrant workers and their families. The temporary visa would be valid for three years and renewable one-time for an additional three years. Employers may hire these new immigrant workers only if they are unable to find a qualified American worker and only if they are located in an area with an unemployment rate lower than 10 percent for workers whose education level is at or below a high school diploma.

The visa program has an initial cap of 400,000, which adjusts up or down yearly based on market fluctuations.

Applicants for a H-2C visa must meet the following requirements:

- demonstrate job qualifications
- provide evidence of a job offer from U.S. employer
- complete criminal- and terrorism-related background checks
- pay a $500 application fee
- undergo a medical exam
- show admissibility to the U.S.

It includes labor rights and protections for new workers including:

- competitive wages
- the same conditions and benefits as received by U.S. workers
- the ability to travel outside the United States
- whistleblower protections
- right to change employers (portability) so long as the new employer has complied with the applicable H-2C recruiting requirements
- an opportunity to apply for permanent resident status through the Earned Citizenship Program (see below)

The H-2C visa would take effect one year after the enactment of the Strive Act. Congress would be required to enact implementation regulations within six months.

==== Earned Citizenship ====
The Earned Citizenship Program provides new immigrant workers (and their spouses and children) with an opportunity to apply for conditional permanent residence and eventual citizenship.

Requirements for Earned Citizenship

- work in United States for five years
- show physical presence in the U.S. and evidence of employment
- complete criminal and security background checks
- pay $500 application fee
- meet English and civic requirements
- show admissibility

=== Title V – Visa Reforms ===
Title V of the STRIVE Act makes certain reforms to the US visa system in order to increase the rate of immigration and reduce inefficiency.

These reforms include adjustments to annual numerical visa limits such as:

- exempting immediate relatives from the 480,000 annual family-sponsored visa limit
- increasing the limit of annual employer sponsored visas from 140,000 to 290,000
- slightly increasing the per-country cap on family and employer sponsored visas
- exempting certain highly skilled workers from caps on H-1B visas and employer-sponsored visas
- exempting sons and daughters of Filipino World War II veterans from annual visa limitations

Title V also provides for special immigration benefits for victims of a major disaster or emergency. It also provides a special immigration status for women and children deemed to have a credible fear of harm in their home country.

=== Title VI – Legalization of Illegal Aliens ===
Title VI of the STRIVE Act provides two new programs for certain qualified illegal aliens to acquire citizenship. These programs mirror the ones in Title IV of the STRIVE Act, but are for illegal aliens rather than new or prospective immigrant workers.

==== Conditional Nonimmigrant Program ====
The Conditional Nonimmigrant Program creates a new six-year visa for illegal aliens and their families.

Requirements for Conditional Nonimmigrant Status:

- Establish continuous presence in the U.S. on or before June 1, 2006
- Verify employment in the U.S. before June 1, 2006, and employment since that date
- Complete criminal and security background checks
- Pay a $500 fine plus necessary application fees
- Must not be ineligible to receive a visa pursuant to the Immigration and Nationality Act
- Has not been convicted of a felony or three or more misdemeanors
- Has not participated in the persecution of another person on account of race, religion, nationality, membership in a particular social group or political opinion
- Has not been convicted by final judgment of a particularly serious crime and there are no reasonable grounds for believing that the alien has committed a particularly serious crime abroad before arriving in the U.S.

There is a penalty of up to five years' imprisonment for anyone who willfully falsifies information in an application for conditional nonimmigrant status.

==== Earned Citizenship ====
The Earned Citizenship Program for Undocumented Individuals provides qualified conditional nonimmigrants and their families with an opportunity to apply for lawful permanent resident status (green card) and eventual citizenship.

Applicants must:

- meet employment requirements during the six-year period immediately preceding the application for adjustment
- Pay a $1,500 fine plus application fees
- Complete criminal and security background checks
- Establish registration under the selective service (if applicable)
- Meet English and civic requirements
- Undergo a medical examination
- Pay all taxes
- Show admissibility to the U.S.
- Meet a Legal Reentry requirement during the six-year period in conditional nonimmigrant status, no later than 90 days before filing an application for adjustment to lawful permanent resident status.

Some additional features of the Earned Citizenship Program for Undocumented Individuals are:

- applicants go to the back of the line for permanent visas
- current immigrant backlogs must be cleared before qualified conditional nonimmigrant visa applicants (and their families) can adjust to permanent resident status
- new penalties for making false statements in an application for earned citizenship are created
- immigrants who adjust from a conditional nonimmigrant visa (including dependents) to lawful permanent resident status shall not be counted against the numerical visa caps
- those appealing decisions associated with the application for adjustment to permanent status have access to a defined administrative and judicial process

==== Other provisions ====
Title VI includes the following acts:

- DREAM Act of 2007
- AgJOBS Act of 2007
- Strengthening American Citizenship Act of 2007

Title VI also creates grant programs to assist new workers and to address poverty in Mexico.

=== Title VII – Miscellaneous ===
The bill also would increase resources for the immigration court system, provide relief for immigrant victims of the 9–11 attacks and their families, and facilitate naturalization for members of the armed forces.
