= Comprehensive Immigration Reform Act of 2007 =

Proposed American bill

The Comprehensive Immigration Reform Act of 2007

Legislative history
- Bill citation: S. 1348
- Introduced by: Sen. Harry Reid (D-NV)
- Introduced: May 9, 2007

The Comprehensive Immigration Reform Act of 2007 (full name: Secure Borders, Economic Opportunity and Immigration Reform Act of 2007 (S. 1348)) was a bill discussed in the 110th United States Congress that would have provided legal status and a path to citizenship for the approximately 12 million undocumented or improperly documented immigrants residing in the United States. The bill was portrayed as a compromise between providing a path to citizenship for illegal immigrants and increased border enforcement: it included funding for 300 miles (480 km) of vehicle barriers, 105 camera and radar towers, and 20,000 more Border Patrol agents, while simultaneously restructuring visa criteria around high-skilled workers. The bill also received heated criticism from both sides of the immigration debate.

The bill was introduced in the United States Senate on May 9, 2007, but was never voted on, though a series of votes on amendments and cloture took place. The last vote on cloture, on June 7, 2007, 11:59 AM, failed 34–61 effectively ending the bill's chances.

A related bill S. 1639, on June 28, 2007, 11:04 AM, also failed 46–53.

== Legislative history ==
The bill was a compromise based largely on three previous failed immigration reform bills:

- The Secure America and Orderly Immigration Act (S. 1033), a bill proposed in May 2005 by Senators Ted Kennedy and John McCain, sometimes referred to as the "McCain–Kennedy or McKennedy Bill."
- The Comprehensive Enforcement and Immigration Reform Act of 2005 (S. 1438), a bill proposed in July 2005 by Senators John Cornyn and Jon Kyl, sometimes referred to as the "Cornyn–Kyl Bill."
- The Comprehensive Immigration Reform Act of 2006 (S. 2611), sponsored by Senator Arlen Specter, which was passed in the Senate in May 2006 but never passed in the House.

The bill's sole sponsor in the Senate was Majority Leader Harry Reid, though it was crafted in large part as a result of efforts by Senators Kennedy, McCain and Kyl, along with Senator Lindsey Graham, and input from President George W. Bush, who strongly supported the bill. For that reason it was referred to in the press by various combinations of these five men's names, most commonly "Kennedy–Kyl". A larger group of senators was involved in creating the bill, sometimes referred to as the 'Gang of 12'. Senator David Vitter of Louisiana led the opposition to the bill, clashing with McCain and Senator Chuck Hagel of Nebraska.

At the same time, the Security Through Regularized Immigration and a Vibrant Economy Act of 2007 was being considered in the United States House of Representatives, although to considerably less public attention.

On June 7, three Senate votes on cloture (a move to end discussion) for the bill failed with the first losing 33–63, the second losing 34–61 and the third losing 45–50. This had been thought by some observers to signal the end of the bill's chances, since on that day, after the first failing vote, Harry Reid had told reporters that, if another vote on cloture failed, "the bill's over with. The bill's gone."

However, at the urging of President Bush, the bill was brought back for discussion in the Senate as bill S. 1639 on June 25. On June 26, a motion to proceed passed the Senate, by a margin of 64–35 (under Senate rules it needed 60 votes). A number of amendments to the bill were considered and rejected. On June 28, the bill failed to get the 60 votes necessary to end debate. The final cloture vote lost, 46–53 with Republicans mostly voting against the bill (37-12) and Democrats mostly voting for it (34-16). This effectively ended its chances, and President Bush said he was disappointed at Congress's failure to act on the issue.

== Changes to immigration policy ==
S.1639 would have created a new class of visa, the "Z visa", that would be given to everyone who was living without a valid visa in the United States on Jan. 1, 2010; this visa would give its holder the legal right to remain in the United States for the rest of their lives, and access to a Social Security number. After eight years, the holder of a Z visa would be eligible for a United States Permanent Resident Card (a "green card") if they wanted to have one; they would first have to pay a $2,000 fine, and back taxes for some of the period in which they worked. By the normal rules of green cards, five years after that the undocumented immigrant could begin the process of becoming a U.S. citizen.

S.1639 would have required such an undocumented immigrant to be in his or her home country when he or she applies for a green card.

S.1639 would have also ended family reunification, in which an immigrant who becomes a U.S. citizen can ease the process by which their relatives from outside the country can get green cards. Under the bill, only the spouse and children of a new citizen would be made eligible for green cards.

S.1639 would eliminate the employer-sponsored component of the immigration system and replace it with a point-based "merit" system. Points would be awarded by the USCIS adjudicating officers for a combination of education, job skills, family connections and English proficiency. Sponsorship of a U.S. employer would not be required although additional points would be awarded if a U.S. job offer was available. The Permanent Labor Certification process would also be eliminated. Several family-based immigration categories would also be folded into the point system. Points-based systems are already used for admitting skilled immigrants in the United Kingdom, Australia, Canada and other developed countries.

=== Guest worker program ===
Another new category of visa, the "Y visa", would have been created, that would let temporary guest workers stay in the country for two years, after which they would have to return home. The original bill set this program at 400,000 people a year. However, its scope was greatly reduced by two amendments passed by the Senate: the first, sponsored by Senator Jeff Bingaman, reduced the number of entrants to 200,000 a year; the second, sponsored by Senator Byron Dorgan, set the program to only run for five years.

=== Increased enforcement ===
The bill would have increased enforcement of the United States-Mexico border, including increasing the number of border patrol agents by 20,000 and adding another 370 miles (600 km) of fencing, among others.

The bill would have also created a new program, the "Employment Eligibility Verification System", that would be a central database meant to hold immigrant-status information on all workers living in the United States. Eventually all employers, regardless of size of the company, would have been required to assemble this information and keep the system updated on all their employees.

Under the terms of the bill, no further part of the bill would have gone forward until these measures had been implemented.

A group of conservative Republican senators, led by Jim DeMint, claimed that a majority of the enforcement provisions in the bill were already required under previous law, including the 2005 REAL ID Act and the 2006 Secure Fence Act.

=== DREAM Act provisions ===
The bill contained within it the entirety of the DREAM Act, a bill that has been introduced unsuccessfully several times in the House and Senate, that would provide a path to citizenship for undocumented immigrants brought into the country as minors who either go to college or serve in the U.S. military; it would also restore states rights in determining eligibility for in-state tuition.

The DREAM Act has four basic requirements, which are:

- Must have entered the country before the age of 16;
- Must graduate high school or obtain a GED;
- Must have good moral character (no criminal record); and
- Must have at least five years of continuous presence in the US.

== Criticism ==
The bills received heated criticism from both the right wing and the left wing. Conservatives rejected providing a path to citizenship for illegal immigrants, as it would reward them for disregarding United States immigration laws. Liberals criticized the points-based system and provisions limiting family reunification visas available to only nuclear family members of US citizens as unfair. Labor unions, human rights, and some Hispanic organizations attacked the guest workers program, claiming that it would create a group of underclass workers with no benefits. Another criticism of the guest workers program was that because each guest worker is required to return home for a year before renewing his or her visa, these workers would instead overstay their visa, becoming illegal immigrants.

High-tech industry criticized the point-based green card system for scrapping employer sponsorship of green card applications and eliminating priority processing for the highly skilled workers specifically selected by the U.S. employers. Many immigration practitioners, while supporting aspects of the proposal, criticized the bill as "unworkable" and called for fundamentally revising it. Critics of the bill in the U.S. Senate also complained that the Senate consideration of the bill did not follow the usual procedure, as the bill did not go through the committee debate and approval process and the opportunities to offer floor amendments were limited.

== Film ==
"Last Best Chance", story 12 in How Democracy Works Now: Twelve Stories, a documentary series from filmmaking team Shari Robertson and Michael Camerini, centers around Ted Kennedy's efforts to pass the Comprehensive Immigration Reform Act of 2007. The film premiered on HBO as "The Senators' Bargain" on March 24, 2010, and was featured in the 2010 Human Rights Watch Film Festival at Lincoln Center. Since its release the film has become an important resource for advocates, policy-makers and educators.

== See also ==
- Immigration
- Immigration to the United States
- How Democracy Works Now: Twelve Stories
