= Climate Stewardship Acts =

Proposed United States federal legislation

The Climate Stewardship Acts are a series of three acts introduced to the United States Senate by Senator John McCain (R-AZ) and Senator Joseph Lieberman (ID-CT), with a number of other co-sponsors. They aimed to introduce a mandatory cap and trade system for greenhouse gases, as a response to the threat of anthropogenic climate change. All three acts failed to gain enough votes to pass through the senate.

== Legislative history ==
Congress	Short title	Bill number(s)	Date introduced	Sponsor(s)	# of cosponsors	Latest status
108th Congress	Climate Stewardship Act of 2004	H.R. 4067	March 30, 2004	Wayne Gilchrest (R-MD)	85	Died in committee
108th Congress	Climate Stewardship Act of 2003	S. 139	January 9, 2003	Joe Lieberman (D-CT)	9	Died in committee
109th Congress	Climate Stewardship Act of 2005	H.R. 759	February 10, 2005	Wayne Gilchrest (R-MD)	122	Died in committee
109th Congress	Climate Stewardship Act of 2005	S. 342	February 10, 2005	John McCain (R-AZ)	16	Died in committee
109th Congress	Climate Stewardship and Innovation Act of 2005	S. 1151	May 26, 2005	John McCain (R-AZ)	3	Died in committee
110th Congress	Climate Stewardship Act of 2007	H.R. 620	January 22, 2007	John Olver (D-MA)	136	Died in committee
110th Congress	Climate Stewardship and Economic Security Act of 2007	H.R. 4226	November 15, 2007	Wayne Gilchrest (R-MD)	5	Died in committee
110th Congress	Climate Stewardship and Innovation Act of 2007	S. 280	January 12, 2007	Joe Lieberman (I-CT)	11	Died in committee

== 2003 Climate Stewardship Act ==
The first Act (S. 139, H.R. 4067) was defeated in the U.S. Senate by 55 votes to 43.

If passed, it would have capped 2010 CO_{2} emissions at the 2000 level. Residential and agricultural areas, as well as other areas deemed "not feasible", would be exempt. As such, approximately 85% of the United States' emissions would have been covered for the year 2000. The bill would have also established a scholarship at the National Academy of Sciences for those studying climatology.

=== Economic forecasts used to oppose climate legislation ===
The economic consultancy Charles River Associates produced forecasts showing a negative impact on employment of the Act. Their work was criticized in 2005 for using unrealistic economic assumptions and producing directionally incorrect estimates. A 2021 study concluded their work from the 1990s to the 2010s overestimated predicted costs and ignored potential policy benefits, and was often presented by politicians and lobbyists as independent rather than sponsored by the fossil fuel industry. Other papers published in the late 1990s by economists at Wharton Econometric Forecasting Associates (and later, in the 2010s, at MIT), also with funding from the fossil fuel industry, produced similar conclusions.

== 2005 Climate Stewardship and Innovation Act ==
Under a slightly modified title, but with similar provisions, the Act (S. 1151) was reintroduced to a new Congress. The Act now called for the federal government to play a lead role in researching and commercialising new energy technologies, and particularly nuclear plant designs. This bill also would provide for the trading of emission allowances and reductions as Climate Change Credits.

The bill was defeated 38 Yea to 60 Nay.

=== Climate Change Credit Corporation ===
Allocation of special Emission Permits by the Climate Change Corporation (to be created as part of the Climate Stewardship and Innovation Act) was intended to provide funding for assistance for consumers and industry to fully comply with the act. Permits would be allocated to support the activities of a Climate Change Credit Corporation, a combination public and private agency that would oversee the cap and trade program, provide credit (Climate Change Credits) to participating entities for reductions in the total greenhouse gases made before 2012, and facilitate transition for industries with competitiveness concerns and fewer options for efficient energy reduction technology. These credits are limited but can be used, bought, or sold.

== 2007 Climate Stewardship and Innovation Act ==
The substantial strengthening of this Act (S. 280) involved the provision for the emissions cap, immobile in previous Acts, to be gradually reduced, following the theory of contraction and convergence. It was co-sponsored by eleven senators and also received endorsements from the National Wildlife Federation, Environmental Defense, and the Pew Center on Global Climate Change, now the Center for Climate and Energy Solutions.

Reductions in emissions under the Act would be to 2004 levels by 2012, 1990 levels by 2020, and 60% below 1990 by 2050. The 60% target is the level posited for the forthcoming UK Climate Change Bill.

The Act died after being referred to committee, without a vote of the full Senate.

== See also ==
- Climate change denial
- Stewardship
- Tradable allowance
