= Secure America and Orderly Immigration Act =

2005 failed American bill

Legislative history
- Bill citation: S. 1033
- Introduced by: Sen. John McCain (R-AZ); Sen. Ted Kennedy (D-MA)
- Introduced: May 12, 2005

Secure America and Orderly Immigration Act ("McCain–Kennedy Bill", S. 1033) was an immigration reform bill introduced in the United States Senate on May 12, 2005 by Senators John McCain and Ted Kennedy. It was the first of its kind since the early 2000s in incorporating legalization, guest worker programs, and border enforcement components.

== Legislation history ==
As United States immigration debate unfolded in Congress and in the field during 2005 and 2006, the bill became a landmark legislation that was often referenced by most parties of the debate to indicate support or opposition to a certain kind of immigration reform that incorporated the three components. The bill was never voted on in the Senate. The Comprehensive Immigration Reform Act of 2006 and the Comprehensive Immigration Reform Act of 2007 are two additional compromises based on the original McCain–Kennedy bill.

== See also ==
- Immigration
- Immigration to the United States
