= James Thompson =

James, Jim, Jimmy or Jamie Thompson may refer to:

== Arts and sciences ==
- James Thompson (cartographer) (active 1785), who produced one of the first maps of York
- James Thompson (crime writer) (1964–2014), American-Finnish crime writer
- James Thompson (designer) (born 1966), Northern Irish inventor and patent holder in the airline seating industry
- James Thompson (journalist) (1817–1877), journalist and local historian
- James Thompson (surveyor) (1789–1872), who produced the first plat of Chicago
- James D. Thompson (James David Thompson, 1920–1973), American sociologist, author of Organizations in Action
- James Edwin Thompson (1863-1927), English born American surgeon
- James Matthew Thompson (1878–1956), English historian and theologian
- James Maurice Thompson (1844–1901), American novelist
- James R. Thompson Jr. (James Robert Thompson, 1936–2017), known as J. R. Thompson, former director of NASA's Marshall Space Flight Center, 1986–1989
- James R. Thompson (statistician) (James Robert Thompson, 1938–2017), American statistician
- James Westfall Thompson (1869–1941), American historian
- Jamie Thompson (musician), Canadian musician
- Jim Thompson (designer) (James Harrison Wilson Thompson, 1906 – disappeared 1967), American businessman and Olympic sailor
- Jim Thompson (writer) (James Myers Thompson, 1906–1977), American author and screenwriter, known for his pulp crime fiction
- Jimmy Thompson (actor) (James Edward Thompson, 1925–2005), British actor
- Jimmy Thompson (comics artist) (George Orlando Thompson, 1907–1949), Canadian artist in the Golden Age of Comics
- Uncle Jimmy Thompson (Jesse Donald Thompson, 1848–1931), country music pioneer

== Business ==
- James Pyke Thompson (1846–1897), English corn merchant and philanthropist
- James Walter Thompson (1847–1928), American advertiser and namesake of the JWT advertising agency
- Jim Thompson (designer) (James Harrison Wilson Thompson, 1906 – disappeared 1967), revived the Thai silk industry
- James E. Thompson (born 1940), founder, chairman and chief executive of The Crown Worldwide Group

== Military ==
- James Thompson (VC) (William James Thompson, 1830–1891), recipient of the Victoria Cross
- James Thompson of brothers Allen and James Thompson (1849–1921), American Civil War soldier and Medal of Honor recipient
- Floyd James Thompson (Floyd James "Jim" Thompson, 1933–2002), America's longest-held prisoner of war in Vietnam
- James B. Thompson (1843–1875), American Civil War soldier
- James E. Thompson Jr. (James Edward Thompson Jr., 1935–2017), U.S. Army general
- James H. Thompson (James Harry Thompson, 1824–1896), American soldier, surgeon and recipient of the Medal of Honor

== Politics and public servants ==
- James Thompson (Australian politician) (1824–1899), member of the New South Wales Legislative Assembly, 1856–1857
- James Thompson (Canadian politician), member of the Ontario Provincial Parliament
- James Thompson (civil servant) (1848–1929), Acting Governor of Madras
- James Thompson (judge) (1806–1874), congressman and Chief Justice of the Supreme Court of Pennsylvania
- James Thompson (Kansas politician), congressional candidate in Kansas in 2018
- James A. Thompson (New York politician) (c. 1873–1923), New York state senator
- James A. Thompson (Texas politician), mayor of Sugar Land, Texas
- James Banford Thompson (1832–1901), member of the New South Wales Legislative Assembly, 1877–1881
- James E. W. Thompson (James Edwin Wallace Thompson, 1879–1958), Canadian politician in the Legislative Assembly of British Columbia
- James Frederick Thompson (1884–1966), member of the New Zealand Legislative Council
- James G. Thompson (New York politician) (1829–1892)
- James Harold Thompson (born 1944), American politician in Florida
- James T. Thompson (James Thomas Thompson, 1849–1921), mayor of Birkenhead, England, c. 1899
- Jim Thompson (Illinois politician) (James R. Thompson, 1936–2020), governor of Illinois
- Jim Thompson (Kentucky politician) (James Hamilton Thompson, born 1948), member of the Kentucky House of Representatives
- Jim Thompson (Oregon politician), member of the Oregon House of Representatives
- Kwasi Thompson (James Kwasi Malik Thompson, born 1975), Bahamian politician

== Religion ==
- James Thompson (martyr) (died 1582), Catholic priest hanged under Elizabeth I
- James Denton Thompson (1856–1924), Bishop of Sodor and Man
- Jim Thompson (bishop) (James Lawton Thompson, 1936–2003), Anglican bishop of Stepney and Bath and Wells

== Sports and games ==
=== Association football ===
- James Thompson (footballer) (James William Thompson, 1898–1984), English footballer, manager and scout
- Jimmy Thompson (footballer, born 1899) (1899–1961), English footballer
- Jimmy Thompson (footballer, born 1935), English footballer
- Jimmy Thompson (footballer, born 1943) (James Butters Thompson, 1943–2020), English footballer (Grimsby Town)

=== Rugby ===
- Jimmy Thompson (rugby league) (James Thompson, born c. 1948), British rugby league footballer
- Jim Thompson (rugby union) (James Gordon Thompson, born 1984), Scottish rugby union player
- James Thompson (rugby union) (born 1999), New Zealand rugby union player

=== Water sports ===
- James Thompson (swimmer) (James Gilmour Thompson, 1906–1966), Canadian swimmer at the 1928 Olympics
- James Thompson (rower) (born 1986), South African rower
- Jim Thompson (powerboat racing) (James G. Thompson, 1926–2021), Canadian businessman, philanthropist, and sportsman

=== Other sports and games ===
- James Thompson (American football) (James Thompson III, born 1953), American football player
- James Thompson Jr. (born 2002), American football player
- James Thompson (chess player) (1804–1870), American chess master
- James Thompson (cricketer) (born 1961), Nevisian cricketer
- James Thompson (fighter) (born 1978), English mixed martial artist
- James Thompson (judoka) (born 1964), American judoka
- James Thompson (racing driver) (Edward James Thompson, born 1974), English racing driver
- James Thompson (table tennis) (1889–?), English table tennis player
- Jim Thompson (coach) (born 1949), founder and executive director of Positive Coaching Alliance and author
- Jim Thomson (ice hockey, born 1965) (James B. Thomson), Canadian ice hockey player
- J. B. Thompson (James Bogne Thompson, 1829–1877), co-creator of the laws of Australian rules football
- Sandy Thompson (James Thompson, 1895–1965), American baseball player

== Other people ==
- James Thompson (Rector of Lincoln College, Oxford) (1802–1860)
- Jimmy Thompson (executioner) (James H. Thompson, 1895–1952), Mississippi executioner active 1940–1950
- James Richard "Ricky" Thompson Jr., perpetrator of the murders of John Goosey and Stacy Barnett in 2009

== See also ==
- James Thomson (disambiguation)
