= James Thomson =

James, Jamie, Jim, or Jimmy Thomson may refer to:

== Arts and letters ==
- James Thomson (architect, born 1852) (1852–1927), Scottish architect, city architect of Dundee
- James Thomson (poet, born 1700) (1700–1748), Scottish poet and playwright
- James Thomson (weaver poet) (1763–1832), Scottish poet
- James Thomson (cabinetmaker) (1825-1896), Scottish-born Canadian cabinetmaker
- James Thomson (poet, born 1834) (1834–1882), Scottish poet and essayist
- James Thomson (engraver) (1788–1850), English engraver, known for his portraits
- James Thomson (journalist) (1852–1934), Australian journalist and newspaper owner
- James Thomson (minister) (1768–1855), Scottish editor of the Encyclopædia Britannica
- James M. Thomson (newspaper publisher) (1878–1959), American newspaper publisher
- Jamie Thomson (author) (born 1958), author of gamebooks

== Politicians ==
- James Thomson (Australian politician) (1856–?), New South Wales politician
- James Thomson (London politician) (born 1966), Common Councilman, Walbrook ward
- James Thomson (Manitoba politician) (1854–?), politician in Manitoba, Canada
- James Thomson (Pittsburgh mayor) (1790–1876), US political figure
- James Thomson (Victorian politician) (1797–1859), pastoralist and politician in colonial Victoria
- James C. Thomson Jr. (1931–2002), American statesman, historian, journalist, and activist
- James Francis Thomson (1891–1973), American politician from Michigan
- James M. Thomson (Virginia politician) (1924–2001), American politician in the Virginia House of Delegates
- James William Thomson (1828–1907), New Zealand politician

== Sciences and mathematics ==
- James Thomson (calico printer) (1779–1850), English industrial chemist
- James Thomson (cell biologist) (born 1958), stem cell researcher
- James Thomson (engineer) (1822–1892), engineer and professor, older brother of William Thomson, 1st Baron Kelvin
- James Thomson (entomologist) (1828–1897), American entomologist
- James Thomson (mathematician) (1786–1849), Irish professor of mathematics, father of William Thomson, 1st Baron Kelvin
- Allan Thomson (geologist) (James Allan Thomson, 1881–1928), New Zealand geologist, scientific administrator and museum director
- James Bates Thomson (1808–1883), American mathematician, educator, and author
- James Thomson (surgeon) (1823-1854), Scottish war surgeon

== Sports ==
=== Association footballers ===
- James J. Thomson (1851–1915), Scottish footballer who played in the first international football match (1872)
- Jimmy Thomson (footballer, born 1884) (1884-1959), Scottish footballer, see List of Bury F.C. players (25–99 appearances)
- James Thomson (footballer, fl. 1912–1928), Scottish footballer who played for Manchester United before World War I
- James Thomson (Queen's Park footballer), Scottish footballer
- Jimmy Thomson (footballer, born 1937) (1937–2012), Scottish football player and manager
- Jimmy Thomson (footballer, born 1948), Scottish football player (Newcastle United)
- Jim Thomson (footballer, born 1946), Scottish footballer who played for Burnley
- Jim Thomson (footballer, born 1971), Scottish footballer who played for Arbroath, Clyde, Stenhousemuir and Queen of the South where he was Captain

=== Other sports ===
- James Thomson (Australian rules footballer) (born 1988)
- James Thomson (cricketer) (1852–1890), New Zealand cricketer
- Jim Thomson (cricketer) (1933–2022), New Zealand cricketer
- James Thomson (rower) (1910–1962), American Olympic rower
- Jim Thomson (ice hockey, born 1965), Canadian ice hockey player
- Jimmy Thomson (golfer) (1908–1985), Scottish-American professional golfer
- Jimmy Thomson (ice hockey, born 1927) (1927–1991), Canadian ice hockey player who captained the Toronto Maple Leafs

== Other ==
- James Thomson (executive), CEO of RAND Corporation
- James Beveridge Thomson (1902–1983), Chief Justice of the Federal Court of Malaysia
- James F. Thomson (philosopher) (1921–1984), English philosopher
- James Noel Thomson (1888–1979), officer in the British Indian Army during World War II
- James S. Thomson (1892–1972), President of the University of Saskatchewan and Moderator of the United Church of Canada
- James Turnbull Thomson (1810–1876), publican and brewer, founder of Balhannah, South Australia
- James Stuart Thomson (1868–1932), Scottish zoologist
- James Thomson (pastor), Scottish Baptist pastor and educator

== See also ==
- James Thompson (disambiguation)
- Jamie Thompson (disambiguation)
