= Jamie Thompson =

Jamie Thompson also refer to:

- Jamie Thompson (American football) (born 1983), American football player
- Jamie Thompson (cricketer) (born 1991), English cricketer
- Jamie Thompson (footballer) (1892–1975), Australian rules footballer
- Jamie Thompson (musician), Canadian musician
- Jamie Thompson (politician), American politician from Michigan
- Jamie Thompson (RAF officer), British Royal Air Force officer

== See also ==
- Jamie Thomson (disambiguation)
- James Thompson (disambiguation)
