= United States prisoners of war during the Vietnam War =

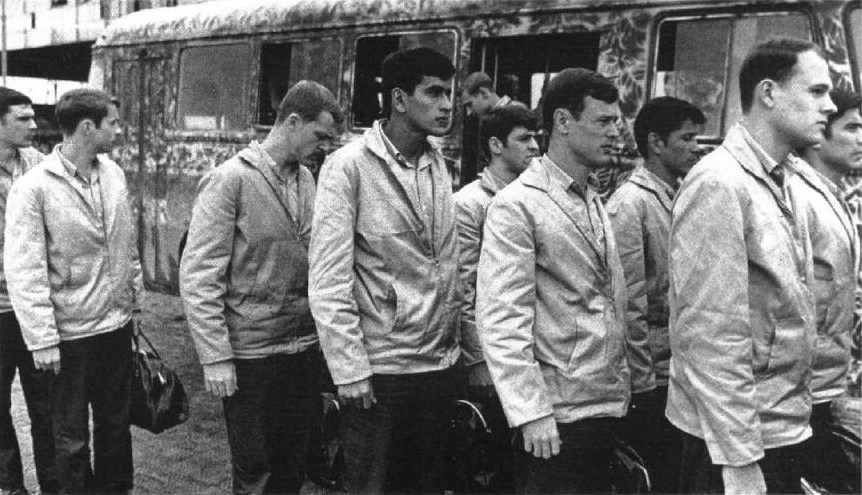
American POWs in North Vietnam lining up for release on March 27, 1973.

Members of the United States armed forces were held as prisoners of war (POWs) in significant numbers during the Vietnam War from 1964 to 1973. Unlike U.S. service members captured in World War II and the Korean War, who were mostly enlisted troops, the overwhelming majority of Vietnam-era POWs were officers, most of them Navy, Air Force, and Marine Corps airmen; a relatively small number of Army enlisted personnel were also captured, as well as one enlisted Navy seaman, Petty Officer Doug Hegdahl, who fell overboard from a naval vessel. Most U.S. prisoners were captured and held in North Vietnam by the People's Army of Vietnam (PAVN); a much smaller number were captured in the south and held by the Việt Cộng (VC). A handful of U.S. civilians were also held captive during the war.

Thirteen prisons and prison camps were used to house U.S. prisoners in North Vietnam, the most widely known of which was Hỏa Lò Prison (nicknamed the "Hanoi Hilton"). The treatment and ultimate fate of U.S. prisoners of war in Vietnam became a subject of widespread concern in the United States, and hundreds of thousands of Americans wore POW bracelets with the name and capture date of imprisoned U.S. service members.

American POWs in North Vietnam were released in early 1973 as part of Operation Homecoming, the result of diplomatic negotiations concluding U.S. military involvement in Vietnam. On February 12, 1973, the first of 591 U.S. prisoners began to be repatriated, and return flights continued until late March. After Operation Homecoming, the U.S. still listed roughly 1,350 Americans as prisoners of war or missing in action and sought the return of roughly 1,200 Americans reported killed in action, but whose bodies were not recovered. These missing personnel would become the subject of the Vietnam War POW/MIA issue.

== Phases of captures ==
On March 26, 1964, the first U.S. service member imprisoned during the Vietnam War was captured near Quảng Trị, South Vietnam when an L-19/O-1 Bird Dog observation plane flown by Captain Richard L. Whitesides and Captain Floyd James Thompson was brought down by small arms fire. Whitesides was killed, and Thompson was taken prisoner; he would ultimately spend just short of nine years in captivity, making him the longest-held POW in American history. The first fighter pilot captured in North Vietnam was Navy Lieutenant (junior grade) Everett Alvarez, Jr., who was shot down on August 5, 1964, near the town of Vinh in the aftermath of the Gulf of Tonkin incident. As the first pilot captured by the North Vietnamese, his captors at first seemed unsure what to do with him. He was initially held in the local police jail, as there was no other place to keep him. His meals were take-out brought from local restaurants. He was eventually among the first to be transferred to the repurposed old French Hoa Lo prison, later to be infamously known as the Hanoi Hilton.

American pilots continued to be captured over the north between 1965 and 1968 as part of Operation Rolling Thunder, the sustained aerial bombing campaign against North Vietnam. After President Lyndon Johnson initiated a bombing pause in 1968, the number of new captures dropped significantly, only to pick up again after his successor, President Richard Nixon, resumed bombing in 1969. Significant numbers of Americans were also captured during Operation Linebacker between May and October 1972 and Operation Linebacker II in December 1972, also known as the "Christmas Bombings". They would have the shortest stays in captivity.

== Severe treatment years ==
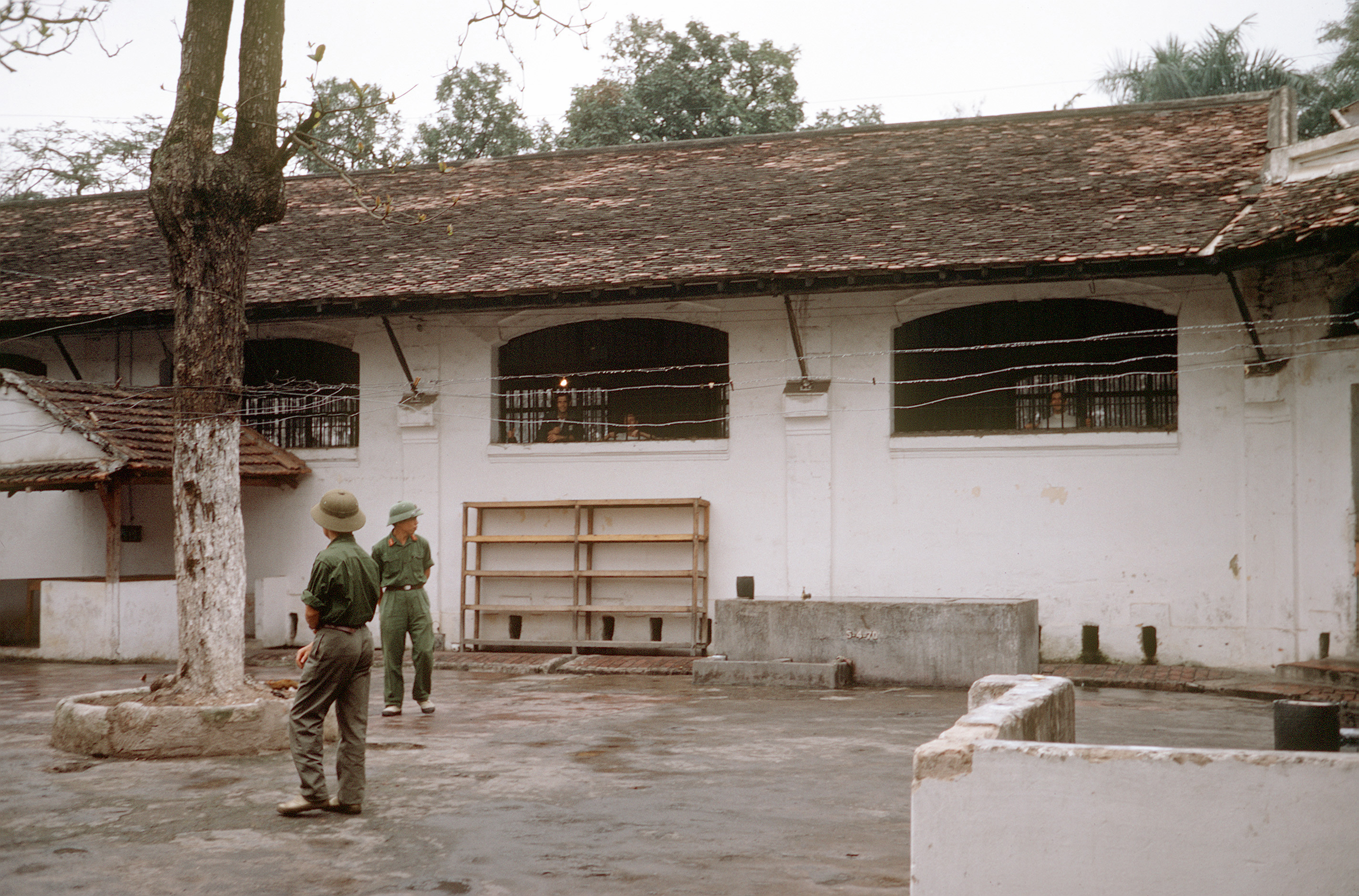
The "Little Vegas" area of Hỏa Lò Prison, built for American POWs in 1967. Shown in a final inspection in 1973 shortly before the Americans' release.

Beginning in late 1965, the application of torture against U.S. prisoners of war became severe. During the first six years in which U.S. prisoners of war were held in North Vietnam, many experienced long periods of solitary confinement, with senior leaders and particularly recalcitrant POWs being isolated to prevent communication. Robinson Risner and James Stockdale, two senior officers who were the de facto leaders of the POWs, were held in solitary for three and four years, respectively. The Alcatraz Gang was a group of eleven POWs who were held separately because of their particular resistance to their captors.

The POWs made extensive use of a tap code to communicate, which was introduced in June 1965 by four POWs held in the Hỏa Lò: Captain Carlyle "Smitty" Harris, Lieutenant Phillip Butler, Lieutenant Robert Peel and Lieutenant Commander Robert Shumaker. Harris had remembered the code from prior training and taught it to his fellow prisoners. The code was simple and easy to learn and could be taught without verbal instructions. In addition to allowing communication between walls, the prisoners used the code when sitting next to each other but forbidden from speaking by tapping on one another's bodies. Throughout the war the tap code was instrumental in maintaining prisoner morale, as well as preserving a cohesive military structure despite North Vietnamese attempts to disrupt the POW's chain of command. During periods of protracted isolation the tap code facilitated elaborate mental projects to keep the prisoners' sanity.

U.S. prisoners of war in North Vietnam were subjected to extreme torture and malnutrition during their captivity. Although North Vietnam was a signatory of the Third Geneva Convention of 1949, which demanded "decent and humane treatment" of prisoners of war, severe torture methods were employed, such as waterboarding, strappado (known as "the ropes" to POWs), irons, beatings, and prolonged solitary confinement. The aim of the torture was usually not acquiring military information. Rather, it was to break the will of the prisoners of war, both individually and as a group. The goal of the North Vietnamese was to get written or recorded statements from the prisoners that criticized U.S. conduct of the war and praised how the North Vietnamese treated them. Such POW statements would be viewed as a propaganda victory in the battle to sway world and U.S. domestic opinion against the U.S. war effort.

During one such event in 1966, then-Commander Jeremiah Denton, a captured Navy pilot, was forced to appear at a televised press conference, where he famously blinked the word "T-O-R-T-U-R-E" with his eyes in Morse code, confirming to U.S. intelligence that U.S. prisoners of war were being tortured. Two months later, in what became known as the Hanoi March, 52 American POWs were paraded through the streets of Hanoi before thousands of North Vietnamese civilians. The march soon deteriorated into near riot conditions, with North Vietnamese civilians beating the POWs along the 2 miles (3.2 km) route and their guards largely unable to restrain the attacks.

To stop the torture, prisoners would often lie or make up stories to get their captors to end the abuse. One captured pilot, when asked what his mission was, claimed that he'd been ordered to bomb North Vietnams largest brewery to damage the morale of their military. American recon flights soon afterwards noticed an increase in anti-aircraft artillery around it. Another pilot, when asked the names of other members of his squadron, gave the real names of several American comic book superheroes instead.

In the end, North Vietnamese torture was sufficiently brutal and prolonged that nearly every American POW so subjected made a statement of some kind at some time. As John McCain later wrote of finally being forced to make an anti-American statement: "I had learned what we all learned over there: Every man has his breaking point. I had reached mine." Only a small number of exceptionally resilient prisoners of war, such as John A. Dramesi, survived captivity without ever cooperating with the enemy; others who refused to cooperate under any circumstances, such as Edwin Atterbury, were tortured to death. James Stockdale, fearing that he might reveal details of the Gulf of Tonkin incident if tortured, attempted suicide, but survived; he never revealed this information to the enemy. Under these extreme conditions, many prisoners of war's aim became merely to absorb as much torture as they could before giving in. One later described the internal code the POWs developed, and instructed new arrivals on, as: "Take physical torture until you are right at the edge of losing your ability to be rational. At that point, lie, do, or say whatever you must do to survive. But you first must take physical torture."

After making statements, the POWs would admit to each other what had happened, lest shame or guilt consume them or make them more vulnerable to additional North Vietnamese pressure. Nevertheless, the POWs obsessed over what they had done, and would years after their release still be haunted by the "confessions" or other statements they had made. As another POW later said, "To this day I get angry with myself. But we did the best we could. [We realize], over time, that we all fall short of what we aspire to be. And that is where forgiveness comes in."

The North Vietnamese occasionally released prisoners of war for propaganda or other purposes. The POWs had a "first in, first out" interpretation of the Code of the U.S. Fighting Force, meaning they could only accept release in the order they had been captured, but making an exception for those seriously sick or badly injured. When a few captured servicemen began to be released from North Vietnamese prisons during the Johnson administration, their testimonies revealed widespread and systematic abuse of prisoners of war. Initially, this information was downplayed by American authorities for fear that conditions might worsen for those remaining in North Vietnamese custody. Policy changed under the Nixon administration, when mistreatment of the prisoners was publicized by U.S. Secretary of Defense Melvin Laird and others.

== Later years ==
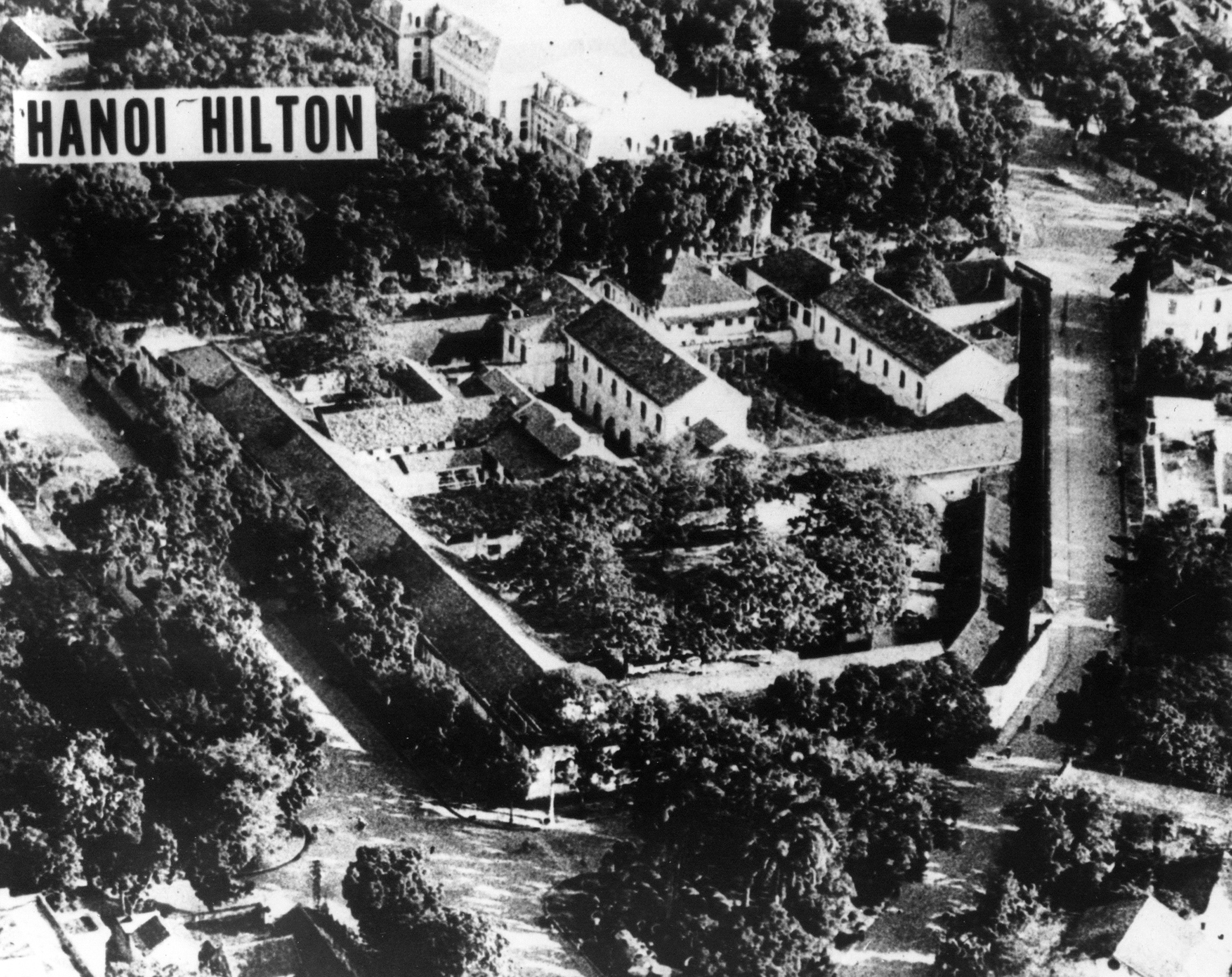
The Hanoi Hilton in a 1970 aerial surveillance photo.

Beginning in October 1969, the torture regime suddenly abated to a great extent, and life for the prisoners became less severe and generally more tolerable. North Vietnamese leader Ho Chi Minh had died the previous month, possibly causing a change in policy towards POWs. Many POWs speculated that Ho had been personally responsible for their mistreatment. Also, a badly beaten and weakened POW who had been released that summer disclosed to the world press the conditions to which they were being subjected, and the National League of Families of American Prisoners and Missing in Southeast Asia heightened awareness of the POWs' plight.

Despite several escape attempts, no U.S. POW successfully escaped from a North Vietnamese prison, although James N. Rowe successfully escaped from North Vietnamese captivity. On November 21, 1970, U.S. Special Forces launched Operation Ivory Coast in an attempt to rescue 61 POWs believed to be held at the Sơn Tây prison camp 23 miles (37 km) west of Hanoi. Fifty-six commandos landed by helicopter and assaulted the prison, but the prisoners had been moved some months earlier and none were rescued. While the raid failed to free any POWs and was considered a significant intelligence failure, it had several positive implications for American prisoners. The most immediate effect was to affirm to the POWs that their government was actively attempting to repatriate them, which significantly boosted their morale. Additionally, soon after the raid all acknowledged American prisoners in North Vietnam were moved to Hỏa Lò so that the North Vietnamese had fewer camps to protect and to prevent their rescue by U.S. forces.

The post-raid consolidation brought many prisoners who had spent years in isolation into large cells holding roughly 70 men each. This created the "Camp Unity" communal living area at Hỏa Lò. The increased human contact further improved morale and facilitated greater military cohesion among the POWs. At this time, the prisoners formally organized themselves under the 4th Allied POW Wing, whose name acknowledged earlier periods of overseas captivity among American military personnel in World War I, World War II and the Korean War. This military structure was ultimately recognized by the North Vietnamese and endured until the prisoners' release in 1973.

Nevertheless, by 1971, some 30–50 percent of the POWs had become disillusioned about the war, both because of the apparent lack of military progress and what they heard of the growing anti-war movement in the U.S. and some of them were less reluctant to make propaganda statements for the North Vietnamese. Others were not among them; there were defiant church services and an effort to write letters home that only portrayed the camp in a negative light. Such prisoners were sometimes sent to a camp reserved for "bad attitude" cases.

At the "Hanoi Hilton", POWs cheered the resumed bombing of North Vietnam starting in April 1972, whose targets included the Hanoi area. The old-time POWs cheered even more during the intense "Christmas Bombing" campaign of December 1972, when Hanoi was subjected for the first time to repeated B-52 Stratofortress raids. Although its explosions lit the night sky and shook the walls of the camp, scaring some of the newer POWs, most saw it as a forceful measure to compel North Vietnam to finally come to terms.

== North Vietnamese prisons ==
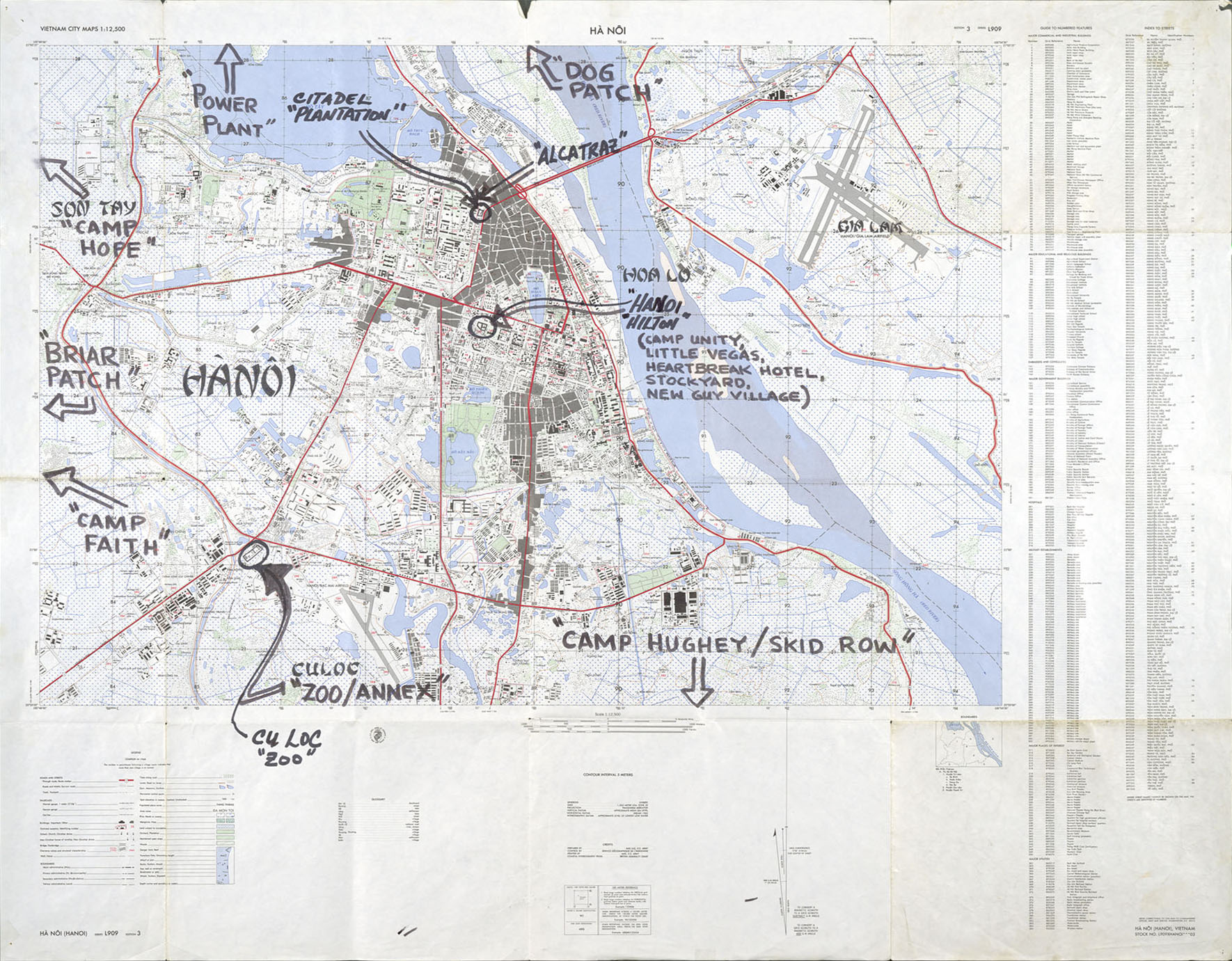
Shortly after the war, ex-POW Mike McGrath annotated this detailed map of Hanoi to show the location of prisons. He did it so he would not forget where the camps were.

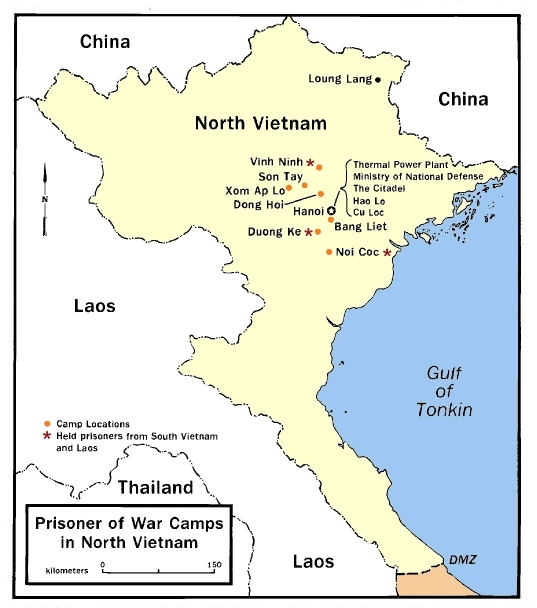
A U.S. Marine Corps map showing POW camp locations, using Vietnamese names rather than the American prisoners' names for them.

Of the 13 prisons used to incarcerate POWs, five were located in Hanoi, and the remainder were situated outside the city.

- Alcatraz. Located in north central Hanoi, Alcatraz was used to detain 11 particularly defiant American prisoners known as the Alcatraz Gang, including Jeremiah Denton, future U.S. Senator from Alabama, Sam Johnson, future U.S. Representative from Texas and James Stockdale, later a Vice Admiral and recipient of the Medal of Honor.
- Briarpatch. The Briarpatch camp, located 33 miles (53 km) northwest of Hanoi, intermittently held U.S. prisoners between 1965 and 1971. Conditions at the Briarpatch were notoriously grim, even by the standards of North Vietnamese prisons. Multiple POWs contracted beriberi at the camp due to severe malnutrition.
- Camp Faith. Located 9 miles (14 km) west of Hanoi, Camp Faith became operational in July 1970, when a major consolidation of U.S. prisoners began. At its peak, the population of Camp Faith was approximately 220 POWs. Three days after the Sơn Tây Raid, Camp Faith POWs were moved to Hỏa Lò prison in Hanoi.
- Camp Hope, also known as Sơn Tây, was operational between 1968 and 1970, holding 55 POWs. The camp was closed following the Sơn Tây Raid.
- Dirty Bird. Beginning in June 1967, several locations in the immediate vicinity of the Hanoi Thermal Power Plant were used to house POWs. Approximately 30 Americans were held at the Dirty Bird Camp, possibly in an attempt to prevent the bombing of the power plant. In October 1967, all prisoners held in Dirty Bird were removed to regular POW camps.
- Dogpatch. The Dogpatch camp, located 105 miles (169 km) northeast of Hanoi, opened in May 1972, when 220 POWs were transferred there from Hỏa Lò prison. The camp ceased operation in early 1973, when the POWs were transferred to Hanoi for repatriation to the United States.
- Farnsworth. Located 18 miles (29 km) southwest of Hanoi, Farnsworth became operational in August 1968, when 28 U.S. POWs captured outside North Vietnam were moved to this location. Over the next two years, several groups of POWs captured outside of North Vietnam were brought to the camp. Following the Sơn Tây Raid, Farnsworth's prisoner population was transferred to the Plantation Camp in Hanoi.
- Hỏa Lò Prison, also known as the Hanoi Hilton. Located in downtown Hanoi, Hỏa Lò prison was first used by the French colonists to hold political prisoners in what was then French Indochina. The prison became operational during the Vietnam War when it was used to house Everett Alvarez, Jr., the first American pilot captured in North Vietnam. The prison was used without interruption until the repatriation of U.S. POWs in 1973.
- Mountain Camp. The Mountain Camp, located 40 miles (64 km) northwest of Hanoi, became operational in December 1971, when one prisoner from Hỏa Lò and eight prisoners from Skidrow were moved to this location. This camp was used until January 1973 when its POW population was permanently moved to Hanoi for repatriation.
- The Plantation. Located in northeast Hanoi, the Plantation opened in June 1967. It was a Potemkin village-style camp run by the North Vietnamese as a propaganda showplace for foreign visitors to see and as a preparation camp for prisoners about to be released. Physical mistreatment of prisoners was rarer than in other camps, but did occur to some Plantation prisoners. The camp operated until July 1970, when a major consolidation of U.S. POWs occurred.
- Rockpile. The Rockpile camp, located 32 miles (51 km) south of Hanoi, became operational in June 1971 when 14 Americans and foreign POWs captured outside North Vietnam were moved from Skidrow to the Rockpile. The camp was closed in February 1973, when its POWs were moved to Hanoi for repatriation.
- Skidrow. The Skidrow camp, located 6 miles (9.7 km) southwest of Hanoi, became operational as a U.S. POW detention facility in July 1968, when U.S. civilian and military prisoners captured outside North Vietnam were moved there.
- The Zoo. Located in the suburbs of Hanoi, the Zoo opened in September 1965 and remained operational until December 1970, when all U.S. prisoners were transferred to Hỏa Lò prison.

== Notable Vietnam-era POWs ==
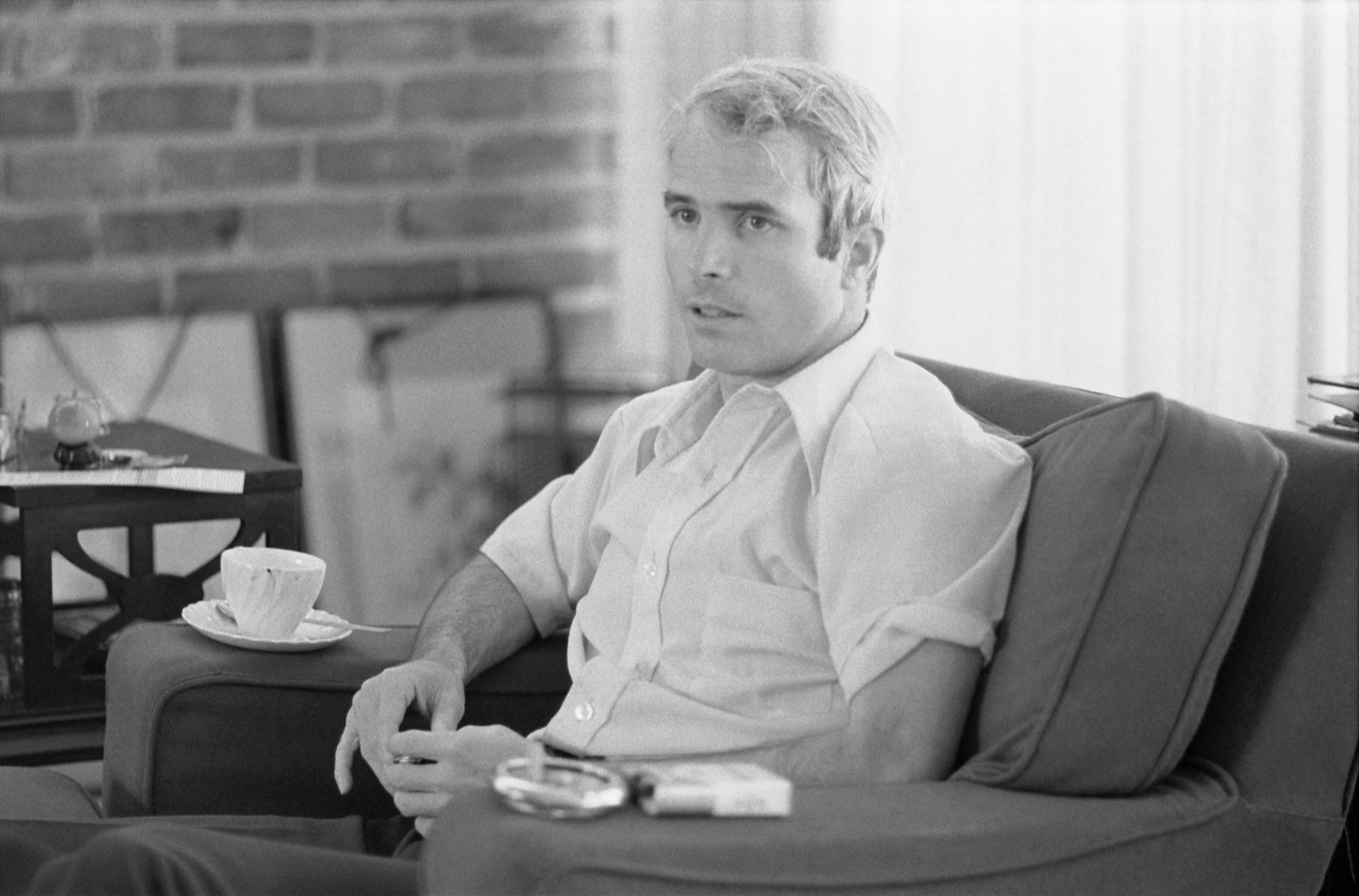
John McCain III giving an interview to the press about his time as a POW on April 24, 1973, soon after his return from Vietnam.

- Everett Alvarez, Jr., USN pilot, the first American airman shot down over North Vietnam and the second longest held prisoner of war in American history.
- John L. Borling, USAF pilot, retired Major General.
- Charles G. Boyd, USAF pilot, recipient of the Air Force Cross, and the only Vietnam-era POW to reach the four-star rank.
- Ralph T. Browning, USAF pilot, retired Brigadier General, Silver Star recipient.
- Edward A. Brudno, USAF pilot, Silver Star recipient.
- Phillip N. Butler, USN pilot the 8th longest-held POW in North Vietnam, served as president of Veterans for Peace after the war was over.
- Fred V. Cherry, USAF pilot, veteran of the Korean War, recipient of the Air Force Cross, and the senior African American prisoner held in North Vietnam.
- George Coker, USN bombardier-navigator, recipient of the Navy Cross.
- Donald Cook, USMC military advisor with the South Vietnamese Marine Corps. Awarded the Medal of Honor posthumously.
- Bud Day, USAF pilot, recipient of both the Medal of Honor and the Air Force Cross.
- Jeremiah Denton, USN pilot, recipient of the Navy Cross, former U.S. Senator from Alabama.
- John P. Flynn, USAF pilot, retired Lieutenant General and recipient of the Air Force Cross.
- John W. Frederick, Jr., USMC radar intercept officer, veteran of four wars, recipient of the Navy Cross. Died in captivity in 1972.
- Larry Guarino, USAF pilot, veteran of three wars, recipient of the Air Force Cross.
- Doug Hegdahl, USN, released on 5 August 1969 and gave US intelligence the names of 256 US prisoners.
- Sam Johnson, USAF pilot, veteran of the Korean and Vietnam Wars, member of the U.S. House of Representatives.
- James H. Kasler, USAF pilot, veteran of three wars, jet ace during the Korean War, and the only individual to be awarded the Air Force Cross three times.
- Richard P. Keirn, USAF pilot, prisoner of war in both World War II and the Vietnam War.
- Joe Kernan, USN pilot, Governor of Indiana
- Joseph Kittinger, USAF pilot, prior high altitude research pilot who executed a record freefall parachute jump in 1960, recipient of two Silver Stars.
- Charles Klusmann, USN pilot, the first American airman shot down in the Vietnam War over Laos and the first to escape.
- William P. Lawrence, USN pilot, retired Vice Admiral; Commander U.S. Third Fleet, Superintendent of U.S. Naval Academy, Navy Cross recipient.
- James Lewis, USA Green Beret; CIA agent where he became a POW, quoted as "the last American prisoner of war to come home." by Kai Bird
- Hayden Lockhart, first US Air Force pilot to become a POW.
- John McCain III, USN pilot, U.S. Senator from Arizona, and the 2008 Republican presidential nominee.
- Pete Peterson, USAF pilot, three-term member of the U.S. House of Representatives, and the first U.S. Ambassador to Vietnam.
- Jon A. Reynolds, USAF pilot, retired Brigadier General.
- James Robinson Risner, USAF pilot, retired Brigadier General, two-time recipient of the Air Force Cross.
- James N. Rowe, USA Special Forces officer, held by the Viet Cong from October 1963 until escaping in December 1968.
- Robert H. Shumaker, USN pilot, retired Rear Admiral.
- Lance Sijan, USAF pilot, posthumous recipient of the Medal of Honor. Died in captivity in 1968.
- James Stockdale, USN pilot, retired Vice Admiral and recipient of the Medal of Honor. Running mate for Ross Perot's 1992 Presidential campaign as an Independent.
- Orson Swindle, USMC pilot, former Commissioner of the Federal Trade Commission.
- Floyd Thompson, USA Special Forces, POW for nearly nine years, and the longest held prisoner of war in American history.
- Leo K. Thorsness, USAF pilot, recipient of the Medal of Honor.
- Humbert Roque Versace, USA Special Forces, first POW to be awarded the Medal of Honor for actions as a prisoner. Was executed in captivity in 1965.

== Post-war accounts ==
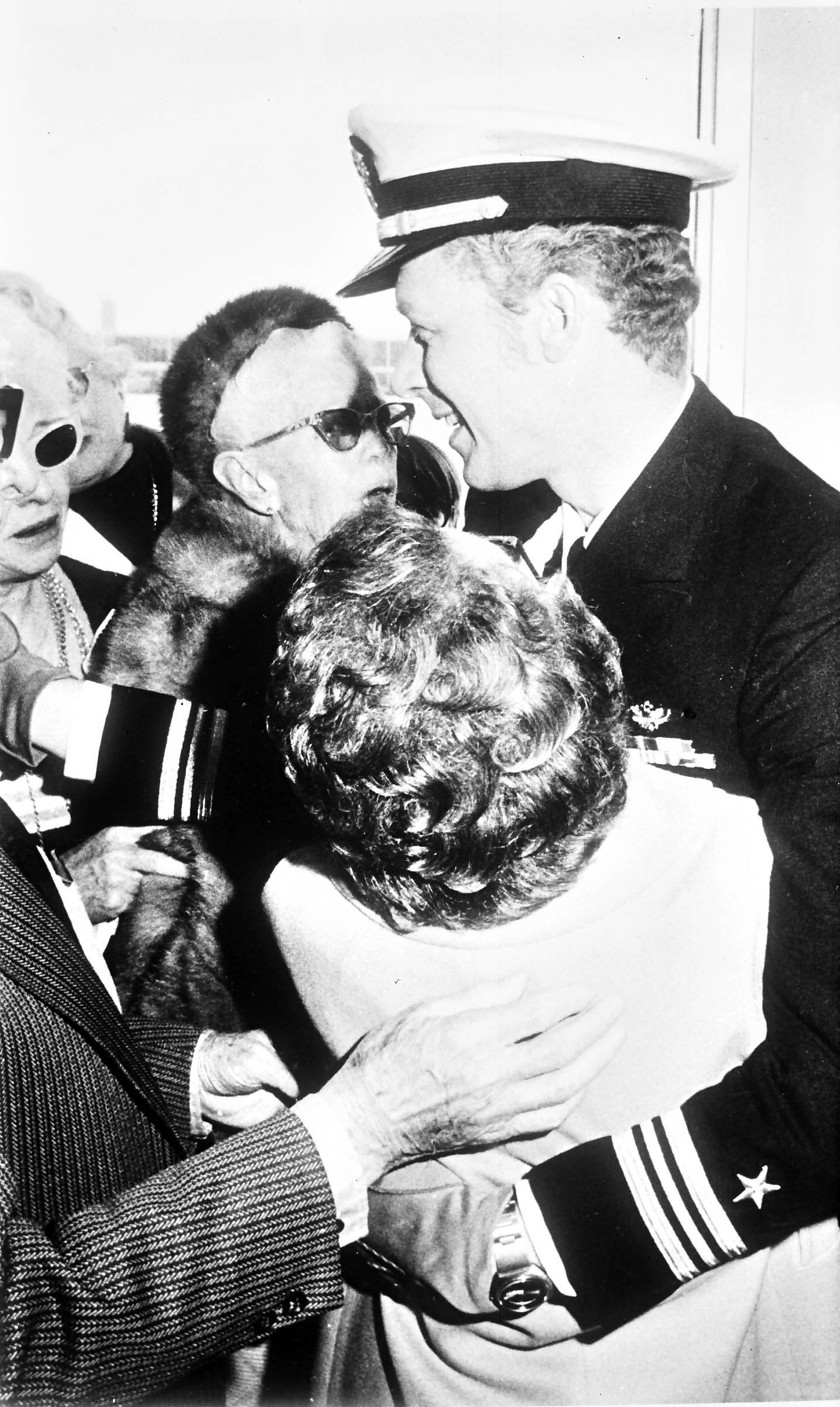
1973 Homecoming: Navy flier Phil Butler greets his family in Tulsa, Oklahoma after 7 years and 10 months as a POW in North Vietnam

After the implementation of the 1973 Paris Peace Accords, neither the United States nor its allies ever formally charged North Vietnam with the war crimes revealed to have been committed there. Extradition of North Vietnamese officials who had violated the Geneva Convention, which they had always insisted officially did not bind them because their nation had never signed it, was not a condition of the U.S. withdrawal from South Vietnam and ultimate abandonment of the South Vietnamese government. In the 2000s, the Vietnamese government has held the position that claims that prisoners were tortured during the war are fabricated, but that Vietnam wants to move past the issue as part of establishing better relations with the U.S. Bùi Tín, a North Vietnamese Army colonel-later turned dissident and exile, who believed that the cause behind the war had been just but that the country's political system had lost its way after reunification, maintained in 2000 that no torture had occurred in the POW camps. Tin stated that there were "a few physical hits like a slap across the face, or threats, in order to obtain the specific confessions," and that the worst that especially resistant prisoners such as Stockdale and Jeremiah Denton encountered was being confined to small cells. Tran Trong Duyet, a jailer at Hoa Lo beginning in 1968 and its commandant for the last three years of the war, maintained in 2008 that no prisoners were tortured. However, eyewitness accounts by American servicemen present a different account of their captivity.

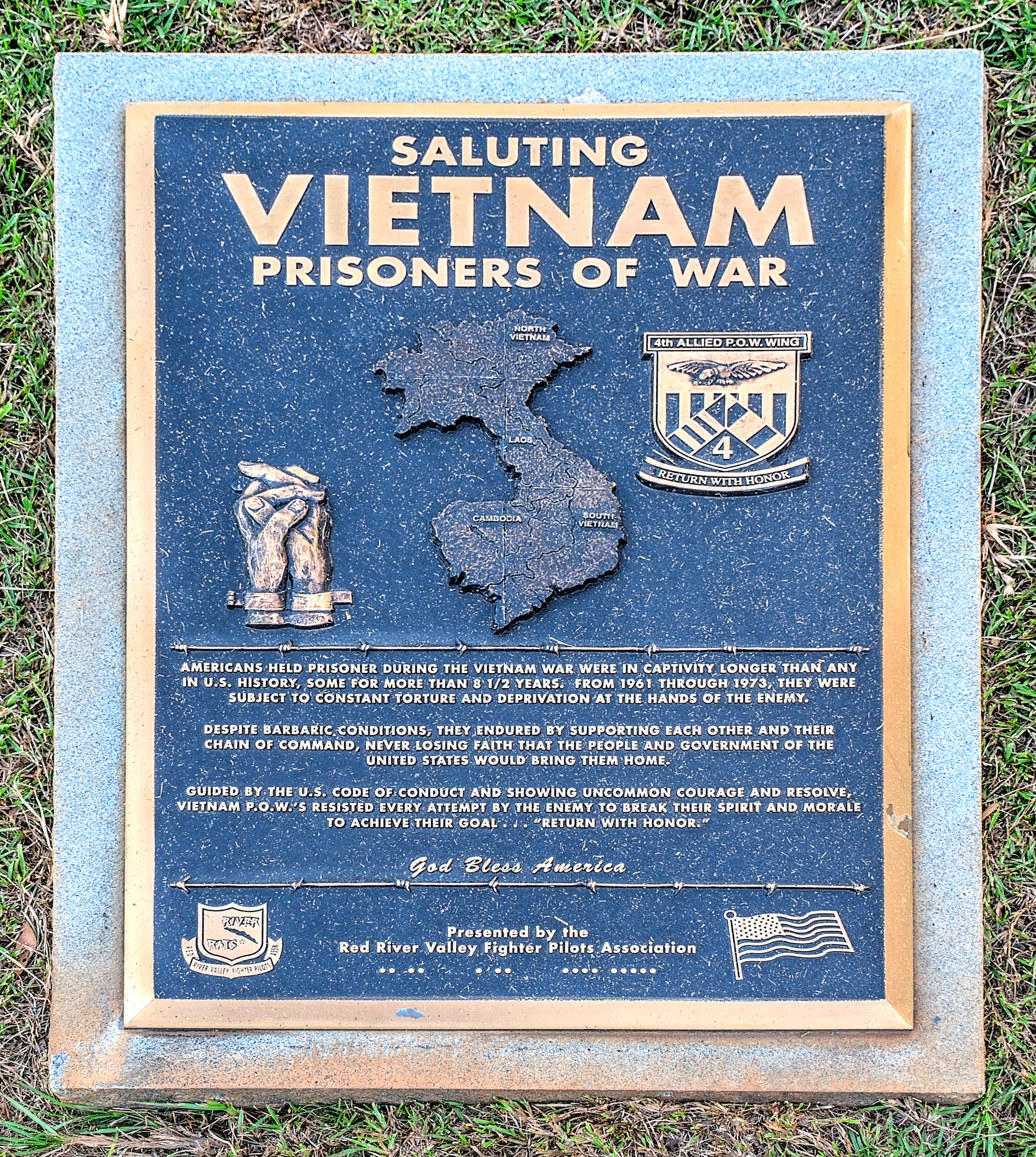
Memorial at Andersonville National Historic Site.

After the war, Risner wrote the book Passing of the Night detailing his seven years at the Hanoi Hilton. Indeed, a considerable literature emerged from released POWs after repatriation, depicting Hoa Lo and the other prisons as places where such atrocities as murder; beatings; broken bones, teeth and eardrums; dislocated limbs; starvation; serving of food contaminated with human and animal feces; and medical neglect of infections and tropical disease occurred. These details are revealed in accounts by McCain (Faith of My Fathers), Denton, Alvarez, Day, Risner, Stockdale and dozens of others. The Hanoi Hilton was depicted in the 1987 Hollywood movie The Hanoi Hilton.

In addition to memoirs, the U.S. POW experience in Vietnam was the subject of two in-depth accounts by authors and historians, John G. Hubbell's P.O.W.: A Definitive History of the American Prisoner-of-War Experience in Vietnam, 1964–1973 (published 1976) and Stuart Rochester and Frederick Kiley's Honor Bound: American Prisoners of War in Southeast Asia, 1961–1973 (published 1999).

== Cultural representations ==
The Vietnam War Song Project has identified 160+ songs related to P.O.W.s, released during both the war and post-war years.

== Bibliography ==
- Brace, Ernest C. (1988). A Code to Keep: The true story of America's longest held civilian prisoner of war in Vietnam. St. Martin's Press. ISBN 0-7090-3560-8.
- Hubbell, John G. (1976). P.O.W.: A Definitive History of the American Prisoner-Of-War Experience in Vietnam, 1964–1973. New York: Reader's Digest Press. ISBN 0-88349-091-9.
- McCain, John; Salter, Mark (1999). Faith of My Fathers. New York: Random House. ISBN 0-375-50191-6.
- Rochester, Stuart I.; Kiley, Frederick (1999). Honor Bound: American Prisoners of War in Southeast Asia, 1961–1973. Annapolis, Maryland: Naval Institute Press. ISBN 1-55750-694-9.
- Timberg, Robert (1999). John McCain: An American Odyssey. New York: Touchstone Books. ISBN 0-684-86794-X.
- Karnow, Stanley, Vietnam, A History. Viking Press New York, Viking Press 1983, ISBN 0670746045. Penguin Books 1997 ISBN 0140265473.
- Borling, John: Taps on the Walls; Poems from the Hanoi Hilton (2013) Master Wings Publishing Pritzker Military Library
