= James M. Thomson =

James M. Thomson may refer to:

- James M. Thomson (newspaper publisher) (1878–1959), American newspaper publisher
- James M. Thomson (Virginia politician) (1924–2001), American politician in the Virginia House of Delegates

== See also ==
- James Maurice Thompson (1844–1901), American novelist
- James Matthew Thompson (1878–1956), English historian and theologian
