= Ernest C. Brace =

(1931–2014) American aviator

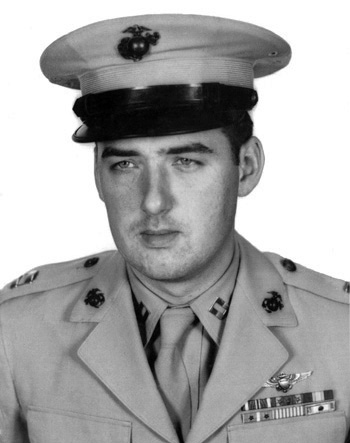
- Born: Ernest Cary Brace; August 15, 1931; Detroit, Michigan
- Died: December 5, 2014 (aged 83); Klamath Falls, Oregon
- Spouse: Patricia Emmons (divorced): Nancy Jorina Rusth
- Military career
- Allegiance: United States of America
- Branch: United States Marine Corps
- Service years: 1947–1961
- Rank: Captain
- Nickname: Ernie
- Conflicts: Korean War; Vietnam War
- Awards: Distinguished Flying Cross; Purple Heart; Air Medal (with 3 stars); Distinguished Public Service Medal; Prisoner of War Medal; Navy Unit Commendation; National Defense Service Medal; Korean Service Medal (with 2 stars); United Nations Korea Medal; Korean Presidential Unit Citation
- Other work: Pilot, BirdAir; Manager, Evergreen International Aviation; Operations Lead, Sikorsky Aircraft

Ernest Cary Brace (August 15, 1931 – December 5, 2014) was the longest-held civilian prisoner of war (POW) during the Vietnam War. A decorated Marine Corps fighter pilot and mustang, Brace was court-martialed in 1961 for attempting to fake his own death. He flew as a civilian contract pilot before being captured in Laos in 1965 while flying supplies for USAID. He spent almost eight years as a POW and upon his release received a Presidential pardon in light of his good conduct.

== Military career ==
Brace was born in Detroit, Michigan, in 1931. He enlisted in the Marine Corps in 1947 at age 15 as an aviation radar and radio technician. He earned his Pilot's Wings and his commission as a Second Lieutenant from the Aviation Cadet School, graduating in August 1951. During his tour in the Korean War (from April 1952 to March 1953), he flew more than 100 missions. While assigned to Marine Attack Squadron 121 in November 1952, Second Lieutenant Brace participated in a dive-bombing attack against a Korean hydroelectric plant. Brace received surface-to-air fire as he took low-altitude reconnaissance imagery of the bombing results. He was able to fly his damaged AD-3 Skyraider clear of the Korean Peninsula, crashing in the Sea of Japan where he was rescued by USS Kidd. For his courage and initiative, Brace was awarded the Distinguished Flying Cross.

Years later, Brace (then a captain) crashed his T-28 Trojan into a cornfield near the mouth of the Choptank River near Cambridge, Maryland, during a training flight on 3 January 1961. He fled the scene but turned himself in ten days later once his empty flight-suit was found hidden in vegetation. Brace faced a court-martial and was charged with deliberately crashing his aircraft and faking his death so that his wife Patricia could collect insurance money to pay off debts. Brace pleaded guilty to unauthorized absence and was acquitted of the deliberate destruction of his aircraft. The court-martial ended his military career.

== Capture ==
Prisoner in a Cage (excerpt)

I'm just a prisoner in a cage;
I have no name, I have no age.
The guards don't even know what I've done,
All they know, I'm a captured one.

My feet are in stocks, my neck tied to a pole,
What food I get is shoved through a hole;
At night I lie down, and my hands are tied,
The rope is stretched to a pole outside.

— Ernest Brace

Brace then worked as a civilian pilot for a number of companies before flying for BirdAir, an airline contracted by the Thai Border Patrol Police. BirdAir also supported USAID interests in Southeast Asia. On 21 May 1965, he flew Royal Thai Army Sergeant Chaicharn, as well as other passengers and cargo to a dirt airstrip in the Northern Laotian village of Baum Lao in Muong Houn District. Brace's aircraft, a Pilatus PC-6 Porter, received small arms fire upon landing, rendering it incapable of taking off again. Both he and Chaicharn were immediately taken prisoner (either by the Vietnam People's Army or the Pathet Lao) and force-marched into the jungle from Boum Lao to Muong Hoc to Doi Sai, near Dien Bien Phu. Brace was held in a bamboo cage with his limbs and neck bound to prevent escape. During his captivity he was beaten, interrogated, and faced with a mock execution. He escaped 6 June 1965 for a few days before being caught stealing food from a village. Upon his return to the cage his legs were put in stocks and bolted. He escaped on 17 April 1966, and was recaptured in minutes. Buried up to his chin for seven days, Brace hit his low point and attempted to hang himself on 10 December 1967. He was sent in October 1968 to a POW camp on the outskirts of Hanoi nicknamed The Plantation, where he met John McCain in the cell next to him. Brace re-tells his story in Season 8 of Locked Up Abroad. Like Jim Bedinger, he was sequestered from other prisoners because he had been captured in Laos. Before Doug Hegdahl's early release from the captivity, Brace contacted Hegdahl to ensure the outside world knew about the prisoners captured in Laos.

== Post-release ==
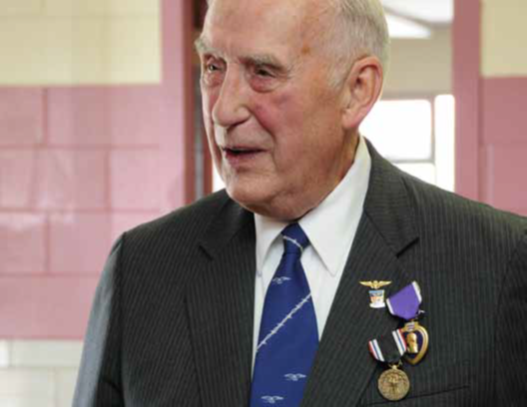
Brace was awarded the Prisoner of War Medal and the Purple Heart at a ceremony on Kingsley Field Air National Guard Base in 2013, forty years after his release.

Brace was released on March 28, 1973, spending 7 years, 10 months and 7 days in captivity, making him the longest-held civilian POW in Vietnam. Brace had not been listed as a prisoner during the past 7 years. His wife Patricia assumed her husband was dead and she remarried; a fact Brace found out at the processing station after his release. While receiving out-patient care in Naval Medical Center San Diego, Brace met a nurse named Nancy stationed there. He married her and moved to her hometown of Klamath Falls, Oregon, where he later resided. In light of Brace's time as a POW, President Gerald Ford issued him a full pardon as well as an honorable discharge from the Marine Corps. Brace, captured as a civilian, was nominated for the Prisoner of War Medal and the Purple Heart by Admiral James Stockdale, the senior officer among US prisoners held during the Vietnam War. Because Department of Defense regulations prohibit civilians from receiving military awards, the nominations were denied four times. In 1978 he was awarded the Department of Defense Distinguished Civilian Service Award. The most recent application in 2011, sent to the office of United States Secretary of the Navy Ray Mabus through fellow former POW John McCain, was successful. Brace commented that "these medals are the ones no one wants to get" as personal suffering is involved in qualifying for them.

Brace worked for a few years in the late 1970s as a manager for Evergreen International Aviation, supporting aviation contracts for the United Nations in South Vietnam, Africa, and Mexico. He went on to work as an operations lead for Sikorsky Aircraft with other overseas contracts. In 2014, Klamath Community College awarded Brace an honorary associate degree in Aviation Science. The college is also considering naming their new veterans' center in his name. He died on December 5, 2014, of a pulmonary embolism. He was cremated and his ashes were scattered over his favorite fishing spot.

== See also ==
- Floyd James Thompson, the longest held POW in United States history, spending nearly nine years in captivity in Vietnam.
- Everett Alvarez Jr. the second longest-held POW in United States history, spending 8.5 years in captivity in Vietnam.
- List of people pardoned or granted clemency by the president of the United States

== Autobiographies ==
- Brace, Ernest C. (1988). A Code to Keep: The true story of America's longest held civilian prisoner of war in Vietnam. New York: St. Martin's Press. ISBN 0-7090-3560-8.
- Brace, Ernest C. (2012). Monkey Paw Soup: And Tales of Drugs, Thugs, Revolution, & War. Ernest C. Brace. ISBN 978-0-615-59019-6.
