= Mark Pattison (academic) =

English author and Church of England priest (1813–1884)

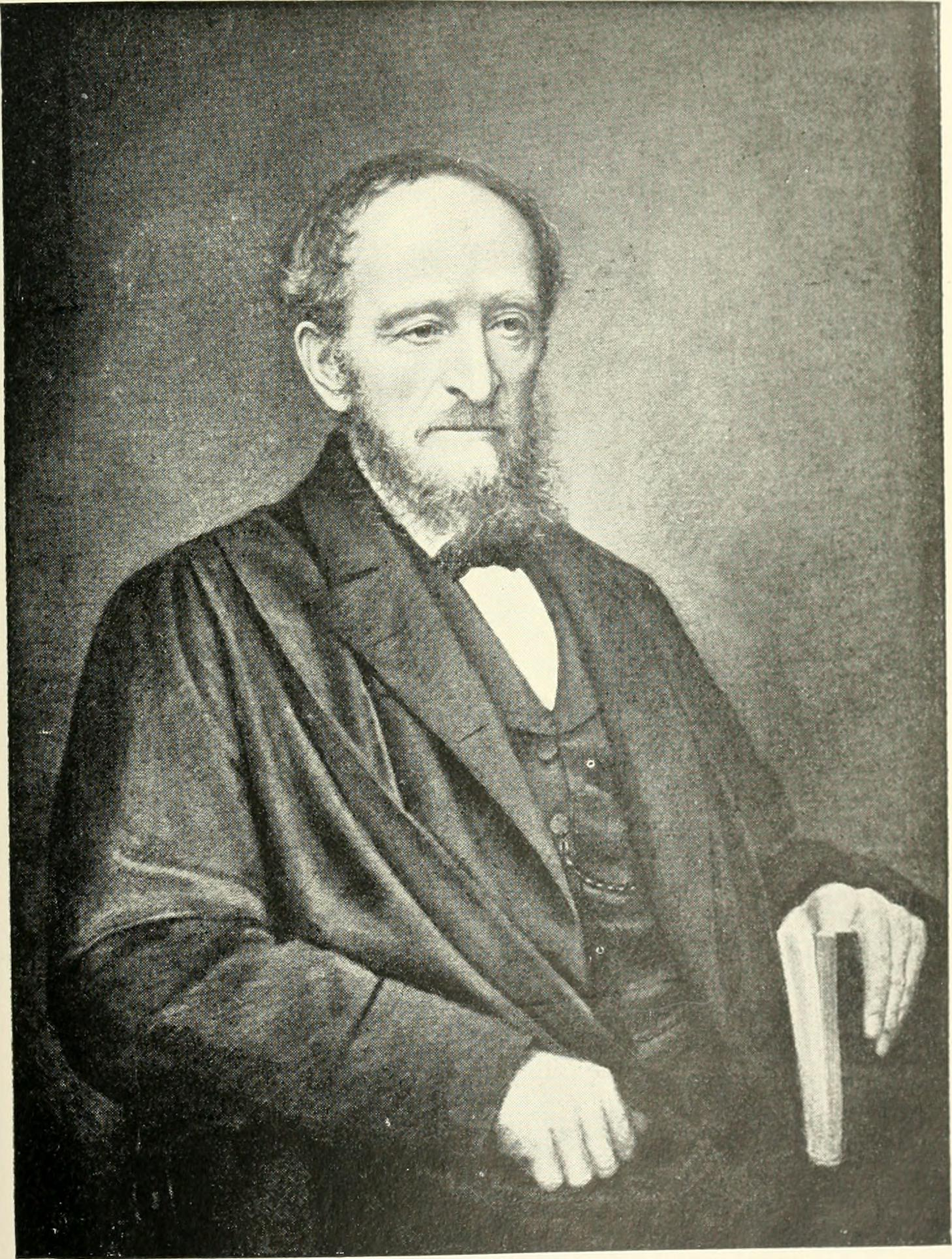
- Mark Pattison
- Born: October 10, 1813; Hauxwell, North Riding of Yorkshire
- Died: July 30, 1884 (aged 70); Harrogate, Yorkshire
- Education: Oriel College, Oxford
- Occupations: Author, Priest
- Predecessor: James Thompson
- Successor: William Walter Merry
- Spouse: Emily Francis Strong (Lady Dilke)

Mark Pattison (10 October 1813 – 30 July 1884) was an English author and a Church of England priest. He served as Rector of Lincoln College, Oxford.

== Life ==
He was the son of the rector of Hauxwell, North Riding of Yorkshire, and was privately educated by his father, Mark James Pattison. His sister was Dorothy Wyndlow Pattison ("Sister Dora"). In 1832, he matriculated at Oriel College, Oxford, where he took his B.A. degree in 1836 with second-class honours. After other attempts to obtain a fellowship, he was elected in 1839 to a Yorkshire fellowship at Lincoln College, Oxford, an anti-Puseyite College. Pattison was at this time a Puseyite, and greatly under the influence of John Henry Newman, for whom he worked, helping in the translation of Thomas Aquinas's Catena Aurea, and writing in the British Critic and Christian Remembrancer.

He was ordained a priest in 1843, and in the same year became tutor of Lincoln College, where he rapidly made a reputation as a clear and stimulating teacher and as a sympathetic friend of youth. The management of the college was practically in his hands, and his reputation as a scholar became high in the university. In 1851 the rectorship of Lincoln became vacant, and it seemed certain that Pattison would be elected, but he was edged out. The disappointment was acute and his health suffered. In 1855, he resigned the tutorship, travelled to Germany to investigate Continental systems of education, and began his researches into the lives of the philologist Isaac Casaubon and the historian Joseph Justus Scaliger, which occupied the remainder of his life.

In 1861, he was at last elected rector of Lincoln College in Oxford, marrying in the same year Emily Francis Strong (afterwards Lady Dilke). As rector, he contributed largely to various reviews on literary subjects, and took a considerable interest in social science, even presiding over a section at a congress in 1876. However, he avoided the routine of university business, and refused the vice-chancellorship. But while living the life of a student, he was fond of society, and especially of the society of women. In later life he formed a close friendship with Meta Bradley, a young woman 40 years his junior. On his death he left her £5,000, much to his wife's displeasure. Pattison died at Harrogate, Yorkshire.

His biography of Isaac Casaubon appeared in 1875; he also wrote about John Milton in Macmillan's "English Men of Letters" series in 1879. The late nineteenth-century English author George Gissing wrote in his diary in 1891 that he "was astonished to find [the biography of Casaubon] on the shelves" of a circulating library in the small north Somerset seaside resort of Clevedon. The 18th century, alike in its literature and its theology, was a favourite study, as is illustrated by his contribution (Tendencies of Religious Thought in England, 1688–1750) to the once famous Essays and Reviews (1860), and by his edition of Pope's Essay on Man (1869), etc. His Sermons and Collected Essays, edited by Henry Nettleship, were published posthumously (1889), as well as the Memoirs (1885), an autobiography deeply tinged with melancholy and bitterness. His projected Life of Scaliger was never finished.

Posterity has not been kind to Mark Pattison. For many he remains the stereotypical Mr DryasDust and/or the original of George Eliot's Edward Casaubon in Middlemarch; and his best-known twentieth-century commentator and critic, John Sparrow, did little to alter that picture. ...

His extensive personal archive—comprising 63 archival boxes and including diaries, correspondence, journals, sermons and working papers, including material relating to Scaliger, Pierre-Daniel Huet and Claude Saumaise—is held in Bodleian Archives & Manuscripts, the Bodleian Library, Oxford (MSS. Pattison 7*, 79–144).

== Publications ==
- (1845). Stephen Langton. Archbishop of Canterbury.
- (1845). St. Edmund. Archbishop of Canterbury.
- (1855). "Oxford Studies." In: Oxford Essays.
- (1859). Report on Elementary Education in Protestant Germany.
- (1860). "Tendencies of Religious Thought in England, 1688–1750." In: Essays and Reviews.
- (1868). Suggestions on Academical Organisation.
- (1875). Isaac Casaubon, 1559–1614.
- (1876). "Review of the Situation." In: Essays on the Endowment of Research.
- (1879). Milton. 1911 reprint of 1879 1st edition
- (1885). Memoirs.
- (1885). Sermons.
- (1889). Essays. (Collected and arranged by Henry Nettleship)
- (1949). The Estiennes.

Selected articles

- (1875). "Milton," Macmillan's Magazine.
- (1876). "Philosophy at Oxford," Mind.
- (1877). "The Age of Reason," The Fortnightly Review.
- (1877). "Books and Critics," The Fortnightly Review.
- (1880). "Middle-class Education," New Quarterly Magazine.
- (1880). "Industrial Shortcomings," The Fortnightly Review.
- (1881). "The Thing That Might Be," The North American Review.
- (1881). "Etienne Dolet," The Fortnightly Review.
- (1882). "What is College?," The Journal of Education.

== Sources ==
- Green, V.H.H. (1985). Love in a Cool Climate: Letters of Mark Pattison and Meta Bradley. Oxford University Press.
- Jones, H.S. (2007). Intellect and Character in Victorian England: Mark Pattison and the Invention of the Don. Cambridge: Cambridge University Press.
- Sparrow, John (1967). Mark Pattison and the Idea of a University. Cambridge: Cambridge University Press.

Academic offices
Preceded by James Thompson	Rector of Lincoln College, Oxford; 1861–1884	Succeeded by William Walter Merry
