= John W. Frederick Jr. =

American soldier

- Born: December 13, 1923; Manito, Illinois, U.S
- Died: July 19, 1972 (aged 48); Hanoi, North Vietnam
- Military career
- Allegiance: United States
- Branch: United States Marine Corps
- Service years: 1942–1972
- Rank: Chief Warrant Officer
- Conflicts: World War II; Korean War; Vietnam War
- Awards: Navy Cross; Silver Star; Legion of Merit (2); Distinguished Flying Cross; Bronze Star Medal

John W. Frederick Jr. (December 13, 1923 – on or about July 19, 1972) was a United States Marine Corps chief warrant officer and veteran of three wars who died in captivity as a prisoner of war during the Vietnam War.

== Early life ==
John Frederick was born on December 13, 1923, in Manito, Illinois.

== Military career ==
=== World War II to Korea ===
Frederick enlisted in the United States Marine Corps on May 7, 1942, and was trained as a tail gunner on carrier-based bomber aircraft. He flew 40 combat missions as a tail gunner and radar operator on Grumman TBF Avenger torpedo bombers. Frederick served in the Pacific Theater for the duration of the war.

Following World War II, Frederick served with a contingent of U.S. Marines in China known as "China Marines", sent to occupy northern China from 1945 to 1948 prior to the fall of Chiang Kai-shek in the Chinese Civil War. During the Korean War, Frederick flew in combat as a radar operator in the backseat of a Grumman F7F Tigercat.

=== Vietnam War ===
Chief Warrant Officer 4 Frederick (called "Freddie" by his POW contemporaries) was shot down over North Vietnam on December 7, 1965, while serving as a radar intercept officer in an F-4 fighter aircraft. The pilot of the aircraft, Major John H. Dunn, was also captured. Frederick's hands and forearms were badly burned before ejecting, and after capture without proper medical attention his fingers grew together in the healing process.

For his conduct as a prisoner of war, Frederick received the Navy Cross, the United States Naval Service's second-highest decoration for extraordinary heroism. Additional awards included the Silver Star, two awards of the Legion of Merit, and the Distinguished Flying Cross.

== Death and legacy ==
While in captivity in 1972, Frederick contracted an unknown illness, believed to have been typhoid fever, and fell into a coma. With a high fever, camp guards removed him for medical treatment, and he is believed to have died shortly after reaching a hospital in Hanoi. Frederick's remains were repatriated on March 13, 1974.

During a 1999 service commemorating the U.S. Marine Corps birthday at the Washington National Cathedral, Frederick was eulogized by fellow POW, General Charles G. Boyd. Cellmates at the Sơn Tây prison camp, which was later the scene of an attempted rescue of American prisoners in 1970 by U.S. special forces during Operation Ivory Coast, Boyd remembered Frederick thusly: "John was a taciturn man, deeply religious, respectful of other people’s sensitivities, a valued cellmate... He did not go out of his way to provoke his captors but was a fierce resister when they tried to get anything from him. For me John Frederick was a symbol of quiet stoicism, an utterly dependable comrade-in-arms who would be there when you needed him, no matter the risk.”

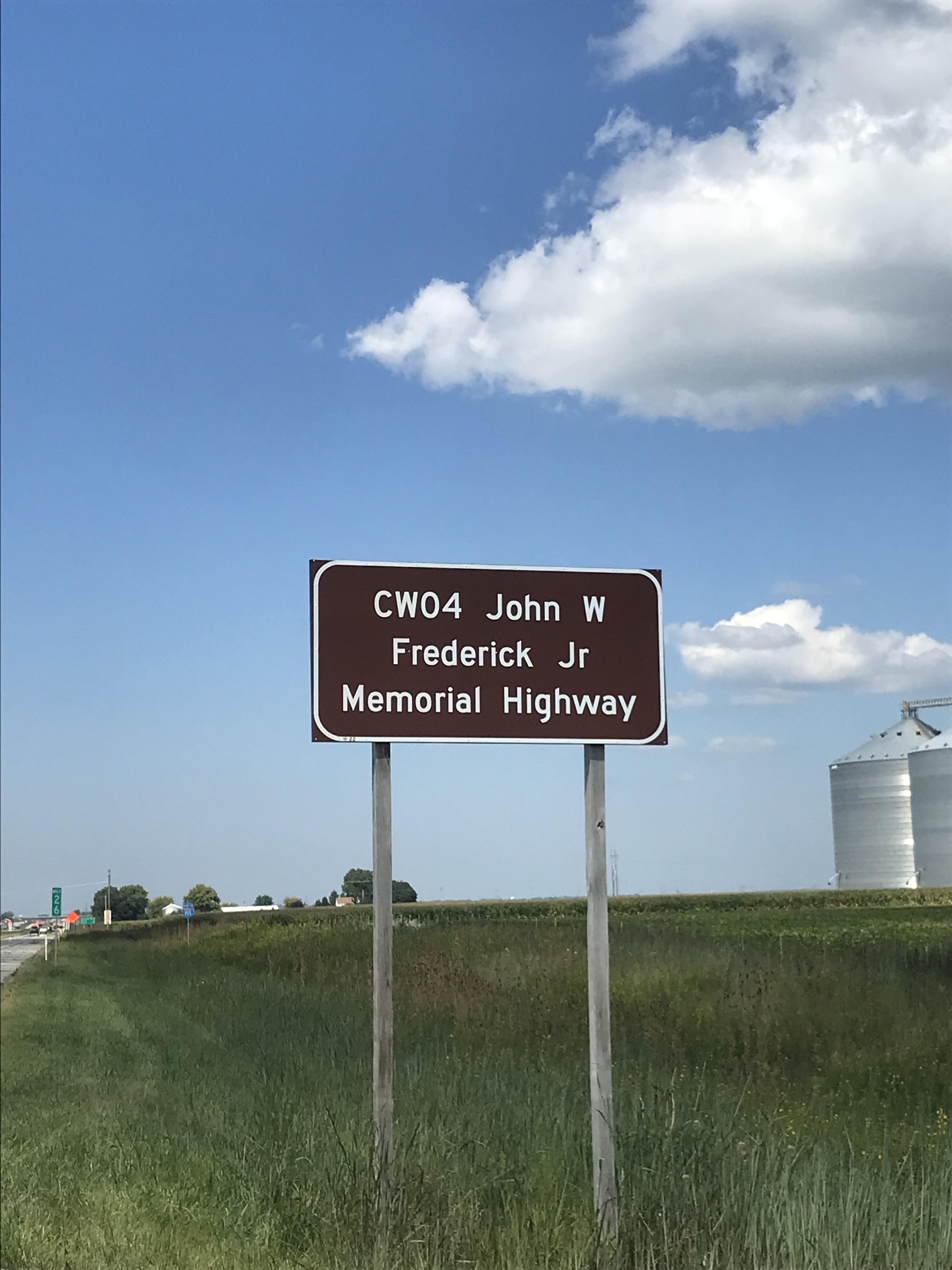
CWO John W. Frederick Jr. Memorial Highway, Interstate 155, Illinois, USA

In 1999, a study lounge in O'Bannon Hall at The Basic School on Marine Corps Base Quantico was dedicated to Frederick. In 2022, the Illinois General Assembly designated Interstate I-155 from Interstate 74 to IL Route 9 near Morton and Tremont as the “CWO4 John W. Frederick Jr. Memorial Highway.”

== Navy Cross citation ==
Frederick, John William
Chief Warrant Officer, U.S. Marine Corps
Date of Action: June 1967 to August 1968

The President of the United States of America takes pride in presenting the Navy Cross (Posthumously) to Chief Warrant Officer John William Frederick, Jr. (MCSN: WO-82847/397561), United States Marine Corps, for extraordinary heroism while interned as a Prisoner of War in Southeast Asia from June 1967 to August 1968. During this period, Chief Warrant Officer Frederick distinguished himself by his relentless rejection of any attempts to gain his cooperation or assistance. His steadfast resistance in the face of grave personal danger was an inspiration to other Prisoners of War who observed him. As a result of his dogged resistance, in spite of the fury and relentless cruelty of his captors, fellow prisoners were able to emulate his highly professional example and to find additional personal strength by which to resist interrogation and indoctrination. As a hard-core resister, and with full knowledge of the serious personal hazards to his life, Chief Warrant Officer Frederick personified leadership, bravery, and resistance far beyond that which could reasonably be expected. By his loyalty, perseverance, and courageous actions, Chief Warrant Officer Frederick upheld the highest traditions of the United States Marine Corps and the United States Naval Service.
