= Tom Cipullo =

American composer

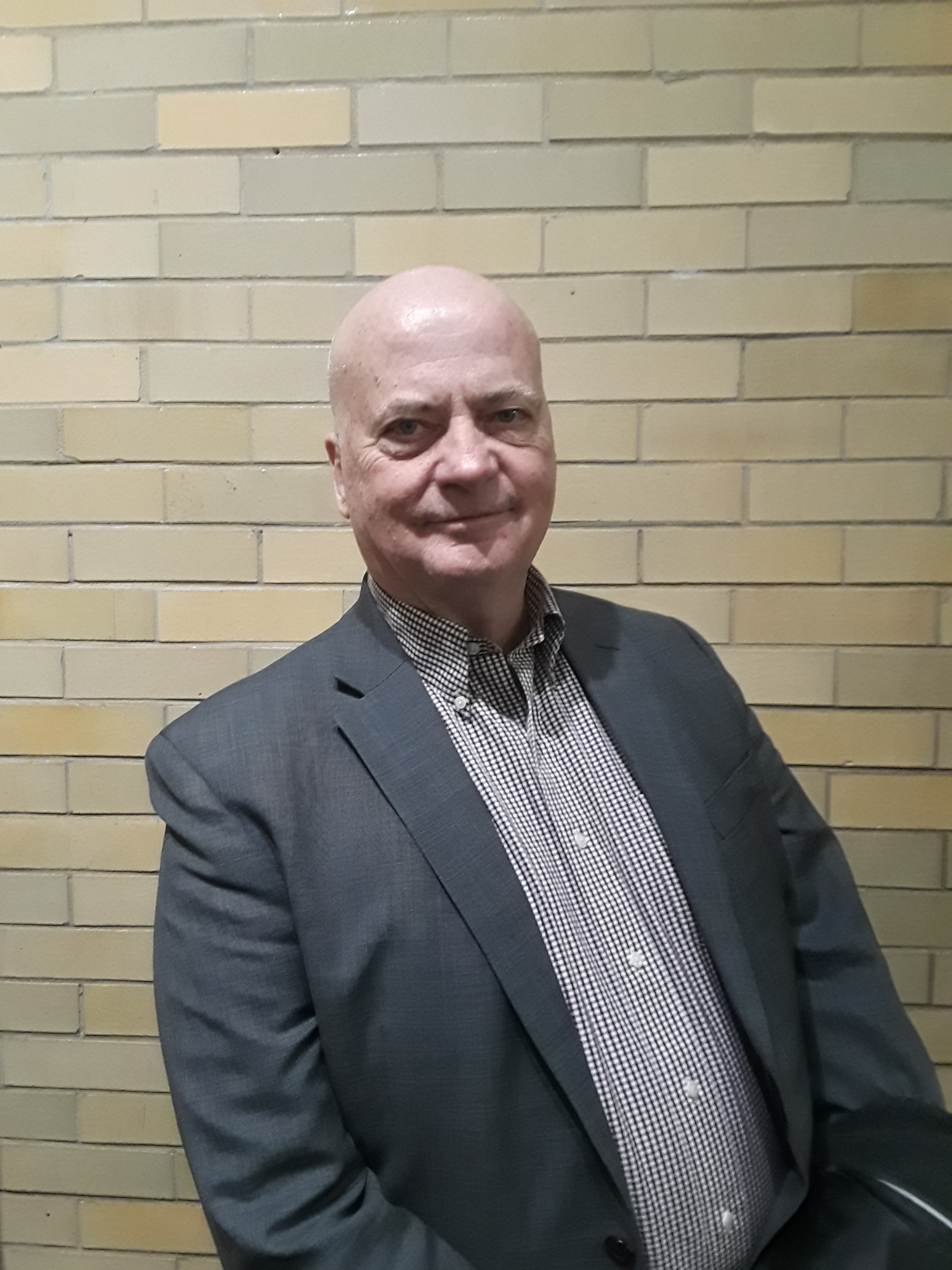
- Cipullo in January 2024
- Born: November 22, 1956 (age 69); Long Island, New York, U.S.
- Occupation: Composer
- Notable work: Glory Denied
- Musical career
- Labels: Albany; CRI; PGM; MSR Classics; GPR; Centaur; Capstone

Tom Cipullo (born November 22, 1956) is an American composer. Known mostly for vocal music, he has also composed orchestral, chamber, and solo instrumental works. His opera, Glory Denied, has been performed to critical acclaim in New York, Washington, and Texas.

== Early life ==
Tom Cipullo was born into a musical family on Long Island, New York. His father, a jazz bassist performing under the name Ray Carle, worked throughout the New York area and hosted a successful radio show in the late 1950s and early 1960s, broadcasting with a quartet from the Café Rouge of the Statler Hilton Hotel. Cipullo's brother, Chris, was a drummer in Los Angeles. Cipullo's father named him after the bandleader Tommy Dorsey. Dorsey, who appeared frequently at the Café Rouge, died just a few days after Cipullo's birth.

Cipullo attended Hofstra University, Boston University, and the Graduate Center of the City University of New York. His teachers included David Del Tredici, Elie Siegmeister, Albert Tepper, Thea Musgrave (orchestration), and Graham Forbes, a highly regarded jazz pianist and the accompanist for Frank Sinatra during a period in the 1950s.

== Professional career ==
Cipullo's song cycles may be said to have entered the standard repertoire. He has composed over 225 songs, one evening-length chamber opera, six works for voices and chamber ensemble, solo piano pieces, and works for chorus and orchestra. Several of his song cycles are published by Oxford University Press, and others are distributed by Classical Vocal Reprints. His music appears on over a dozen commercially-released compact discs on the Albany, CRI, PGM, MSR Classics, GPR, Centaur, and Capstone labels.

== Musical style and critical reception ==
Cipullo is a composer of tonal music, although his use of harmony may occasionally stretch to include bitonality and extremely dissonant passages. His vocal music is lyrical in the extreme, but marked by large leaps, lengthy phrases with surprising breaths, numerous shifts in meter, virtuosic piano accompaniments, and a love of musical allusion. Writing for The New York Times, Allan Kozinn said, "Mr. Cipullo's vocal writing is fresh and natural, and he amplifies it with thoughtful, sometimes picturesque commentary in the piano line." Cipullo's compositions are text-driven, and Fanfare magazine noted that "he excels by pulling off the conjuror's trick mastered by all the great writers of poem-based song from Schubert forward—the blurring of the demarcation between where the word ends and the music begins." In presenting him with its Arts & Letters Award, the American Academy of Arts and Letters cited Cipullo's music for its "inexhaustible imagination, wit, expressive range and originality."

== Personal ==
Cipullo is married to the Belgian artist Hedwig Brouckaert. They have one daughter, Lois.

== Awards ==
- 2016–18 Chamber Opera Competition from the National Opera Association for the opera After Life (libretto by David Mason) (2017)
- 2018 Domenic J. Pellicciotti Opera Composition Prize for his work Mayo (awarded in 2016, opera premiered at the Crane School of Music in 2018)
- Arts & Letters Award from the American Academy of Arts & Letters (2013)
- Sylvia Goldstein Award from Copland House (2013)
- Guggenheim Fellowship (2012)
- Aaron Copland Bogliasco Fellowship from the Liguria Study Center (Italy) (2010)
- Fundación Valparaiso Residency (Spain) (2010)
- Minnesota New Orchestral Repertoire Award for Sparkler (2009)
- National Association of Teachers of Singing (NATS) Art Song Award for the song-cycle Of a Certain Age (2008)
- Aaron Copland Award from Copland House (2007)
- Phyllis Wattis Award for American Song from the San Francisco Song Festival for the song-cycle Drifts and Shadows (2006–07)

== Notable works ==
- Glory Denied (2007; rev 2010 and 2013) opera in two acts
- Emily’s Truth (2012) for soprano, baritone, and piano
- Sleeping Flowers (2012) for baritone and guitar
- G is for Grimy: An Ode to New York’s G train (2011) for vocal quartet and piano
- A Letter from Chicago (2011) for soprano, tenor, baritone, and piano
- Excelsior (2011) for baritone voice and piano
- Something About Autumn (2010) for soprano, violin, clarinet, and piano
- Passionate Sacrament (2010) for violin and piano
- Lucy (2009) mini-opera in one scene libretto by the composer
- Insomnia (2009) cantata for vocal quartet and piano
- America 1968 (2008) for baritone voice and piano
- Meditation No. 2 (2008) for piano
- I Hear America Singing (2008) for baritone and piano
- Of a Certain Age(2007) for soprano and piano
- Meditation No. 1 (2006) for piano
- Drifts and Shadows(2005) for baritone and piano
- A White Rose (2003) for mezzo-soprano and piano
- Going (2003) for soprano and piano
- glances (2002) for mezzo-soprano and piano
- Secrets (2002) cantata for vocal trio and piano
- Late Summer (2001) for high voice and piano
- Climbing: 7 Songs on 8 Poems by African-Americans (2000) for voice and piano
- How to Get Heat Without Fire (2000) for soprano and piano
- Voices of the Young (1999) for SATB chorus and orchestra
- Another Reason Why I Don’t Keep a Gun in the House (1998) for voice and piano
- A Visit with Emily (1998, rev. 2001) cantata for soprano, two baritones, and piano
- Landscape with Figures (1997) for boy soprano, bass-baritone, violin, and piano
- The Shadows Around the House (1996) for SATB chorus, string quartet, and percussion
- Water Lilies (1995) for solo piano
- The Ecuadorian Sailors (1994) for mezzo-soprano, flute, viola, and harp
- The Land of Nod (1993) for tenor (or soprano) and piano
- The Husbands (1993) for soprano, high baritone, flute, viola, and piano
- Sparkler (1993) for orchestra
- Rain (1992) for tenor, flute, violin, viola, cello, percussion, harp, and piano
- Long Island Songs (1992) for tenor (or soprano) and piano

== Glory Denied ==
Cipullo’s chamber opera Glory Denied has met with considerable success and garnered critical acclaim. The opera, based on the oral history by journalist Tom Philpott, tells the true story of Colonel Jim Thompson, an American soldier held as a prisoner of war in Vietnam from 1964 to 1973. The story deals not only with Thompson’s suffering in the jungles of southeast Asia, but also chronicles the personal struggles that followed his liberation and repatriation. In short, Glory Denied is the story of an American family during one of the nation’s most turbulent eras. Richard Bernstein, in reviewing Philpott’s book for The New York Times, stated, “Indeed it is not too much to say that Glory Denied... encapsulate[s] something of the moral essence of the Vietnam War and the imperishable bitterness of its legacy.” Some of the opera's success is no doubt due to the resonance audiences have found with the subject matter. As Allan Kozinn of The New York Times neatly summed up, “How is this for a story with operatic potential? A prisoner of war held for nearly a decade returns home to find that his wife has moved on, his nation has changed beyond recognition, and he is unable to find his bearings in the society he fought to defend. It is Monteverdi’s "Ritorno d’Ulisse in Patria" in reverse: the story of the returning warrior, but in this thoroughly modern version, everything has gone wrong, and redemption is out of reach.” Glory Denied is written for a cast of four (two sopranos, a tenor, and a baritone) and the score exists in three different orchestrations, from nine players to full orchestra. The work was recorded live by Fort Worth Opera and released on Albany Records in August 2013 (Troy 1433). Critical reaction to the opera has been overwhelmingly enthusiastic. The following examples are typical:

- "tense, nervous and gripping theater…intimate in its presentation (minimal sets and costumes and a nine-musician ensemble) and epic in its scope and effect…From hope to despair, from love to hatred to forgiveness, the dramatic tension was relentless." - Opera News
- "…a powerful drama of great music and acting intensity."
- - Fort Worth Star-Telegram
- "…a powerfully realistic thriller and an unabashedly honest commentary on the America of the 1960s and ’70s." - Fort Worth Weekly
- "[an] intimate operatic masterpiece."- D Magazine
- "Mr. Cipullo’s vocal writing is angular and declamatory at times, but he has a keen sense of when to let that modernist approach melt into glowing melody, and he has an even keener ear for orchestral color."- The New York Times
- "…a luminous score that offered vivid embodiments of the protagonist's mental states." - Washington Post
- "Dramatic is an understatement. In its operatic form, it is horrifying, riveting, involving, shocking, inspiring, overwhelming, appalling and devastating—in that order." - Theater Jones
- "…a work of our time…It holds its own against the greatest of the classical repertoire, while helping to redefine it at the rarer scale of chamber opera." - DC Arts Beat

== The Parting ==
An opera by Cipullo to a libretto by David Mason based on the life and poems of Miklós Radnóti.

== Bibliography ==
- Bell, Elizabeth. The Art Songs of Tom Cipullo. Ph.D. dissertation (November 2010), City University of New York.
- Blier, Steven. Program Notes for Brava Italia!, September 15 and 16, 2006 at Weill Recital Hall.
- Cantrell, Scott. "Opera: Tom Cipullo's Vietnam War piece comes to Fort Worth." Dallas Morning News, April 20, 2013.
- Carman, Judith. "Chamber Music: Solo Voice with instruments: Cipullo, Tom: The Husbands." Review in Journal of Singing 64 (2008): pages 381-82.
- _____. "Cipullo, Tom: Drifts and Shadows." Review in Journal of Singing 63 (2007): pages 604-606.
- _____. "Circularly Yours: Mostly Song Cycles: Cipullo, Tom: Glances." Review in Journal of Singing 60 (2004): page 415.
- _____. "New Settings of Poems by Emily Dickinson and Two New Spanish Song Collections: Cipullo, Tom: Late Summer and A Visit with Emily." Review in Journal of Singing 60 (2004): pages 311-313.
- Clair, Renee. Glances: An Analysis of the Song Cycle by Tom Cipullo. DMA dissertation (December 2011), University of Memphis.
- Clifton, Keith. "'Dreams of Pure Spirit': The Songs of Tom Cipullo." National Association of Teachers of Singing Poster Presentation, presented at the NATS conference, Minneapolis, July 1, 2006.
- Clifton, Keith. Recent American Art Song: A Guide. Lanham, Maryland: Scarecrow Press, 2008: pages 33–36.
- Cohen, Barry. "The Joy of Cipullo's Emily." The New Music Connoisseur 12, no.4 (2004): page 11.
- Cohen, Douglas. "The Making of an American Opera: A Conversation with Tom Cipullo." Institute for Studies in American Music Newsletter 36, no.2 (2007): pages 6–7, 13–14.
- Greenfield, Philip. "Echoes and Shadows." Review of The Shadows Around the House in American Record Guide, January/February 1998: page 230.
- Hudson, Hope. A Study of the Patterns of Collaboration between the 21st Century Art Song Composer and Singer: "Chapter 2, Tom Cipullo and Of a Certain Age." Ed.D. dissertation (in progress), Teachers College, Columbia University: New York.
- Hurwitt, Elliott. "Orchestral Miniatures." Review of Sparkler in Fanfare May/June 1997: 345-46.
- Kelly, Christopher. "Fort Worth Opera challenges audiences." Fort Worth Star-Telegram, April 20, 2013.
- Kozinn, Allan. "A Soldier's Torment in Vietnam and at Home." Review of Glory Denied in The New York Times, November 12, 2010.
- _____. "Song of the Poets, in Chamber Settings." Review in The New York Times. May 26, 2011.
- Midgette, Anne. "A Former P.O.W, Now Sentenced to Loneliness." Review of Glory Denied in The New York Times, May 7, 2007.
- _____. "Scrutinizing Four American Sources with a Distinctive Eye." Review of glances in The New York Times, April 23, 2005.
- Moon, H. Paul. "Urban Arias: 'Glory Denied'." Review of Glory Denied in the DC Arts Beat (http://www.dcartsbeat.com/2011/04/urban-arias-glory-denied.html) April 4, 2011
- Reinthaler, Joan. "Vietnam-era saga 'Glory Denied' Doesn't Withhold a Single Musical Wish." Review of Glory Denied in The Washington Post. April 3, 2011.
- Smith, Ken. "New York Festival of Song : Michael Barrett and Steven Blier, conducting." Review of The Husbands in Chorus! 5, no.7 (1993).
- Snydacker, Sarah Elizabeth. The New American Song: A Catalog of Published Songs by 25 American Composers. Ph.D. dissertation (December 2011), University of Iowa.
- Tommasini, Anthony. "If Operas Can Make It Here." Review of Glory Denied in The New York Times, June 6, 2004.
- Zink, Joshua. Love’s Austere and Lonely Offices: An Analysis of Tom Cipullo’s America 1968. D.M.A. dissertation (May 2015), University of Nebraska-Lincoln.
