= Stuart Rochester =

American military historian (1945 – 2009)

External videos
- Booknotes interview with Rochester on Honor Bound, October 10, 1999, C-SPAN
- Interview with Rochester and Kiley on Honor Bound, December 5, 1999, C-SPAN

Stuart I. Rochester (November 24, 1945 – July 29, 2009) was the chief historian for the United States Office of the Secretary of Defense and author and co-author of several books, including a notable account on American prisoners of war in Southeast Asia. Rochester was also an authority on the comparative national defense policies of post-World War II presidential administrations.

== Career ==
Born in Baltimore, Maryland on November 24, 1945, Stuart Rochester received an undergraduate degree from Loyola College in Maryland and master's and doctorate degrees in history from the University of Virginia. He was named to Phi Beta Kappa society.

Dr. Rochester taught at Loyola College in the 1970s before going to work at the Pentagon's office of history within the Department of Defense. Dr. Rochester became deputy historian of the Office of the Secretary of Defense in 1987 and chief historian in 2008.

Dr. Rochester's book, Honor Bound: American Prisoners of War in Southeast Asia, 1961-1973, which he co-wrote with Frederick T. Kiley, was considered the definitive account of U.S. Prisoners of War during the Vietnam War. James Stockdale called the book, "A monumental achievement, not only in its depth and breadth of treatment but in its honesty and accuracy." Eugene V. Rostow called the book, "a masterpiece."

Rochester died of melanoma at his home in Burtonsville, Maryland on July 29, 2009, aged 63.

== Bibliography ==
- (with Frederick T. Kiley) Honor Bound: American Prisoners of War in Southeast Asia, 1961-1973, Naval Institute Press, 1998.
- American Liberal Disillusionment: In the Wake of World War I, Pennsylvania State University Press, 1977.
- Rochester, Stuart I. (1976). Takeoff at mid-century : Federal civil aviation policy in the Eisenhower years, 1953-1961. Washington, D.C.: U.S. Department of Transportation. free public-domain eBook via HathiTrust
