= Fred V. Cherry =

US Air Force officer and POW (1928–2016)

Fred Vann Cherry
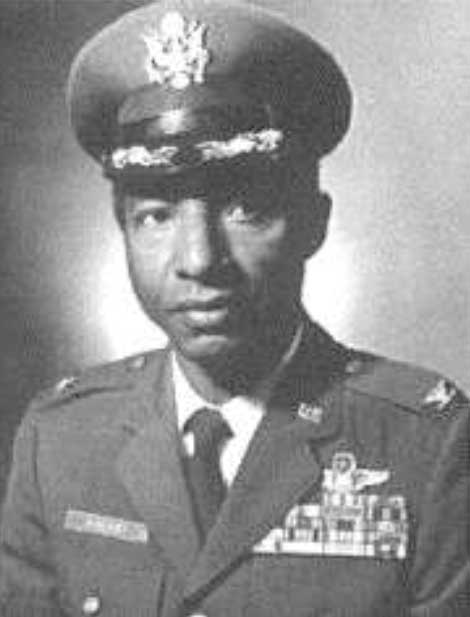
- Born: March 24, 1928; Suffolk, Virginia, U.S.
- Died: February 16, 2016 (aged 87); Washington D.C., U.S.
- Burial place: Arlington National Cemetery
- Military career
- Allegiance: United States
- Branch: United States Air Force
- Service years: 1952–1981
- Rank: Colonel
- Units: 58th Fighter-Bomber Wing; 35th Tactical Fighter Squadron
- Conflicts: Korean War; Vietnam War (POW)
- Awards: Air Force Cross; Silver Star; Legion of Merit (2); Distinguished Flying Cross (2); Bronze Star Medal (2); Purple Heart (2); Meritorious Service Medal; Air Medal (3)

Fred Vann Cherry (March 24, 1928 – February 16, 2016) was a colonel and command pilot in the U.S. Air Force. A career fighter pilot, he served in the Korean War and the Vietnam War.

== Background ==
Cherry was born March 24, 1928, in Suffolk, Virginia, into a poor farming family. He attended racially segregated public schools there. In 1951, Cherry graduated from Virginia Union University in Richmond, Virginia.

== Military career ==
On June 29, 1951, after his college graduation, Cherry enlisted in the Aviation Cadet Training Program of the U.S. Air Force, and was commissioned a second lieutenant. He was awarded his pilot wings at Webb Air Force Base in Texas on October 25, 1952.

=== Korean War ===
Cherry was soon serving in the Korean War, where he flew F-84 Thunderjets on more than 100 combat missions, with the 58th Fighter-Bomber Wing, which was stationed at Taegu Air Base in South Korea

=== Vietnam War ===
During a combat mission on October 22, 1965, Cherry's F-105 Thunderchief fighter-bomber was shot down over North Vietnam. Cherry ejected and landed with a broken ankle and wrist, and a crushed shoulder. He was immediately captured by North Vietnamese militia.

Cherry was the first and highest ranking Black officer among American prisoners of war during the Vietnam War. According to Cherry, his North Vietnamese captors wanted him to make public statements about racial intolerance in the United States, but he refused. As a result, Cherry spent 702 days in solitary confinement and was tortured for 93 days in a row. Cherry's jailers placed U.S. Navy pilot Ensign Porter Halyburton, a Southern white man, in Cherry's cell in the hopes that the two men would become antagonists. Instead, the two pilots helped each other to survive confinement and became close friends. After seven years as a prisoner of war, Cherry was released from captivity on February 12, 1973. Cherry told the story of his POW experience to Wallace Terry.

=== Later career in Air force ===
After returning home, Cherry discovered that his wife, Shirley Brown, had taken all of his life savings after the Air Force declared him missing in action and started dating another man. Cherry started legal proceedings with the Air Force to have back salary and other payments returned to him.

After Vietnam, Cherry attended the National War College and was assigned to the Defense Intelligence Agency. He retired from the Air Force with over 30 years of service on 1 September 1981.

== Later life ==
In 1982, the United States Court of Claims found the Air Force negligent in handling Cherry's military pay and awarded him $38,449 in compensation. At the time of the award, Cherry stated that he would contest the decision, saying that he wanted more of the $129,000 that his wife had received from the Air Force.

Following his retirement from active duty, President Ronald Reagan commissioned Cherry to serve on the Korean War Veterans Memorial Advisory Board.

Cherry also was Director of Technical Support Services for E.H. White & Co. and as Marketing Manager for Data Transformation Corp. Cherry later was Chief Executive Officer for Cherry Engineering and Support Services, and as Director of SilverStar Consulting.

== Death ==
Cherry died of cardiac disease on February 16, 2016, at a hospital in Washington, D.C. He was buried with full military honors at Arlington National Cemetery.

== Legacy ==
A school named after Cherry, Colonel Fred Cherry Middle School in Suffolk, Virginia, was opened in 2018.

== In media ==
Books

Cherry's life is the subject of the book, Two Souls Indivisible: The Friendship That Saved Two POWs in Vietnam, by James S. Hirsch, author of Hurricane.

A chapter of Bloods: An Oral History of the Vietnam War (1984) by Wallace Terry is devoted to Cherry's experience in Vietnam and afterward.

Films

Cherry was featured in the documentary, Tom Hanks Presents: Return With Honor, the story of Vietnam fighter pilots held as prisoners of war.

== Awards and decorations ==
Colonel Cherry's awards and decorations include the Air Force Cross, the Silver Star, the Legion of Merit with Oak Leaf Cluster, two Distinguished Flying Crosses, two Bronze Stars with Combat V, two Purple Hearts, the Meritorious Service Medal, three Air Medals, the Air Force Commendation Medal, the Prisoner of War Medal, and two Presidential Unit Citations. Cherry also received the Award for Outstanding Service to the Military Community from the Tuskegee Airmen.

USAF Command Pilot Badge
Air Force Cross	Silver Star	Legion of Merit w/ 1 bronze oak leaf cluster
Distinguished Flying Cross w/ 1 bronze oak leaf cluster	Bronze Star w/ Valor device and 1 bronze oak leaf cluster	Purple Heart w/ 1 bronze oak leaf cluster
Meritorious Service Medal	Air Medal w/ 2 bronze oak leaf clusters	Air Force Commendation Medal
Air Force Presidential Unit Citation w/ 1 bronze oak leaf cluster	Air Force Outstanding Unit Award	Prisoner of War Medal
Combat Readiness Medal	Army Good Conduct Medal	National Defense Service Medal w/ 1 service star
Korean Service Medal w/ 3 bronze campaign stars	Armed Forces Expeditionary Medal	Vietnam Service Medal w/ 3 silver and 1 bronze campaign stars
Air Force Longevity Service Award w/ 1 silver and 1 bronze oak leaf clusters	Republic of Korea Presidential Unit Citation	Republic of Vietnam Gallantry Cross Unit Citation w/ Palm and Frame
United Nations Korea Medal	Vietnam Campaign Medal	Republic of Korea War Service Medal

=== Air Force Cross citation ===
Colonel Fred Vann Cherry
U.S. Air Force
Prisoner of War (North Vietnam)
Date of Action: August 15 - November 15, 1967

The President of the United States of America, authorized by Title 10, Section 8742, United States Code, takes pleasure in presenting the Air Force Cross to Colonel Fred Vann Cherry, United States Air Force, for extraordinary heroism in military operations against an opposing armed force as a Prisoner of War in North Vietnam from 15 August 1967 to 15 November 1967. During this period, Colonel Cherry demonstrated his extremely strong personal fortitude and maximum persistence in the face of severe enemy harassment and torture, suffering critical injuries and wounds. Through his extraordinary heroism and willpower, in the face of the enemy, Colonel Cherry reflected the highest credit upon himself and the United States Air Force.
