= James Thomson (cricketer) =

New Zealand cricketer

Personal information
- Full name: James Campbell Thomson
- Born: 20 February 1852; Edinburgh, Scotland
- Died: 2 May 1890 (aged 38); Waratah, New South Wales, Australia

Domestic team information
- Years: Team
- 1873/74: Otago
- Source: CricInfo, 26 May 2016

James Campbell Thomson (20 February 1852 – 2 May 1890) was a New Zealand cricketer. He played two first-class matches for Otago during the 1873–74 season.

Thomson was born at Edinburgh in Scotland in 1852. He became a member of Dunedin cricket club in Otago in 1871, later serving on the club's committee in 1873.

Both of Thomson's first-class matches were played during the 1873–74 season. On debut against Auckland in November 1873 he scored 10 runs in each innings at the South Dunedin Recreation Ground. His second match, and Otago's only other first-class match of the season, saw him score only one run in the only innings in which be batted as Otago won by an innings against Canterbury in January 1874.

Thomson died in 1890 at Waratah in New South Wales. He was aged 38.
