= James H. Thompson =

James Harry Thompson (1824 - November 4, 1896) was an American soldier and surgeon and recipient of the Medal of Honor during the American Civil War.

Thompson was born in England in 1824 and joined the Union Army and served during the American Civil War. He was awarded the medal for actions with the U.S Volunteers on 14 March 1862 at New Bern, North Carolina. He became a major.

He died in Great Yarmouth, England on November 4, 1896.

== Medal of Honor Citation ==
Voluntarily reconnoitered the enemy's position and carried orders under the hottest fire.

Date Issued: 11 November 1870
