= Jimmy Thompson (executioner) =

American executioner

- Born: James H. Thompson; January 9, 1896; Mississippi, U.S.
- Died: October 12, 1952 (aged 56); Mississippi, U.S.
- Occupation: Executioner

James "Jimmy" H. Thompson (January 9, 1896 – 12 October 1952) was executioner for the state of Mississippi executioner from 1940 to 1950, responsible for about 55 executions.

Thompson traveled around the state to perform executions, operating the only portable electrical chair in the world. In the days following executions he was often found intoxicated, and faced arrests for drunk and disorderly conduct.

He had previously worked in carnivals and had many tattoos of snakes, strawberries, black cats, and other items. He used a portable electric chair and was paid $100 per execution.

His life became the inspiration for the 1970 film Traveling Executioner starring Stacy Keach.
