= Doug Hegdahl =

United States Navy sailor

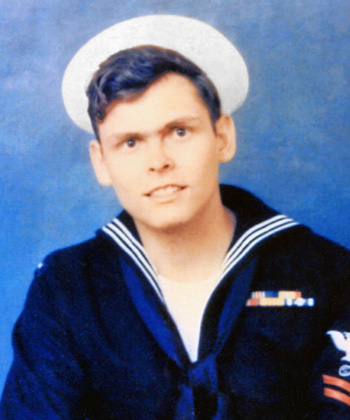
- Hegdahl in 1970
- Born: Douglas Brent Hegdahl III; September 3, 1946 (age 80); Clark, South Dakota, U.S.
- Military career
- Allegiance: United States
- Branch: United States Navy
- Service years: 1966–1970
- Rank: Petty officer second class
- Conflicts: Vietnam War (POW)
- Other work: SERE instructor

Douglas Brent Hegdahl (born September 3, 1946) is a former United States Navy petty officer second class (E-5) who was held as a prisoner of war during the Vietnam War. After an early release, he was able to provide the names and personal information of about 256 fellow POWs, as well as reveal the conditions of the prisoner-of-war camp.

== Early life and military career ==
Hegdahl was born on September 3, 1946. Both of his parents were descended from Norwegian immigrants and he remarked how his entire family were devout Lutherans. Hegdahl graduated from Clark High School in Clark, South Dakota on May 24, 1966. Immediately afterwards, he enlisted in the United States Navy. Following recruit training and advanced school, he had achieved the rank of Seaman Apprentice and was sent to Dixie Station.

Sometime in the early morning hours of April 6, 1967, 20-year-old Hegdahl was onboard the USS Canberra in the Gulf of Tonkin, three miles off the coast, when he was knocked overboard by the blast from a 5-inch gun mount. He swam and tread water until he was picked up several hours later by Vietnamese fishermen who treated him well. He was reported missing at the 11:30 a.m. ship's muster. After two searches of the ship, he was officially listed as "missing as a result of lost at sea." Later that day, Hegdahl was handed over to Vietnamese militiamen who clubbed him with their rifles before moving him to the infamous "Hanoi Hilton" prison.

The interrogators first believed that Hegdahl was a commando or an agent. His story of being blown overboard seemed unbelievable to the interrogators. Hegdahl thought he would be much better off if he pretended to be of low intelligence. Hegdahl was physically maltreated for a few days before he was able to convince his captors that he was of little value for their propaganda campaign. His bumpkin demeanor and youthful appearance aided in his ability to convince them that he was no threat to them.

When asked to write statements against the United States, he agreed, but pretended to be unable to read or write, which was believable to his Vietnamese captors. Thinking they had someone who would be easily turned to their cause, they assigned someone to teach Hegdahl to read. After Hegdahl appeared to be incapable of learning to read and write, his captors gave up on him. Later, he came to be known to the Vietnamese as "The Incredibly Stupid One", and he was given nearly free run of the camp.

He reported that fellow U.S. captives in the Vietnam War would authenticate a new prisoner's U.S. identity by using "Shave and a Haircut" as a shibboleth, tapping the first five notes against a cell wall and waiting for the appropriate response. U.S. POWs were then able to communicate securely with one another via a tap code. Then, with the help of Joseph Crecca, a U.S. Air Force officer and fellow prisoner, Hegdahl memorized names, capture dates, method of capture, and personal information of about 256 other prisoners. Among other methods, he used the children's song Old MacDonald Had a Farm, repeated constantly, to retain the data. According to his senior officer and cellmate, Lieutenant Commander Richard A. Stratton, Hegdahl also convinced his captors that he needed new glasses and memorized the route from the prison into the city of Hanoi, where he was taken to be fitted.

During his prison stay, Hegdahl disabled five trucks by putting dirt in their fuel tanks.

Hegdahl was one of three POWs (along with Navy Lieutenant Robert Frishman and Air Force Captain Wesley Rumble) who were released on August 5, 1969, as a propaganda move by the North Vietnamese. Although the POWs had agreed that none would accept early release, they agreed that Hegdahl's release should be an exception. He was ordered to accept an early release so that he could provide the names of POWs being held by the North Vietnamese and reveal the conditions to which the prisoners were being subjected.

After his discharge, Hegdahl was sent to the Paris Peace Talks by Ross Perot in December 1970 and confronted the North Vietnamese with his first-hand information about the mistreatment of prisoners.

== Post-war life and wider recognition ==
After returning to the United States, Hegdahl used his experiences as an instructor at the U.S. Navy's Survival, Evasion, Resistance and Escape school at NAS North Island, San Diego. He left the US Navy as a petty officer second class.

His story was featured on Season 6, Episode 15 of Comedy Central's Drunk History. It was also shown on the streaming provider Amazon Prime, The Night Shift, season four, episode seven.

The Unlikely War Hero: A Vietnam War POW's Story of Courage and Resilience in the Hanoi Hilton, a slice-of-life biography focusing on Hegdahl's Vietnam War and post-war experiences, by the journalist and historian Marc Leepson, was published in December 2024 by Stackpole Books.

== Awards ==

Purple Heart	Combat Action Ribbon	Navy Meritorious Civilian Service Award
Navy Meritorious Unit Commendation	Prisoner of War Medal	National Defense Service Medal
Vietnam Service Medal	Republic of Vietnam Gallantry Cross Unit Citation	Vietnam Campaign Medal

== See also ==
- Jeremiah Denton – US Navy admiral and politician (1924–2014)
