= James Thomson (Queen's Park footballer) =

Scottish footballer

Personal information
- Full name: James S. J. Thomson
- Place of birth: Scotland
- Position: Right back

Senior career*
Years	Team	Apps	(Gls)
1905–1911	Queen's Park	107	(1)
1911–1913	Third Lanark	30	(0)
1913–1916	Dumbarton	50	(0)
- * Club domestic league appearances and goals

James S. J. Thomson was a Scottish amateur footballer who made over 100 appearances as a right back in the Scottish League for Queen's Park. He also played for Dumbarton and Third Lanark.

== Career statistics ==
Appearances and goals by club, season and competition
Club	Season	League			Scottish Cup		Other		Total	
Club	Season	Division	Apps	Goals	Apps	Goals	Apps	Goals	Apps	Goals
Queen's Park	1905–06	Scottish First Division	26	0	2	0	2 (Note: 2 appearances in Glasgow Merchants Charity Cup, 1 appearance in Glasgow Cup)	0	25	5
Queen's Park	1906–07	Scottish First Division	22	0	5	0	4 (Note: 3 appearances in Glasgow Cup, 1 appearance in Glasgow Merchants Charity Cup)	0	22	5
Queen's Park	1907–08	Scottish First Division	8	0	4	0	1 (Note: Appearance in Glasgow Cup)	0	30	7
Queen's Park	1908–09	Scottish First Division	23	1	4	0	0	0	36	10
Queen's Park	1909–10	Scottish First Division	16	0	6	0	1 (Note: Appearance in Glasgow Merchants Charity Cup)	0	21	5
Queen's Park	1910–11	Scottish First Division	12	0	2	0	0	0	11	0
Queen's Park	Total		107	1	23	0	8	0	138	1
Third Lanark	1911–12	Scottish First Division	26	0	3	0	—		29	0
Third Lanark	1912–13	Scottish First Division	14	0	0	0	—		14	0
Third Lanark	Total		30	0	3	0	—		33	0
Dumbarton	1913–14	Scottish First Division	22	0	5	0	—		27	0
Dumbarton	1914–15	Scottish First Division	23	1	—		—		23	1
Dumbarton	Total		55	1	5	0	—		60	1
Career total			192	2	31	0	8	0	231	2
