= Sơn Tây prison camp =

Prison camp in Vietnam

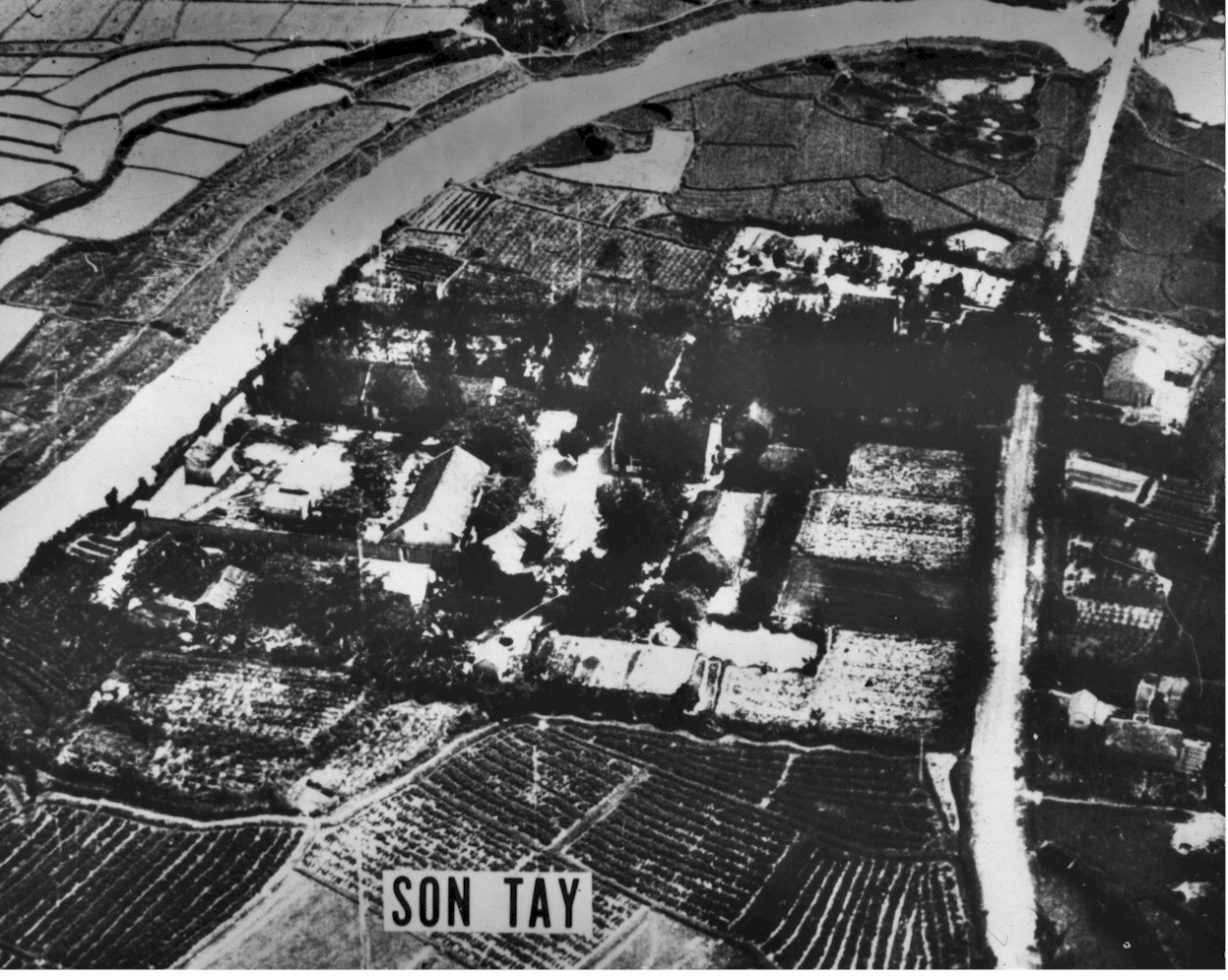
- Sơn Tây prison camp in late 1970

Site information
- Controlled by: People's Army of Vietnam
- Condition: abandoned

Location
- Coordinates: 21.1446°N 105.4958°E

Site history
- In use: 1960s–1970, 1975
- Battles/wars: Sơn Tây raid

The Sơn Tây prison camp was a POW former camp operated by North Vietnam near Sơn Tây and approximately 23 miles (37 km) west of Hanoi in the late 1960s through late 1970 and again in 1975. About 65 United States prisoners of war were held there during the middle of the Vietnam War. It was later used to house foreigners captured in South Vietnam during the 1975 spring offensive.

== Operation Ivory Coast ==
On 21 November 1970, a U.S. military force raided the camp in an attempt to rescue American POWs. However, the camp was found to have no POWs, as they had been secretly moved several months previously.

== 1975 ==
In April/May 1975, the camp was returned to use when CIA agent James Lewis was taken there after being captured at Phan Rang Air Base on 16 April 1975 during the People's Army of Vietnam Spring Offensive. Lewis was joined several months later by 13 others, including Paul Struharik, a USAID official captured at Ban Me Thuot, Australian journalist Peter Whitlock, graduate student Jay Scarborough and missionaries John and Carolyn Miller and their family.

On 30 October 1975 the prisoners were transported by a UN-chartered C-47 to Vientiane, Laos and then on to Bangkok, Thailand.
