= James T. Thompson =

Mayor of Birkenhead, England

James Thomas Thompson, JP (c. 1849–1921) was the Mayor of Birkenhead, England c. 1899.

During his time in office, he earned many presentation pieces, several of which were sold at Bonhams, at Chester, on 4 September 2012.
