= Jimmy Thomson (footballer, born 1948) =

Scottish footballer

Personal information
- Full name: James Arnott Thomson
- Date of birth: 28 June 1948 (age 78)
- Place of birth: Glasgow, Scotland
- Position: Midfielder

Senior career*
Years	Team	Apps	(Gls)
1967–1968	Petershill		
1968–1971	Newcastle United	5	(0)
1970	→ Barrow (loan)	2	(0)
1971–1972	Grimsby Town	26	(4)
1972–1973	Morton		
1973–1974	South Shields		
1974–1976	Gateshead United		
1976–1977	Evenwood Town		
1977–19??	Newcastle Blue Star		
- * Club domestic league appearances and goals

James Arnott Thomson (born 28 June 1948) is a Scottish former professional footballer who played as a midfielder.
