= James Thompson (cartographer) =

18th century British cartographer

James Thompson was a leading 18th century cartographer and mariner. He produced one of the first maps of York – his Plan of the City of York and Ainsty (1785), which was based on the work of Francis White.

Thompson's 1777 sea chart map, A chart of the North Sea, from the Forelands to North Bergen, and from the Scaw to the Orkneys and Shetland. Shewing the harbours, havens, bays and roads, banks, rocks, shoals, depths of water, &ca. with the most remarkable appearances of land. Done from various surveys, of the British, Dutch, and Danish pilots, depicts coastal features, structures within the ocean, such as sandbanks as well as "remarkable appearances of land". The top of the chart is oriented to the West, rather than to the North. It has been described as "Captain Thompson’s magnum opus".

== Maps held in collections ==
- 1777 A chart of the North Sea, from the Forelands to North Bergen, and from the Scaw to the Orkneys and Shetland. Shewing the harbours, havens, bays and roads, banks, rocks, shoals, depths of water, &ca. with the most remarkable appearances of land. Done from various surveys, of the British, Dutch, and Danish pilots by James Thompson, Mariner, 1777. Published by Robert Sayer; the map is held in the permanent collection of the National Maritime Museum, Royal Museums Greenwich, and in the Bodelian Library Map Room.
- 1785 Plan of the City of York and Ainsty, based on the work of Francis White. This is a coloured etching, size 664x860mm, and is currently located in York City Art Gallery and is part of the Evelyn Collection.
