= Jamie Thompson (footballer) =

Australian rules footballer

Personal information
- Full name: Jamie Thompson
- Born: 29 May 1892
- Died: 12 July 1975 (aged 83)
- Original team: Geelong West

Playing career^{1}
Years	Club	Games (Goals)
1915	Geelong	12 (0)
- ^{1} Playing statistics correct to the end of 1915.

Jamie Thompson (29 May 1892 – 12 July 1975) was an Australian rules footballer who played with Geelong in the Victorian Football League (VFL).
