= James Matthew Thompson =

English historian

James Matthew Thompson, FBA (27 September 1878 – 8 October 1956) was an English historian and theologian.

The son of the priest Henry Lewis Thompson (warden of Radley College) and his wife Catherine (a daughter of Sir James Paget), he attended Winchester College, Christ Church, Oxford, and Cuddesdon Theological College. He was ordained a deacon in 1903 and was a curate in Poplar before being ordained a priest and elected a fellow of Magdalen College, Oxford, in 1904 (serving until retirement in 1938). He was also the college's dean of divinity from 1906 to 1915 and Senior Proctor at the University of Oxford in 1916–17. Taking leave from his college duties during the First World War, he served with the Red Cross in France, worked at the Admiralty and taught in a school before returning to his college duties in 1919. He served as its bursar in the 1920s and as vice-president (1935–37). Thompson's earlier theological work took a highly liberal stance, which led to calls for his resignation from Magdalen in the early 20th century. Later, he published books on modern European history and was university lecturer in French history from 1931.

== Works ==
- An Annotated Psalter, (1908)
- Jesus, According To St Mark, (1910)
- Synototic Gospels, (1910)
- Miracles In The New Testament, (1911)
- Through Facts To Faith, (1912)
- Lectures On Foreign History 1494-1789, (1925; revised ed. 1930)
- Leaders Of The French Revolution, (1929)
- Historical Geography Of Europe, (1929)
- My Apologia [written as: J M T], (1940)
- The French Revolution, (1943)
- Collected Verse, 1939-1946, (1947)
- Robespierre and the French Revolution, (1952)
- Louis Napoleon and the Second Empire, (1954)
