= Floyd James Thompson =

American special forces colonel

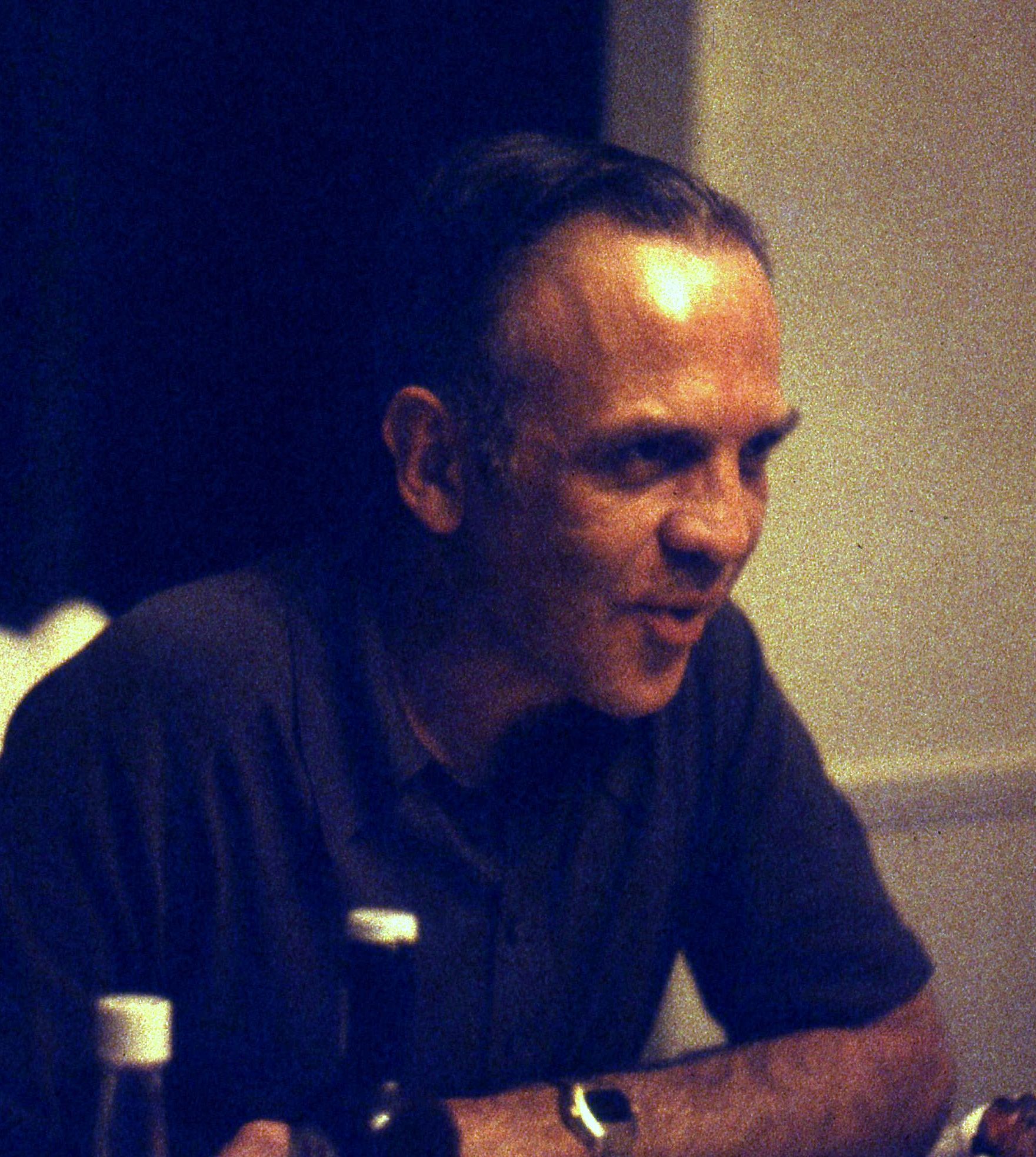
- Thompson on Easter Saturday in 1975
- Born: July 8, 1933; Bergenfield, New Jersey, U.S.
- Died: July 16, 2002 (aged 69); Key West, Florida, U.S.
- Relatives: 4
- Military career
- Allegiance: United States of America
- Branch: United States Army
- Service years: 1956–1982
- Rank: Colonel
- Nickname: Jim
- Units: 7th Special Forces Group
- Conflicts: Vietnam War
- Awards: Army Distinguished Service Medal; Silver Star; Legion of Merit; Bronze Star Medal with "V" Device; Purple Heart (2); Air Medal

Floyd James "Jim" Thompson (July 8, 1933 – July 16, 2002) was a United States Army colonel. He was the longest-held American prisoner of war, spending nearly nine years in captivity in the forests and mountains of South Vietnam, Laos, and North Vietnam during the Vietnam War.

== Early life ==
Jim Thompson was born July 8, 1933, in Bergenfield, New Jersey, as the son of a bus driver. He graduated from Bergenfield High School in 1951 and he married Alyce DeVries a year later. Thompson worked for the A&P supermarket, before he was drafted by the United States Army on June 14, 1956. He was at first a very truculent, rebellious soldier, but then decided that he liked the military. After basic training at Fort Dix, New Jersey, he decided to make the military his career.

== Military career ==
After completing Officer Candidate School (OCS), Thompson served stateside and also spent a year in Korea. He was stationed at Fort Bragg when he was recruited into the Army Special Forces as a Green Beret. After completing Ranger School and United States Army Airborne School, he served as an instructor with the U.S. Army Infantry School at Fort Benning, Georgia, from August 1958 to June 1960. His next assignment was as a platoon commander in the 2nd Battalion of the 34th Infantry Regiment, stationed in South Korea from June 1960 to July 1961. Thompson then served as a reenlistment officer with Headquarters XVIII Airborne Corps at Fort Bragg, North Carolina, from September 1961 to September 1962, and then as a staff officer with 1st Special Forces Group at Fort Bragg, from September 1962 to December 1963.

=== Vietnam War ===
Captain Thompson went to Vietnam in December 1963. Prior to his deployment, he had not heard of the country. He was to serve only a six-month tour of duty but was captured on March 26, 1964. He was released on March 16, 1973, ten days short of nine years.

==== Capture ====
On March 26, 1964, Thompson was a passenger on an observation plane (an L-19/O-1 Bird Dog) flown by Captain Richard L. Whitesides when it was downed by enemy small arms fire at 16°39′12″N 106°46′21″E, about 20 kilometers from Thompson's Special Forces Camp near Quảng Trị, South Vietnam. Thompson survived the crash with burns, a bullet wound across the cheek, and a broken back. Whitesides was killed in the crash. Thompson was quickly captured by the Viet Cong.

Aerial search and ground patrols failed to find any trace of the aircraft. On March 27, 1964, an Army officer visited Thompson's home and told his pregnant wife Alyce that he was missing. The trauma sent her into labor and their son was born that evening.

==== Prisoner of war ====
Thompson spent the next nine years (3,278 days) as a prisoner of war, first at the hands of the Viet Cong in the South Vietnam forests, until he was moved in 1967 to the Hanoi prison system. During his captivity, he was tortured, starved, and isolated from other American POWs. His captors pressured him to sign statements proving that the United States' involvement in Vietnam was criminal. He refused and was beaten, choked and hanged by his thumbs. They also tied his elbows behind his back and hung him from a rafter until he passed out. At night he was tossed into a tiny wooden cage, where he was handcuffed and shackled in leg irons. At one point, Thompson did not speak to another American for over five years. In January 1973, Thompson was transferred to Hỏa Lò Prison. He was released with the other POWs in mid-March 1973 in Operation Homecoming.

==== Return to the United States ====
The years following Thompson's release were not happy ones. His troubled life was chronicled in an oral biography called Glory Denied by Tom Philpott. Although Thompson was promoted to lieutenant colonel upon release and then to full colonel, he had missed the most important years of his military career while in prison. He had no formal military education beyond OCS and lacked even a college degree or experience as a company commander.

He had difficulty adjusting to a vastly changed peacetime Army. In addition, Thompson's marriage had been troubled even before his captivity, and his wife Alyce, believing him dead, was living with another man at the time he was repatriated. He and his wife divorced in 1975. Alyce told author Tom Philpott that she believed prison had affected her husband's mind. She said he suffered from nightmares and was abusive towards both her and the children. Thompson later remarried but divorced soon afterwards. Thompson never formed any kind of a relationship with his children. His daughters were 6, 5 and 4 when he left, and his son was born the day of his capture. Only his eldest child barely remembered him. He eventually became completely estranged from all of them.

Thompson said that one of the things that helped him cope with his brutal imprisonment was thinking of the fine family that awaited his return. He developed a very serious drinking problem and was in several military hospitals for treatment.

In 1977, Thompson attempted suicide with an overdose of pills and alcohol. His superiors told author Philpott that had it not been for Thompson's status as a hero, he would have been dismissed from service because of his alcoholism. In 1981, while still on active duty, Thompson suffered a massive heart attack and a severe stroke. He was in a coma for months and was left seriously disabled. He was paralyzed on one side and could speak only in brief phrases for the rest of his life.

=== Retirement ===
The stroke that left Thompson's left side paralyzed and his age contributed to his forced retirement from active duty in the Army. A ceremony was held for him in The Pentagon on January 28, 1982. Thompson received the Distinguished Service Medal in appreciation for his 25 years of service to his country as an Army officer. Because of his recent stroke, he had a hard time speaking, so Michael Chamowitz, his close friend and lawyer, read his retirement speech.

I am honored to receive this award (the Distinguished Service Medal) today but at the same time I am saddened to be leaving active military service. The Army has been my life and I am proud of each of my twenty-five years of service.

Of those 25 years, I spent nine as prisoner of war. Those days were grim, and survival was a struggle. I was able to withstand that long agony because I never lost my determination to live—no matter how painful that became—because I love my country and never lost faith in her, and because I had dreams of what my life would be like upon my return to America. Those dreams were always, unquestionably, of a life that was Army. I found that the dream of continued service gave me a goal that helped me survive my years as a POW.

After my return from Vietnam, the opportunity to serve became the motivating force in my life. Military service has given me my greatest challenges and my greatest rewards. I have worked hard for sound leadership development in the Army and for realistic training. The greatest problem faced by POWs was fear of the unknown. This fear can be reduced, not only for the potential POW but across the awesome environment of the battlefield, by training which is honest enough to address the real issue of combat and which is tough enough to approximate battlefield conditions.

No, I do not now retire freely—there was much I still wanted to do—but circumstances present me no alternative. I leave active military service because I must. But for the rest of my life, the Army will be no less a part of me, and of what I am, than what it has always been.

Colonel Floyd James Thompson

January 29, 1982

== Later years and death ==
In 1981, Thompson moved to Key West, where he remained active in the community, according to the Monroe County Office of Veterans Affairs. In 1988, Thompson and a number of other former prisoners of war were awarded medals by President Ronald Reagan.

In 1990, Thompson's son Jim was convicted of murder and imprisoned for sixteen years.

On July 8, 2002, the staff of Joint Interagency Task Force (JIATF) East and some of his close friends threw Thompson a birthday party. He was described as being in high spirits and full of excitement. During the celebration, he quoted General Douglas MacArthur: "Old soldiers never die, they just fade away."

Eight days later, on July 16, 2002, Thompson was found dead in his Key West By the Sea condominium, at the age of 69. His body was cremated, and his ashes scattered at sea off the coast of Florida. There is a memorial marker for him at Andersonville National Cemetery.

In an update to Glory Denied, Tom Philpott reported that Alyce Thompson died of cancer in 2009. He also mentioned that Thompson's daughter Ruth had suffered three disabling heart attacks and had lost a son to suicide. Philpott reported that Ruth had told him the strength of character that she inherited from both her parents had helped her through the difficult times. Glory Denied was later turned into an opera written by Tom Cipullo.

== Military awards ==
In October 1974, Thompson started to receive medals and awards in recognition for his service in Vietnam. South Vietnam gave him the country's highest award to Allied enlisted military personnel for valor, the Republic of Vietnam Military Merit Medal.

In recognition of his escape from a Viet Cong POW camp for two days in October 1971, Thompson received the Silver Star. For his nine years in captivity, Thompson received the Army Distinguished Service Medal, Bronze Star Medal, and Legion of Merit. The Bronze Star recognized his continuous resistance to the enemy. The Legion of Merit recognized his suffering for his nine years in captivity.

A ceremony was held on June 24, 1988, in the White House honoring POWs from World War I, World War II, Korea and Vietnam. Two representatives were picked from each war to receive the Prisoner of War Medal. Thompson and Everett Alvarez were chosen to represent POWs from Vietnam.

His military decorations and awards include:

| U.S. Awards & Decorations Personal decorations Army Distinguished Service Medal Silver Star Legion of Merit Bronze Star with "V" Device Purple Heart with Bronze Oak Leaf Cluster Air Medal | U.S. Awards & Decorations Unit awards Presidential Unit Citation Meritorious Unit Commendation Service awards Prisoner of War Medal Army Good Conduct Medal Campaign & Service awards National Defense Service Medal Armed Forces Expeditionary Medal Vietnam Service Medal w/ three 3/16" Silver Stars and one 3/16" Bronze Star Korea Defense Service Medal Service & Training awards Armed Forces Reserve Medal with Bronze Hourglass Army Service Ribbon Army Overseas Ribbon with Bronze Numeral 2 |

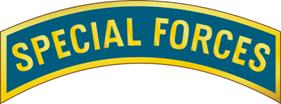
U.S. Awards & Decorations Badges and Tab awards Combat Infantryman Badge Parachutist Badge Special Forces Tab Ranger Tab 18 Overseas Service Bars

Foreign Awards & Decorations Personal decorations, Unit awards, and Service awards Republic of Vietnam Military Merit Medal Republic of Vietnam Gallantry Cross with Palm and Gold Star Republic of Vietnam Armed Forces Honor Medal (1st Class) Republic of Korea Presidential Unit Citation Republic of Vietnam Gallantry Cross Unit Citation with Palm Republic of Vietnam Civil Actions Medal Unit Citation with Palm Republic of Vietnam Campaign Medal with 1960- Device

== See also ==
- Prisoner of War Camps
- Aircraft losses of the Vietnam War
- Awards and decorations of the Vietnam War
- U.S. prisoners of war during the Vietnam War
