= James Thompson (Rector of Lincoln College, Oxford) =

James Thompson, DD (born Ilkley 9 March 1802; died Oxford 26 December 1860) was an Oxford college head in the 19th century.

He graduated BA from Lincoln College, Oxford in 1823, MA in 1826 and BD in 1833. He was a Fellow of Lincoln from 1823 and also held the College living at Twyford, Buckinghamshire. Radford was Rector of Lincoln College, Oxford, from 1851 until his death.
