= James Robinson Risner =

US Air Force general (1925–2013)

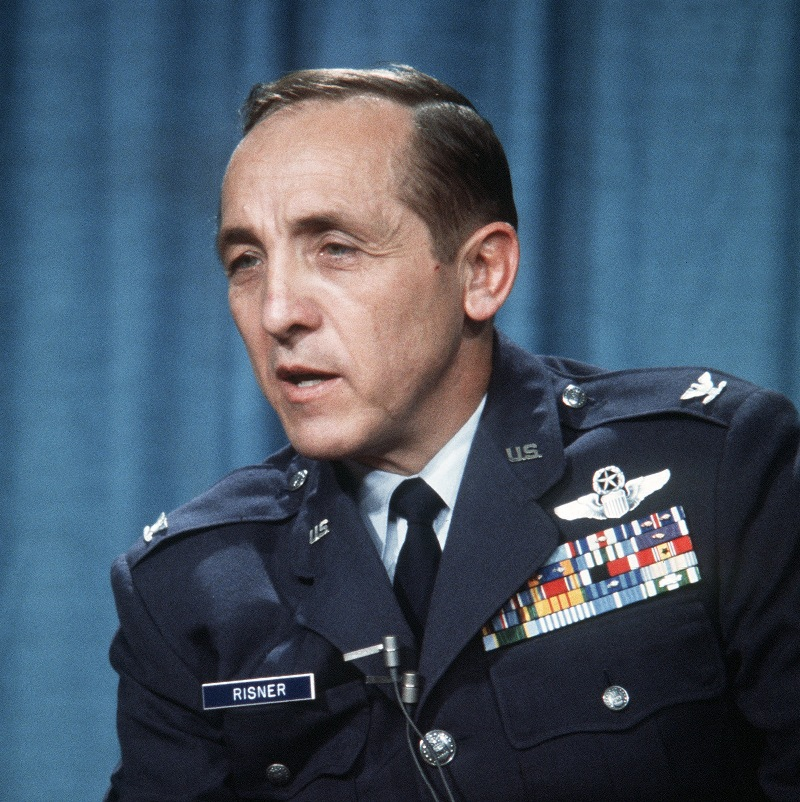
- Risner in 1973 after being released as a POW by the North Vietnamese
- Born: January 16, 1925; Mammoth Spring, Arkansas, U.S.
- Died: October 22, 2013 (aged 88); Bridgewater, Virginia, U.S.
- Burial place: Arlington National Cemetery
- Military career
- Allegiance: United States
- Branch: United States Army Air Forces; United States Air Force
- Service years: 1943–1946; 1951–1976
- Rank: Brigadier General
- Nickname: Robbie
- Commands: 832d Air Division; 67th Tactical Fighter Squadron; 34th Fighter-Day Squadron; 81st Fighter-Bomber Squadron
- Conflicts: World War II; Korean War; Vietnam War
- Awards: Air Force Cross (2); Air Force Distinguished Service Medal; Silver Star (2); Distinguished Flying Cross (3); Bronze Star (3); Purple Heart (4); Air Medal (8)

Brigadier General James Robinson "Robbie" Risner (January 16, 1925 – October 22, 2013) was a fighter pilot in the United States Air Force, and a senior leader among U.S. prisoners of war during the Vietnam War.

During the Vietnam War, Risner was a double recipient of the Air Force Cross, the second highest military decoration for valor that can be awarded to a member of the United States Air Force, awarded the first for valor in aerial combat and the second for gallantry as a prisoner of war of the North Vietnamese for more than seven years. He was the first living recipient of the medal.

Risner became an ace in the Korean War and commanded a squadron of F-105 Thunderchiefs in the first missions of Operation Rolling Thunder in 1965. He flew a combined 163 combat missions, was shot down twice, and was credited with destroying eight MiG-15s. Risner retired as a brigadier general in 1976.

At his death, Air Force Chief of Staff General Mark A. Welsh III observed: "Brig. Gen. James Robinson "Robbie" Risner was part of that legendary group who served in three wars, built an Air Force, and gave us an enduring example of courage and mission success... Today's Airmen know we stand on the shoulders of giants. One of 'em is 9 feet tall... and headed west in full afterburner."

== Childhood ==
Risner was born in Mammoth Spring, Arkansas, in 1925, but moved to Tulsa, Oklahoma, in 1931. His father was originally a sharecropper, then during the Great Depression became a day laborer for the Works Progress Administration. By the time Risner entered high school, his father was self-employed, selling used cars. Risner worked numerous part-time jobs in his youth to help the family, including newspaper delivery, errand boy and soda jerk for a drug store, for the Tulsa Chamber of Commerce at age 16, as a welder, and for his father polishing cars.

Risner had a religious upbringing as a member of the 1st Assembly of God Church. He wrestled for Tulsa Central High School, where he graduated in 1942.

In addition to a love of sports, Risner's interests were primarily in riding horses and motorcycles.

== Military career ==
=== Army Air Forces and Air National Guard ===
Risner enlisted in the United States Army Air Forces as an aviation cadet in April 1943 and attended flight training at Williams Field, Arizona, where he was awarded his pilot wings and a commission as 2nd Lieutenant in May 1944. He completed transition training in P-40 Warhawk and P-39 Airacobra fighters before being assigned to the 30th Fighter Squadron in Panama.

The 30th FS was based on a primitive airstrip without permanent facilities at Aguadulce, on the Gulf of Panama. Risner noted to a biographer that his tour under these conditions amounted to as much flying as he desired but a distinct lack of discipline on the ground. When the squadron was relocated to Howard Field in the Panama Canal Zone in January 1945 to transition to P-38 Lightning fighters, its pilots were soon banned from the Officers Club for rowdiness and vandalism.

In 1946, Risner was involved in an off-duty motorcycle accident. While undergoing hospital treatment in the Army, he met his first wife, Kathleen Shaw, a nurse from Ware Shoals, South Carolina. Risner and Shaw became engaged on a ship and were discharged and married the next month.

In civilian life, Risner tried a succession of jobs, training as an auto mechanic, operating a gas station, and managing a service garage. He also joined the Oklahoma Air National Guard, becoming a P-51 Mustang pilot and flew nearly every weekend. On one occasion, Risner became lost in the fringes of a hurricane on a flight to Brownsville, Texas. Forced to land on a dry lakebed, he found that he was in Mexico and encountered bandits, but successfully flew his Mustang to Brownsville after the storm had passed. He received an unofficial rebuke from the American embassy for flying an armed fighter into the sovereign territory of a foreign nation, but for diplomatic reasons, the flight was officially ignored.

=== Korean War ===
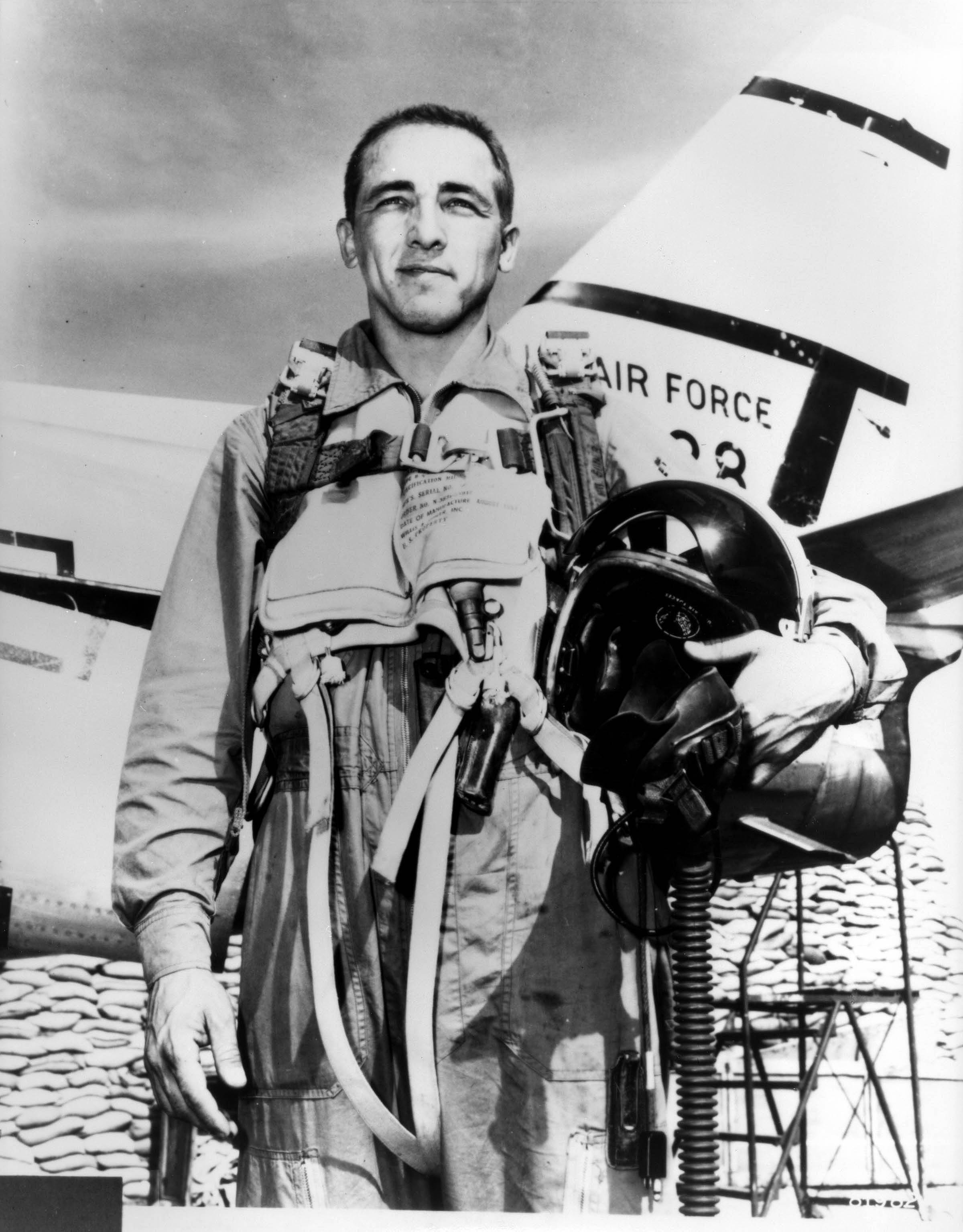
Risner posing with an F-86

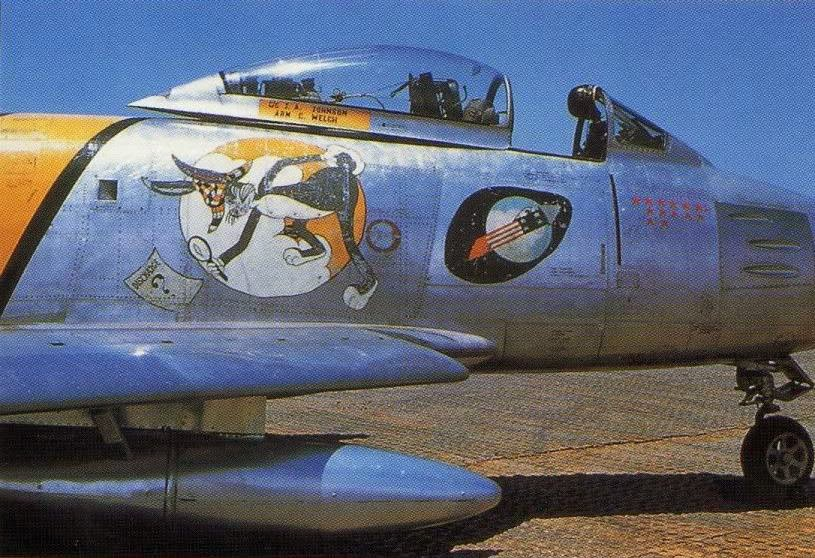
Robbie Risner's F-86 with the 336th Fighter Squadron in 1953

Risner was recalled to active duty in February 1951 while assigned to the 185th Tactical Fighter Squadron of the OKANG at Will Rogers Field in Oklahoma City, Oklahoma. He subsequently received training in the F-80 Shooting Star at Shaw Air Force Base, South Carolina.

Risner's determination to be assigned to a combat unit was nearly ended when on his last day before going overseas he broke his hand and wrist falling from a horse. Robinson deliberately concealed the injury, which would have grounded him, until able to convince a flight surgeon that the injury had healed. He actually had his cast removed to fly his first mission.

Risner arrived in Korea on May 10, 1952, assigned to the 15th Reconnaissance Squadron at Kimpo Air Base. In June, when the 336th Fighter-Interceptor Squadron, also at Kimpo, sought experienced pilots, he arranged a transfer to 4th Fighter Wing through the intervention of a former OKANG associate. Risner was often assigned to fly F-86E-10, AF serial no. 51-2824, nicknamed Ohio Mike and bearing a large cartoon rendition of Bugs Bunny as nose art, in which he achieved most of his aerial victories.

His first two months of combat saw little contact with MiGs, and although a flight leader, he took a three-day leave to Japan in early August. The day after his arrival, he returned to Korea when he learned that MiGs were operational. Arriving at Kimpo in the middle of the night, he joined his flight which was on alert status. On August 5, 1952, A flight of four F-86 Sabres launched and encountered 14 MiG-15s. In a brief dogfight, Risner shot down one to score his first aerial victory.

On September 15, Risner's flight escorted F-84 Thunderjet fighter-bombers attacking a chemical plant on the Yalu River near the East China Sea. (Note: Risner's call sign this date was "John Red Lead". (Davis, p. 43)) During their defense of the bombers, Risner's flight overflew the MiG base at Antung Airfield, China. Fighting one MiG at nearly supersonic speeds at ground level, Risner pursued it down a dry riverbed and across low hills to an airfield 35 miles (56 km) inside China. (Note: Risner is quoted as identifying the airfield as "Tak Tung Kau". (Davis, p. 46)) Scoring numerous hits on the MiG, shooting off its canopy, and setting it on fire, Risner chased it between hangars of the Communist airbase, where he shot it down into parked fighters. (Note: Another flight member, 1st Lt. Willard P. Dunbar, reported that the MiG pilot was a red-headed Russian who shook his fist at Risner before crashing. (Thompson and McLaren, p. 67))

On the return flight, Risner's wingman, 1st Lt. Joseph Logan, was struck in his fuel tanks by anti-aircraft fire over Antung. In an effort to help him reach Kimpo, Risner attempted to push Logan's aircraft by having him shut down his engine and inserting the nose of his own jet into the tailpipe of Logan's, an unprecedented and untried maneuver. The object of the maneuver was to push Logan's aircraft to the island of Cho Do off the North Korean coast, where the Air Force maintained a helicopter rescue detachment. Jet fuel and hydraulic fluid spewed out from the damaged Sabre onto Risner's canopy, obscuring his vision, and turbulence kept separating the two jets. Risner was able to re-establish contact and guide the powerless plane out over the sea until fluids threatened to stall his own engine. Near Cho Do, Logan bailed out after calling to Risner, "I'll see you at the base tonight." Although Logan came down close to shore and was a strong swimmer, he became entangled in his parachute shrouds and drowned. Risner shut down his own engine in an attempt to save fuel, but eventually his engine flamed out and he glided to a deadstick landing at Kimpo.

On September 21, he shot down his fifth MiG, becoming the 20th U.S. jet ace. In October 1952 Risner was promoted to major and named operations officer of the 336th FIS. Risner flew 108 missions in Korea and was credited with the destruction of eight MiG-15s, his final victory occurring January 21, 1953.

=== Regular Air Force career ===
Risner was commissioned into the regular Air Force and assigned to the 50th Fighter-Bomber Wing at Cannon Air Force Base, Clovis, New Mexico, in March 1953, where he became operations officer of the 81st Fighter Bomber Squadron. He flew F-86s with the 50th Wing to activate Hahn Air Base, West Germany, where he became commander of the 81st FBS in November 1954.

In July 1956, he was transferred to George Air Force Base, California as operations officer of the 413th Fighter Wing. Subsequently, he served as commander of the 34th Fighter-Day Squadron, also at George Air Force Base.

During his tour of duty at George Air Force Base, Risner was selected to fly the Charles A. Lindbergh Commemoration Flight from New York to Paris. Ferrying a two-seat F-100F Super Sabre nicknamed Spirit of St. Louis II to Europe on the same route as Lindbergh, he set a transatlantic speed record, covering the distance in 6 hours and 37 minutes.

From August 1960 to July 1961, he attended the Air War College at Maxwell Air Force Base, Alabama. He next served on the joint staff of Commander-in-Chief, Pacific (CINCPAC) in Hawaii.

=== Vietnam War ===
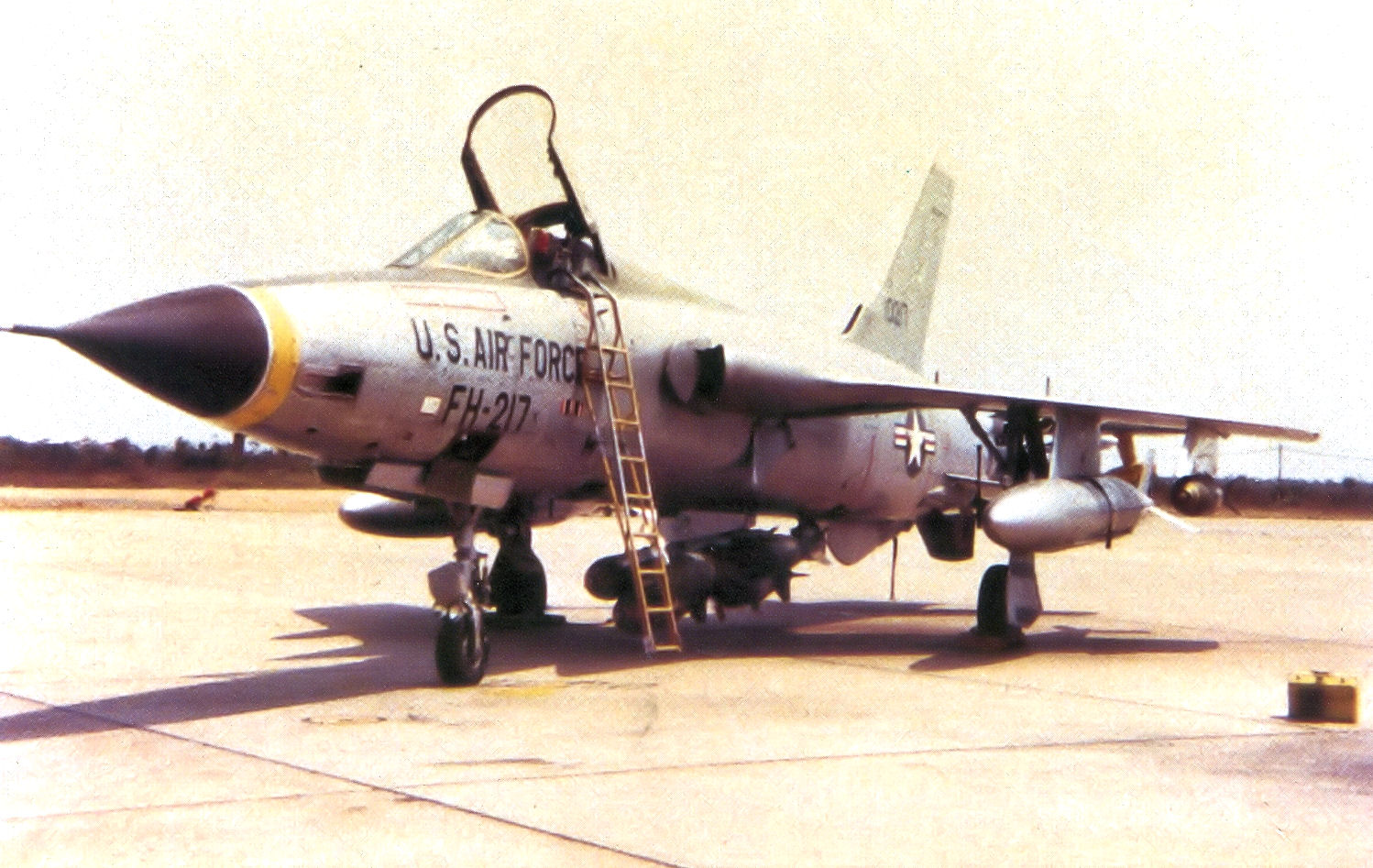
12th TFS Republic F-105D-25-RE Thunderchief 61–0217. On 16 September 1965, Risner was flying this aircraft when he was shot down by anti-aircraft artillery.

In August 1964, Lieutenant Colonel Risner took command of the 67th Tactical Fighter Squadron, an F-105D Thunderchief fighter-bomber unit based at Kadena AB, Okinawa, and part of the 18th Tactical Fighter Wing. The following January he led a detachment of seven aircraft to Da Nang Air Base to fly combat strikes which included a mission in Laos on January 13 where he and his pilots were later on decorated for destroying a bridge, but Risner was also verbally reprimanded for losing an aircraft while bombing a second bridge not authorized by his orders. (Note: The downed aircraft was the first F-105 lost to hostile fire in Southeast Asia, but the pilot, Capt. Albert C. Vollmer, was rescued.) On February 18, 1965, as part of an escalation in air attacks directed by President Lyndon B. Johnson that resulted in the commencement of Operation Rolling Thunder, the 67th TFS began a tour of temporary duty at Korat RTAFB, Thailand, under the control of the 2d Air Division. (Note: In 1965 the facilities at Korat RTAFB were still primitive and the Air Force living area was referred to as "Camp Nasty".)

Risner's squadron led the first Rolling Thunder strike on March 2, bombing an ammunition dump at Xom Biang approximately 10 miles (16 km) north of the Demilitarized Zone. The strike force consisted of more than 100 F-105, F-100 and B-57 aircraft, and in the congested airspace, heavy anti-aircraft artillery (AAA) fire seriously disrupted its coordination and radio communications. Risner's squadron was tasked with flak suppression, dropping CBU-2 "cluster bombs" from extremely low altitude. His wingman Capt. Robert V. "Boris" Baird was shot down on the opening pass and the mission was in danger of collapsing when Risner took charge. After the last strike had been delivered, Risner and the two surviving members of his flight remained in the area, directing the search and rescue mission for Baird until their fuel ran low. Risner, in a battle damaged aircraft, diverted to Da Nang Air Base for landing. (Note: Five USAF aircraft, including three of Risner's F-105s, were shot down on the Xom Biang strike, but all of the 67th TFS pilots including Baird were rescued.)

On March 22, 1965, while leading two flights of F-105s attacking a radar site near Vinh, North Vietnam, Risner was hit by ground fire when he circled back over the target. He maneuvered his aircraft over the Gulf of Tonkin, ejected a mile offshore and was rescued after fifteen minutes in the water. (Note: Risner was flying F-105D 62-4233 on March 22, 1965. (Campbell and Hill, p. 90))

On April 3 and 4, 1965, Risner led two large missions against the Thanh Hóa Bridge in North Vietnam. On the afternoon of April 3, the strike package of Rolling Thunder Mission 9 Alpha consisted of 79 aircraft, including 46 F-105s. 16 of those carried AGM-12 Bullpup missiles, while another 30 carried eight 750-pound bombs each, half of which were designated for the railroad and highway bridge. The force had clear conditions but encountered a severe glare in the target area that made the bridge difficult to acquire for attacks with the Bullpups. Only one Bullpup could be guided at a time, and on his second pass, Risner's aircraft took a hit just as the missile struck the bridge. Fighting a serious fuel leak and a smoke-filled cockpit in addition to anti-aircraft fire from the ground, he again nursed his crippled aircraft to Danang. The use of Bullpups against the bridge had been completely ineffectual, resulting in the scheduling of a second mission the next day with 48 F-105s attacking the bridge without destroying it. The missions saw the first interception of U.S. aircraft by North Vietnamese MiG-17 fighters, resulting in the loss of two F-105s and pilots of the last flight, struck by a hit-and-run attack while waiting for their run at the target.

Risner's exploits earned him the award of the Air Force Cross and resulted in his being featured as the cover portrait of the April 23, 1965 issue of Time magazine. The 67th TFS ended its first deployment to Korat on April 26 but returned from Okinawa on August 16 for a second tour of combat duty over North Vietnam.

==== Shootdown and capture ====
On August 12, 1965, U.S. Air Force and Navy air units received authorization to attack surface-to-air missile sites. Initial attempts to locate and destroy the SA-2 Guideline sites, known as Iron Hand missions, were both unsuccessful and costly. Tactics were revised in which "Hunter-Killer Teams" were created. Employed at low altitudes, the "hunters" located the missiles and attacked their radar control vans with canisters of napalm, both to knock out the SAM's missile guidance and to mark the target for the "killers", which followed up the initial attack using 750-pound bombs to destroy the site.

On the morning of September 16, 1965, on an Iron Hand sortie, Risner scheduled himself for the mission as the "hunter" element of a Hunter-Killer Team searching for a SAM site in the vicinity of Tuong Loc, 80 miles (130 km) south of Hanoi and 10 miles (16 km) northeast of the Thanh Hoa Bridge. (Note: Risner was "Oak Lead" on September 16, 1965, flying F-105D 61-0217. (Risner, p. 10; Campbell and Hill, p. 87)) Risner's aircraft was at very low altitude flying at approximately 600 miles per hour (970 km/h), approaching a site that was likely a decoy luring aircraft into a concentration of AAA. Heavy ground fire struck Risner's F-105 in its air intakes when he popped up over a hill to make his attack. Again he attempted to fly to the Gulf of Tonkin, but ejected when the aircraft, on fire, pitched up out of control. He was captured by North Vietnamese while still trying to extricate himself from his parachute. He was on his 55th combat mission at the time. (Note: Ironically, Risner's portrait was featured that month in a National Geographic article on the USAF for being the first living recipient of the Air Force Cross. (Weaver, National Geographic, p. 306))

==== Prisoner of war ====
"We were lucky to have Risner. With (Captain James) Stockdale we had wisdom. With Risner we had spirituality."

— Commander Everett Alvarez Jr. – 1st U.S. pilot held as a Prisoner of War in Southeast Asia

After several days of travel on foot and by truck, Risner was imprisoned in Hỏa Lò Prison, known as "The Hanoi Hilton" to American POWs. However, after two weeks he was moved to Cu Loc Prison, known as "The Zoo", where he was confronted during interrogations with his Time magazine cover and told that his capture had been highly coveted by the North Vietnamese. Returned to Hỏa Lò Prison as punishment for disseminating behavior guidelines to the POWs under his nominal command, Risner was severely tortured for 32 days, culminating in his coerced signing of an apologetic confession for war crimes.

Risner spent more than three years in solitary confinement. Even so, as the officer of rank with the responsibility of maintaining order, from 1965 to 1973 he helped lead American resistance in the North Vietnamese prison complex through the use of improvised messaging techniques ("tap code"), endearing himself to fellow prisoners with his faith and optimism. It was largely thanks to the leadership of Risner and his Navy counterpart, Commander (later Vice Admiral) James Stockdale, that the POWs organized themselves to present maximum resistance. While held prisoner in Hỏa Lò, Risner served first as Senior Ranking Officer and later as Vice Commander of the provisional 4th Allied Prisoner of War Wing. He was a POW for seven years, four months, and 27 days. His five sons had been ages 3 to 16 when he was shot down and imprisoned.

His story of imprisonment drew wide acclaim after war's end. His autobiography, The Passing of the Night: My Seven Years as a Prisoner of the North Vietnamese, described seven years of torture and mistreatment by the North Vietnamese. In his book, Risner attributed faith in God and prayer as being instrumental to his surviving the Hanoi prison experience. He described how he survived a torture session in July 1967, handcuffed and in stocks after destroying two pictures of his family to prevent them from being used as propaganda by an East German film crew:

To make it, I prayed by the hour. It was automatic, almost subconscious. I did not ask God to take me out of it. I prayed he would give me strength to endure it. When it would get so bad that I did not think I could stand it, I would ask God to ease it and somehow I would make it. He kept me.

An interview with Risner appears in the 1968 four-chapter East German series Pilots in Pajamas by Walter Heynowski and Gerhard Scheumann. Their account and Risner's "differ radically".

Publication of Risner's book led to a flap with American author and Vietnam war critic Mary McCarthy in 1974. The two had met, apparently at McCarthy's request, when McCarthy visited Hanoi in April 1968. The meeting, described as "stilted", resulted in an unflattering portrait of McCarthy in Risner's book, primarily because she failed to note scars and other evidence of torture he wrote that he had made plain to her. After publication of the book, McCarthy strenuously attacked both Risner (deeming him "unlikeable" and alleging that he had "become a Vietnamese toady") and Risner's credibility in a review. Risner made no rebuttal at the time, but when interviewed by Frances Kiernan decades later, Risner described the review as "character assassination", a criticism of McCarthy's treatment supported by several of her liberal peers, including Kiernan. (Note: Kiernan said of McCarthy herself: "She just about always had the right position. The one time she was way off was about the prisoner of war in North Vietnam, Robinson Risner. She went out of her way to attack him." (Tillman, "Frances Kiernan"))

=== Post-Vietnam career and life ===
Risner was promoted to colonel after his capture, with a date of rank of November 11, 1965. He was part of the first group of prisoners released in Operation Homecoming on 12 February 1973 and returned to the United States. In July 1973, USAF assigned him to the 1st Tactical Fighter Wing at MacDill Air Force Base, Florida, where he became combat ready in the F-4 Phantom II. Risner was later transferred to Cannon Air Force Base, New Mexico, in February 1974 to command the 832d Air Division, in which he flew the F-111 Aardvark fighter-bomber. He was promoted to brigadier general in May 1974. On 1 August 1975, he became Vice Commander of the USAF Tactical Fighter Weapons Center at Nellis Air Force Base, Nevada, and retired from the Air Force on 1 August 1976.

Risner's family life during and following his imprisonment was marked by several personal tragedies. His mother and brother died while he was a POW and his eldest son Robbie Jr. died of a congenital heart defect two years after his return. In June 1975, Risner was divorced from his wife Kathleen after 29 years of marriage. In 1976, he met his second wife, Dorothy Marie ("Dot") Williams, widow of a fighter pilot who went missing in action in 1967, and subsequently married her after her missing husband was declared dead. They remained married until the end of his life, with the two younger of his four surviving sons choosing to live with him and Risner adopting her three youngest children. After retirement, Risner lived in Austin, Texas, where he worked with the D.A.R.E. program and raised quarter horses, later moving to San Antonio and Bridgewater, Virginia.

== Legacy ==
Risner is one of only four airmen with multiple awards of the Air Force Cross, a combat decoration second only to the Medal of Honor. (Note: The others are James H. Kasler (three), John A. Dramesi, and Leland T. Kennedy. (Names and Citations of Recipients of the Air Force Cross))

The USAF Weapons School Robbie Risner Award, created September 24, 1976, was donated by H. Ross Perot as a tribute to Risner and all Vietnam era prisoners of war, and is administered by the Tactical Air Command (now by Air Combat Command). The award is presented annually to the outstanding graduate of the USAF Weapons School. (Note: The first recipient of the Risner Award was Capt. Timothy A. Kinnan in 1977. (Lt. Gen. Timothy A. Kinnan, "Who is Who at NATO?" Nato.int. Retrieved 30 October 2013)) The Risner Award is a six-and-one-half foot trophy consisting of a sculpture of Risner in flight suit and helmet on a marble base, weighing approximately four tons. The trophy is permanently displayed at the United States Air Force Academy, with each winner's name inscribed on it. A miniature replica, also donated by Perot, is presented to each year's recipient as a personal memento. An identical casting, measuring four feet and weighing 300 pounds, was installed in the foyer of the USAF Weapons School at Nellis Air Force Base in October 1984. (Note: "It is said among the flying community that the Risner Award in combat aviation is like the Heisman Trophy in college football, said Vargas." (Capt. Ann Blodzinski Shaw fighter pilot named best in the Air Force Retrieved 30 October 2013))

A nine-foot bronze statue of Risner, sculpted by Lawrence M. Ludtke and mounted on a five-foot pedestal of black granite, was commissioned by Perot and dedicated in the Air Gardens at the Air Force Academy on November 16, 2001. In addition to replicating the Risner Award, the statue commemorates Risner and other POWs who were punished for holding religious services in their room at the Hanoi Hilton on February 7, 1971, in defiance of North Vietnamese authorities. The statue was made nine feet tall in memory of Risner's statement, commenting on his comrades singing "The Star-Spangled Banner" and "God Bless America", that "I felt like I was nine feet tall and could go bear hunting with a switch."

Perot helped Risner to later become the executive director of the Texans' War on Drugs, and Risner was subsequently appointed by President Ronald Reagan as a United States Delegate to the fortieth session of the United Nations General Assembly. He was also inducted into the Oklahoma Hall of Fame in November 1974 in recognition of his military service, and announced as an inductee into the Arkansas Military Veterans Hall of Fame on November 1, 2013.

In 2006, Risner appeared on an episode of the History Channel series Dogfights.

On October 19, 2012, ground was broken at the Air Force Academy for its new Center for Character and Leadership Development. In February 2012 the academy received a $3.5 million gift from the Perot Foundation to endow the General James R. Risner Senior Military Scholar at the center, who "will conduct research to advance the understanding, study and practice of the profession of arms, advise senior Academy leadership on the subject, and lead seminars, curriculum development, and classroom activities at the Academy."

The chapter squadron of the Arnold Air Society for Southern California, based on the AFROTC detachment of California State University, San Bernardino, is named for Risner.

Risner was inducted into the Arkansas Aviation Hall of Fame by the Arkansas Aviation Historical Society in 2015.

On 10 March 2018, Risner was named the Class Exemplar for the United States Air Force Academy's Class of 2021.

Kadena Air Base, currently home to the 67th Fighter Squadron (previously named the 67th Tactical Fighter Squadron while Risner took command and was subsequently shot down in Vietnam) houses a fitness center named after Risner.

== Death ==
Risner died in his sleep October 22, 2013, at his home in Bridgewater, Virginia, three days after suffering a severe stroke. Risner was buried at Arlington National Cemetery on January 23, 2014. He was eulogized by Perot and General Welsh, with fellow former POWs and current members of the 336th Fighter Squadron among those in attendance.

== Awards and decorations ==
General Risner received the following awards and decorations:

US Air Force Command Pilot Badge
Air Force Cross w/ 1 bronze oak leaf cluster
Air Force Distinguished Service Medal	Silver Star w/ 1 bronze oak leaf cluster	Distinguished Flying Cross w/ Valor device and 2 bronze oak leaf clusters
Bronze Star w/ Valor device and 2 bronze oak leaf clusters	Purple Heart w/ 3 bronze oak leaf clusters	Meritorious Service Medal w/ 2 bronze oak leaf clusters
Air Medal w/ 1 silver and 2 bronze oak leaf clusters	Joint Service Commendation Medal	Air Force Commendation Medal
Air Force Presidential Unit Citation	Air Force Outstanding Unit Award w/ Valor device and 2 bronze oak leaf clusters	Prisoner of War Medal
American Campaign Medal	World War II Victory Medal	Army of Occupation Medal
National Defense Service Medal w/ 1 bronze service star	Korean Service Medal w/ 2 bronze campaign stars	Armed Forces Expeditionary Medal
Vietnam Service Medal w/ 3 silver and 1 bronze campaign stars	Air Force Longevity Service Award w/ 1 silver and 2 bronze oak leaf clusters	Armed Forces Reserve Medal
Small Arms Expert Marksmanship Ribbon	Republic of Korea Presidential Unit Citation	Republic of Vietnam Gallantry Cross
United Nations Service Medal for Korea	Vietnam Campaign Medal	Korean War Service Medal

=== Air Force Cross citations ===
==== First award ====
Lieutenant Colonel Robinson Risner
U.S. Air Force
67th Tactical Fighter Squadron, Korat RTAFB, Thailand
Date of Action: 3 and 4 April 1965

The President of the United States, authorized by Title 10, Section 8742, United States Code, takes pleasure in presenting the Air Force Cross to Robinson Risner, Lieutenant Colonel, U.S. Air Force, for extraordinary heroism in connection with military operations against an opposing armed force on 3 and 4 April 1965. On these dates Colonel Risner led two successive operations against vitally important and heavily defended targets. Performing in the role of air coordinator, Colonel Risner arrived over the target area before the main strike force, evaluated the effectiveness of each strike, redirected subsequent strikes, and provided flak suppression against defenses that would hinder delivery aircraft in the performance of their mission. On the initial attack, while exposing himself to heavy ground fire, with complete disregard for his personal safety, Colonel Risner's aircraft sustained a direct hit in the left forward bomb-bay area, filling the cockpit with smoke and fumes. He flew his badly damaged aircraft over heavily fortified hostile territory before successfully landing at a friendly airfield. On 4 April, he again led an attacking force of fighter aircraft on a restrike against the same target. Colonel Risner initiated the attack, directing his aircraft into the target in the face of heavy automatic ground fire. His aerial skill and heroic actions set an example for the others to follow. In the course of the operation, Colonel Risner's unit encountered the first MIG force committed in aerial combat against the U.S. Forces in Southeast Asia. However, he refused to be diverted from his primary mission of completing the destruction of the assigned targets. Colonel Risner's actions not only deprived the communist force of its vital supply route and much needed equipment but further served to emphasize the high degree of U.S. determination in Southeast Asia. Through his extraordinary heroism, superb airmanship and aggressiveness, Colonel Risner reflected the highest credit upon himself and the United States Air Force.

==== Second award ====
Lieutenant Colonel James R. Risner
U.S. Air Force
For actions while a prisoner of war, U.S. Air Force
Date of Action: 31 October to 15 December 1965

The President of the United States of America, authorized by Title 10, Section 8742, United States Code, takes pleasure in presenting a Bronze Oak Leaf Cluster in lieu of a Second Award of the Air Force Cross to Lieutenant Colonel James Robinson Risner, United States Air Force, for extraordinary heroism in military operations against an opposing armed force while a Prisoner of War in North Vietnam from 31 October 1965 to 15 December 1965. During that period the Vietnamese intercepted a series of prisoner messages which clearly indicated the danger of General Risner's leadership to their exploitation methods. He was extensively tortured for information but successfully resisted their demands and established a standard of honorable conduct and resistance which was followed by hundreds of Americans after him. The extremely harsh treatment inflicted upon him was to become a way of life for him in the subsequent years. Through his extraordinary heroism, leadership, and aggressiveness in the face of the enemy, General Risner reflected the highest credit upon himself and the United States Air Force

== Notes ==
Footnotes

Citations
