= Paul Johnson (United States Air Force) =

Major general in the United States Air Force

Paul T. Johnson
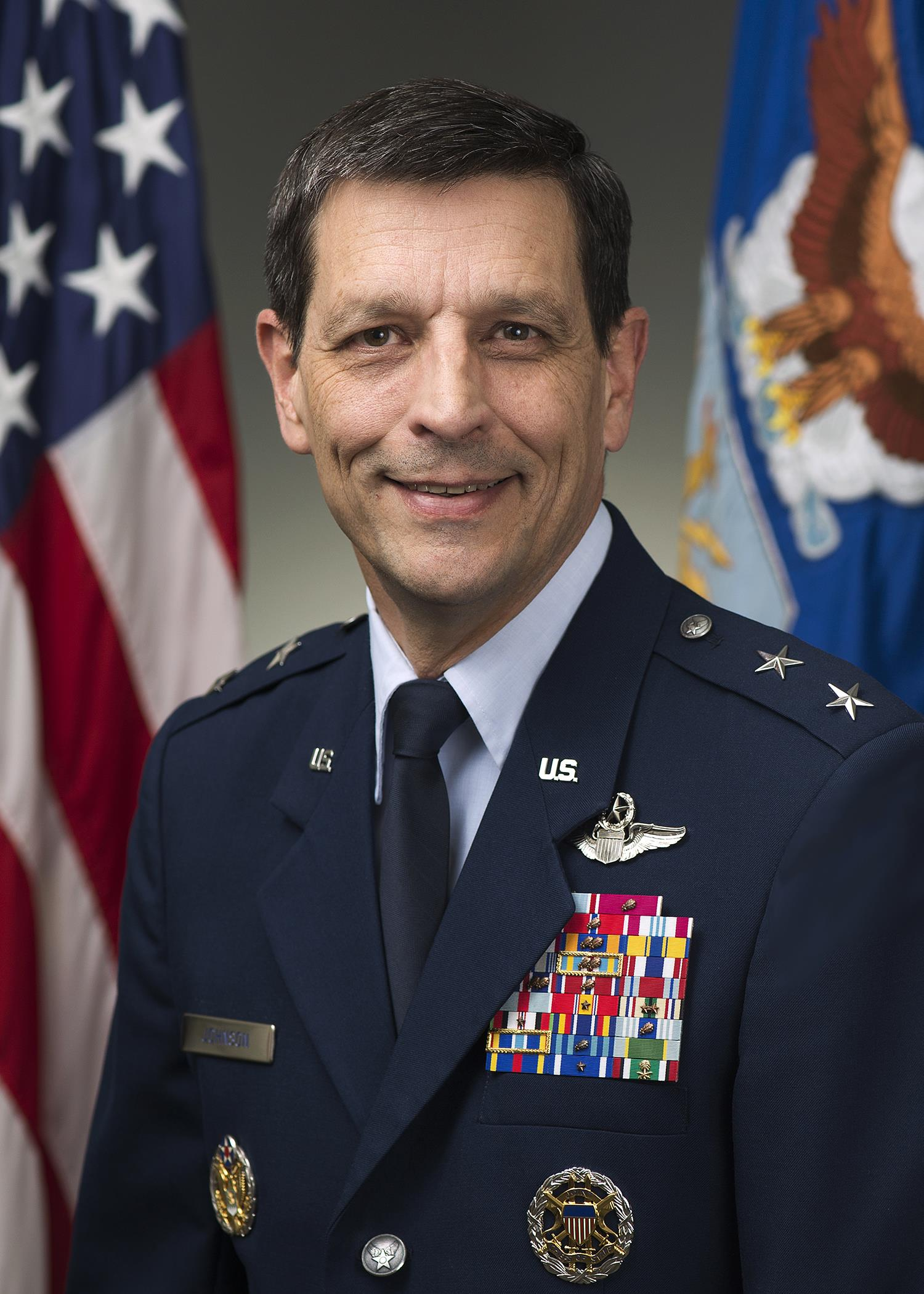
- Major General Paul T. Johnson in 2016
- Born: April 26, 1958 (age 68); Gadsden, Alabama
- Military career
- Allegiance: United States
- Branch: United States Air Force
- Service years: 1985–2016
- Rank: Major General
- Commands: 451st Air Expeditionary Group (2010–11); 355th Fighter Wing (2008–10); 354th Operations Group (2004–06); 75th Fighter Squadron (2000–02)
- Conflicts: Gulf War; Operation Northern Watch; War in Afghanistan
- Awards: Air Force Cross; Defense Superior Service Medal; Legion of Merit (2); Distinguished Flying Cross; Bronze Star Medal (2)

Paul T. Johnson (born April 26, 1958) is a retired major general in the United States Air Force. He was commander of the 355th Fighter Wing and 451st Air Expeditionary Wing, and has served in Operation Desert Storm, Operation Northern Watch, and Operation Enduring Freedom. He was commissioned as a 2nd lieutenant in May 1985. He received the Air Force Cross for rescuing a stranded U.S. Navy pilot, Lieutenant Devon Jones, in the Gulf War.

== Air Force Cross ==
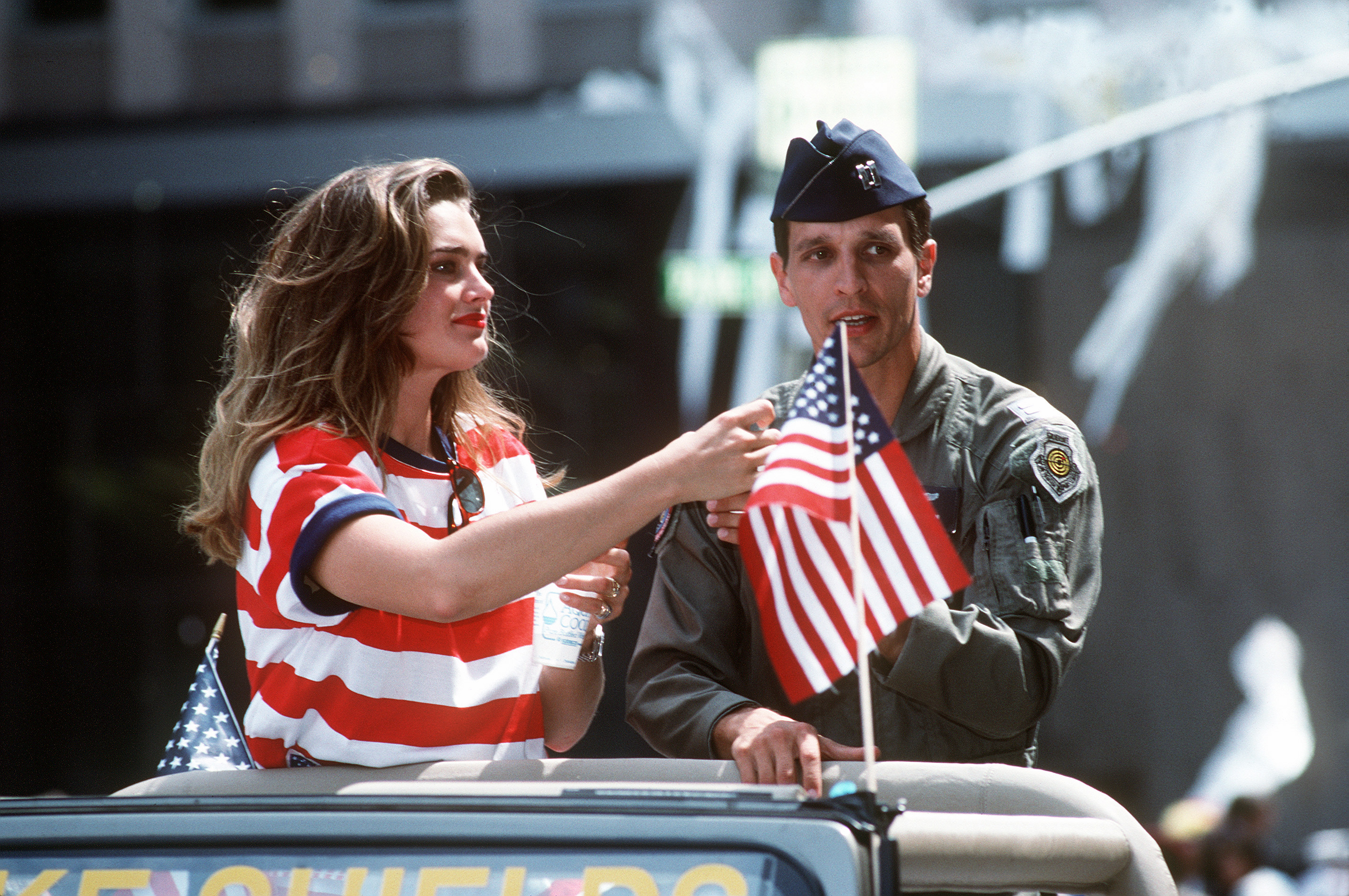
Brooke Shields and Air Force Capt. Paul Johnson in 1991

His citation reads:

The President of the United States of America, authorized by Title 10, Section 8742, United States Code, takes pleasure in presenting the Air Force Cross to Captain Paul T. Johnson, United States Air Force, for extraordinary heroism in military operations against an opposing armed force while serving as an A-10 Pilot with the 354th Tactical Fighter Wing, during Operation DESERT STORM on 21 January 1991. On that date, Captain Johnson was the flight lead on Sandy 57, a two-ship of A-10s tasked for search and rescue alert at a forward operating location. While en route, he received tasking to look for an F-14 crew that had been shot down the night before. During the next six hours he would lead his flight through three aerial refuelings, one attack on a possible SCUD missile site, and three hours of intensive searching deeper inside enemy territory than any A-10 had ever been. He risked his life as he had to fly at a mere 500 feet in order to pinpoint the survivor's location. When an enemy truck appeared to be heading toward his survivor, Captain Johnson directed his flight to destroy it, thus securing the rescue. It was his superior airmanship and his masterful techniques at orchestration that made this rescue happen – the first in the history of the A-10 weapons system. Through his extraordinary heroism, superb airmanship, and aggressiveness in the face of the enemy, Captain Johnson reflected the highest credit upon himself and the United States Air Force.
