= Pilots in Pajamas =

1968 East German documentary

- Written by: Walter Heynowski
- Directed by: Walter Heynowski; Gerhard Scheumann
- Composer: Reiner Bredemeyer
- Country of origin: East Germany
- Original language: German
- No. of episodes: 4

Production
- Running time: 294 minutes
- Production company: DEFA

Original release
- Network: Deutscher Fernsehfunk
- Release: April 17 – April 23, 1968

Pilots in Pajamas (German: Piloten im Pyjama) is a 1968 East German documentary film directed by Walter Heynowski and Gerhard Scheumann, produced by DEFA, and aired in four parts in April 1968 on Deutscher Fernsehfunk.

== Synopsis ==
The film features interviews with ten United States Air Force and Navy pilots shot down over North Vietnam in Operation Rolling Thunder and held as prisoners of war at Hỏa Lò Prison: Edward L. Hubbard, Everett Alvarez Jr., James Richard Shively, Herbert Benjamin Ringsdorf, Loren Harvey Torkelson, Robert R. Abbott, David Henry Duart, Leo Keith Thorsness, James Lindbergh Hughes, and Robinson Risner. Over the course of the interviews, the pilots are asked questions about their background and training, their experiences of being shot down and living as prisoners of war, and their thoughts on responsibility for the suffering caused by American bombing campaigns in Vietnam.

The documentary concludes with many of the pilots stating that they oppose the American presence in Vietnam and hoping the election of a new American president in 1968 will lead to their release. The prisoners were not released until 1973 after the Paris Peace Accords.

== Episodes ==
No.	Title	Original release date
1	"Yes, Sir"	17 April 1968
2	"Hanoi Hilton" (German: Hanoi-Hilton)	19 April 1968
3	"All in a Day's Work" (German: Der Job)	21 April 1968
4	"The Phantoms and the Thunderchiefs" (German: Die Donnergötter)	23 April 1968

== Authenticity ==
In his autobiography, The Passing of the Night: My Seven Years as a Prisoner of the North Vietnamese, Robinson Risner claims he was ordered by the North Vietnamese to participate in the film and given a script of both questions and answers.

Accusations of coercion were commonly levelled against Heynowski and Scheumann in the U.S. and European press. While West German magazine Stern published an interview with Heynowski and Scheumann, the text accompanying their still photographs was removed, and the interview ran alongside an editorial that began: "It is well-known that not all liars are Communists and, alternatively, it cannot be ruled out that a Communist can tell the truth". Stern had been denied permission by the North Vietnamese government to interview the same pilots.

== Reception ==
The film generated substantial interest both domestically and abroad. An English-narrated version of the film with the pilots' original speech (as opposed to a German dub) was produced and later sold to American broadcasting company NBC, but was never aired.
