= James H. Kasler =

US Air Force officer and only three time recipient of the Air Force Cross

James Helms Kasler
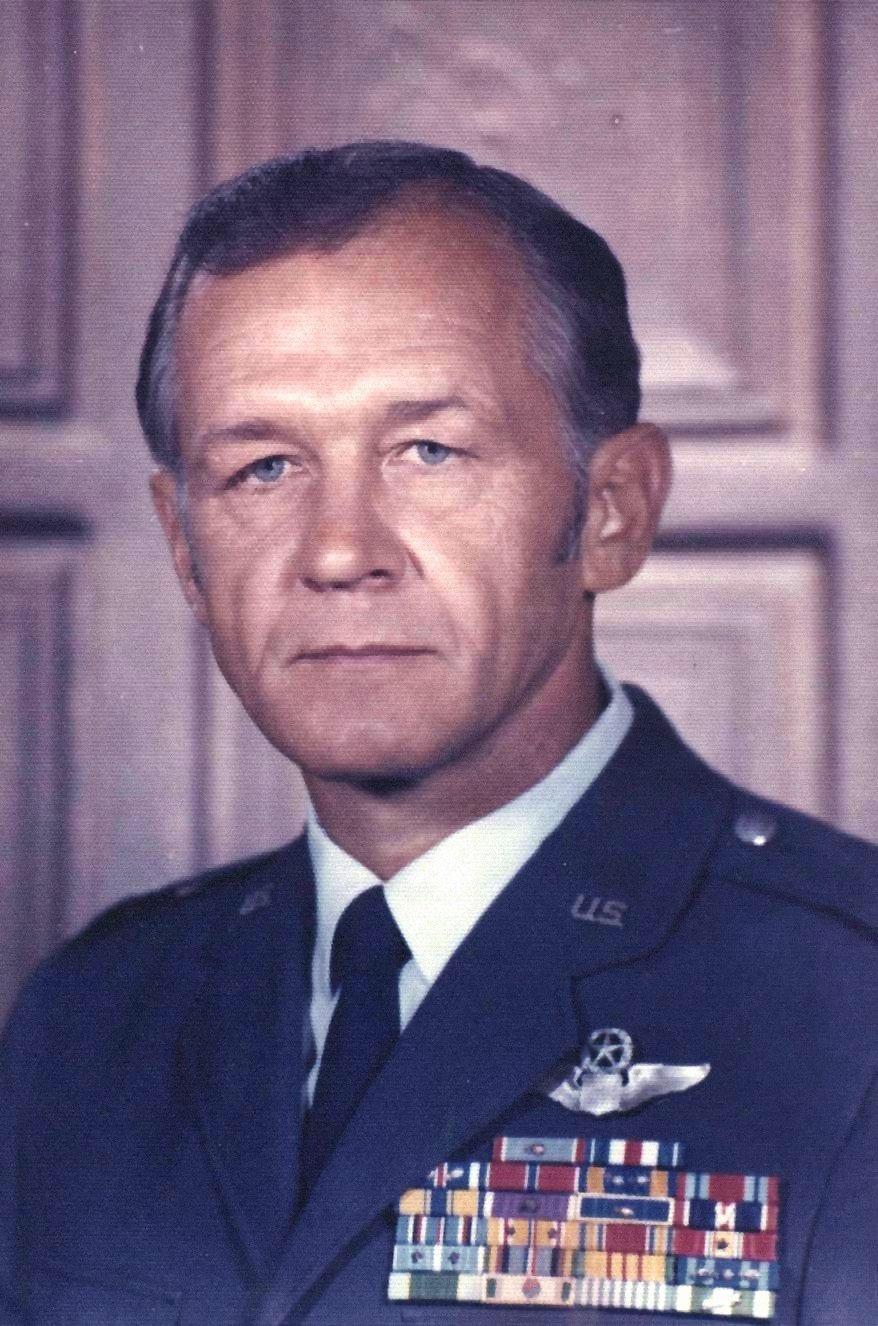
- Born: May 2, 1926; South Bend, Indiana, US
- Died: April 24, 2014 (aged 87); West Palm Beach, Florida, US
- Burial place: Crown Hill Cemetery
- Military career
- Allegiance: United States
- Branch: United States Air Force
- Service years: 1943–1975 (32 years)
- Rank: Colonel
- Nicknames: Jim; Destroyer; Stoneface
- Service number: O-2221728
- Units: 4th Fighter Interceptor Wing; 355th Tactical Fighter Wing
- Commands: 366th Tactical Fighter Wing
- Conflicts: World War II; Korean War; Vietnam War
- Awards: Air Force Cross (3); Silver Star (2); Legion of Merit; Distinguished Flying Cross (9); Bronze Star Medal (2); Purple Heart (2); Air Medal (11)

Colonel James Helms Kasler (May 2, 1926 – April 24, 2014) was a United States Air Force officer and fighter pilot who fought in World War II, the Korean War and the Vietnam War. He is the only person to have been awarded the Air Force Cross three times, the highest award for valor in combat that an airman can receive below the Medal of Honor.

Kasler flew combat missions over Japan as a B-29 tail gunner in 1945 and became a jet ace in Korea, where he was credited with destroying six MiG-15s while flying the F-86 Sabre. In 1966, he flew the F-105 Thunderchief from Thailand and led the June 29 strike on the petroleum storage complex at Hanoi, for which he received his first Air Force Cross. He was shot down on August 8, 1966, while protecting a downed wingman and spent 2,401 days as a prisoner of war in North Vietnam, where his captors tortured him many times because he would not take part in their propaganda. After his release in 1973, he served as vice commander of the 366th Tactical Fighter Wing and retired from the Air Force in 1975.

== Early life and education ==
Kasler was born on May 2, 1926, in South Bend, Indiana. He grew up in Indianapolis and graduated from Shortridge High School. After World War II, he attended Butler University, played semiprofessional football and married Martha Lee Rankin. He later earned a bachelor's degree from the University of Omaha in June 1963.

== Military career ==
=== World War II ===
Kasler enlisted in the Army Reserve on November 24, 1943, and entered active duty with the Army Air Forces on May 16, 1944. From June 1945 to May 1946, he served as a B-29 Superfortress tail gunner with the 5th Bomb Squadron of the 9th Bomb Group on Tinian, where he flew seven missions over Japan. He left active duty on May 21, 1946, and joined the reserve.

=== Post war ===
Kasler entered the Air Force's aviation cadet program on February 28, 1950, and received his pilot wings and his commission as a second lieutenant on March 24, 1951. He trained at Williams Air Force Base, Arizona, and completed gunnery training at Luke Air Force Base. After combat crew training in the F-84 Thunderjet, he flew the F-86 Sabre with the 74th Fighter-Interceptor Squadron at Presque Isle Air Force Base, Maine, from July to November 1951.

=== Korean War ===
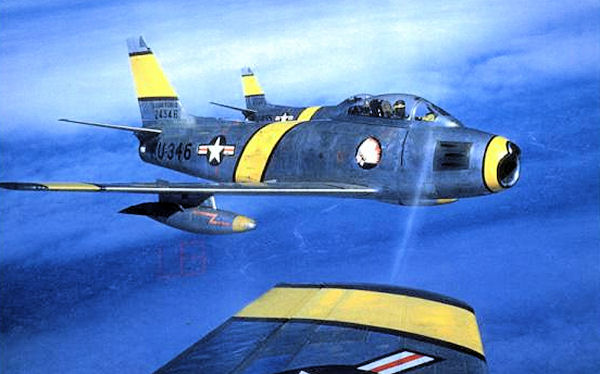
335th FIS F-86Fs over North Korea

In November 1951, Kasler joined the 335th Fighter-Interceptor Squadron of the 4th Fighter-Interceptor Wing at Kimpo Air Base in South Korea during the Korean War, where the wing was commanded by Colonel Harrison Thyng. Flying the F-86E in the area of northwestern Korea known as "MiG Alley", he scored his first aerial victory on April 1, 1952. On April 21, 1952, he was leading a pair of Sabres guarding fighter-bombers when he intercepted four MiG-15s bound for the strike area. He downed the lead MiG and then scattered the other three by turning into them head-on, an action that earned him the Distinguished Flying Cross.

On May 15, 1952, Kasler engaged a group of three MiG-15s. He closed to within roughly 100 feet (30 m) of one and left it burning, then talked his wingman into a firing position from which the wingman shot down a second. Kasler followed the last MiG for some 50 miles (80 km) at very low altitude, under fire from the ground, and destroyed it, and the Silver Star he received for the fight credited the two Americans with the entire formation. These were Kasler's fourth and fifth victories, made in one engagement near the Yalu River. By the end of his tour in June 1952, he had been credited with six MiG-15s destroyed and two damaged in 101 combat missions. He was the Air Force's fifteenth jet ace, and he also received three Distinguished Flying Crosses for his service in Korea. The novelist James Salter later wrote that he regarded Kasler as a fighter pilot without equal.

=== Between the wars ===
Kasler returned to the United States in August 1952 as a fighter gunnery instructor with the 3594th Fighter Training Squadron at Nellis Air Force Base, Nevada. From July 1954 to July 1955, he was a research and development pilot with the 3525th Aircraft Gunnery Squadron at Nellis. He then spent two years as an instructor pilot on exchange with the Royal Canadian Air Force, assigned to its Central Co-ordinating Staff in Ottawa. During this tour, he flew Canadian-built Sabres with No. 1 Overseas Training Unit at RCAF Station Chatham, New Brunswick.

From September 1957 to February 1959, Kasler flew the F-100 Super Sabre with the 308th Fighter-Bomber Squadron at Turner Air Force Base, Georgia. He transitioned to the F-105 Thunderchief with the 334th Tactical Fighter Squadron at Seymour Johnson Air Force Base, North Carolina, where he served from February 1959 to November 1962. After completing his degree in Omaha, he flew the F-105 with the 53rd Tactical Fighter Squadron and served on the staff of the 36th Tactical Fighter Wing at Bitburg Air Base, West Germany, from July 1963 to February 1966. Before his Vietnam tour, he had served for 14 years with fighter units in North America and Europe and had accumulated over 4,000 flying hours in fighter aircraft.

=== Vietnam War ===
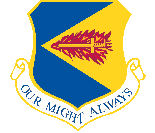
Emblem of the 355th Tactical Fighter Wing

In February 1966, Kasler went to the Vietnam War with the 354th Tactical Fighter Squadron of the 355th Tactical Fighter Wing at Takhli Royal Thai Air Force Base, Thailand. He was the squadron's assistant operations officer before taking over as operations officer, and his work in shaping and spreading the tactics used by fighter-bombers in the campaign earned him the Bronze Star Medal. On April 26, 1966, he served as deputy mission commander for a low-level night attack on the arsenal at Yên Bái, in which he located the target by radar and made his run on his own through mountains and intense antiaircraft fire. On June 2, he took his flight through bad weather to a strongly defended road bridge at Thái Nguyên. Ground fire struck his F-105 as he attacked, but the two 3,000-pound (1,400 kg) bombs he dropped hit the middle span and put the bridge out of action.

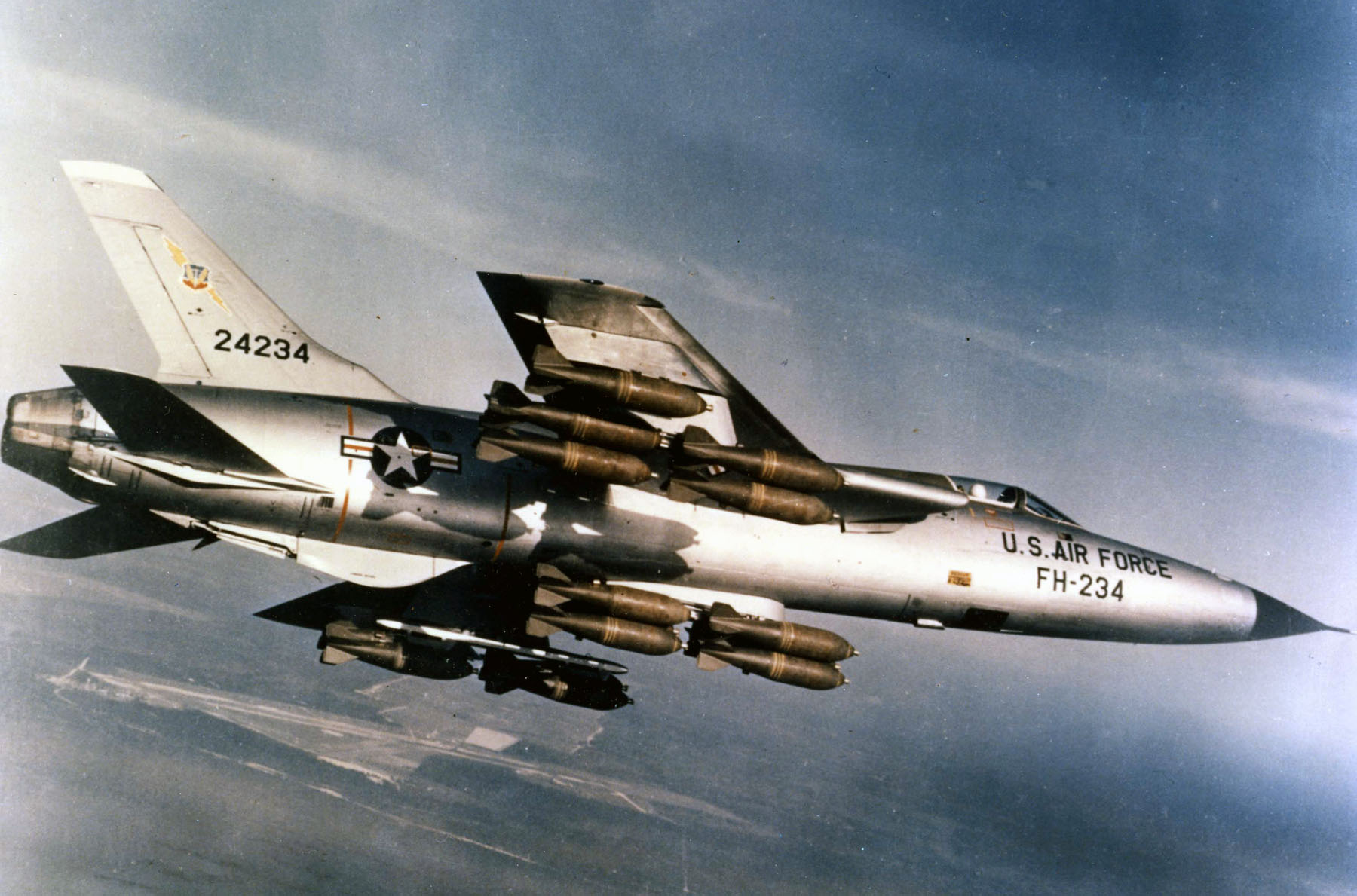
A 355th Tactical Fighter Wing F-105D in flight with a full load of 750 lb bombs

On June 29, 1966, Kasler commanded the second wave, the largest of the attacking formations, in the first raid on the petroleum storage complex at Hanoi. His formation bombed precisely on target and set off an enormous fire, and on the way out he hunted for vehicles and destroyed five trucks before he ran short of fuel. The Associated Press later reported that the raid wiped out roughly nine-tenths of the complex, and other pilots began calling him "the Destroyer". He received his first Air Force Cross for the mission.

Kasler earned several more Distinguished Flying Crosses for missions over North Vietnam in July 1966. On July 3, after bringing his flight through thick cloud to scout the Red River valley, he wrecked three trains and the rail yard at Phú Thọ and then knocked out four trucks from a convoy. On July 11, his flight came in at treetop height and dropped a well-defended rail bridge at Cao Nung on North Vietnam's northeast railroad. A week later, he struck the Suoi Co rail bridge near Kép, on the route linking Hanoi with China, and then strafed and destroyed three trains carrying supplies. Time magazine reported that he was on his way to becoming the best-known American flying over North Vietnam and that fellow airmen called him a "one-man Air Force".

On August 8, 1966, on his 91st combat mission, Kasler led a four-aircraft flight of F-105s against warehouses about 55 miles (89 km) northwest of Hanoi to evaluate a low-level delivery tactic. Having bombed the warehouses, the four aircraft went after trucks they spotted in the area, and antiaircraft fire brought down his wingman 1st Lt. Frederick Flom, who bailed out. Kasler circled overhead to protect Flom until his fuel ran low, took on more from a KC-135 tanker and flew back to coordinate the rescue attempt. As he searched for his wingman at very low altitude, Kasler was himself hit by ground fire, and he abandoned his F-105D (serial number 62-4343) about 10 miles (16 km) southeast of Yên Bái. A brief call on his survival radio said that he had broken his leg. Close to 50 aircraft joined an eight-hour search that failed to find him, and North Vietnam later announced that he had been captured. Flom was also captured and remained a prisoner until March 4, 1973. He received a second Air Force Cross for his conduct on this mission, although the citation gives the date of the action as August 6, 1966.

=== Prisoner of war ===
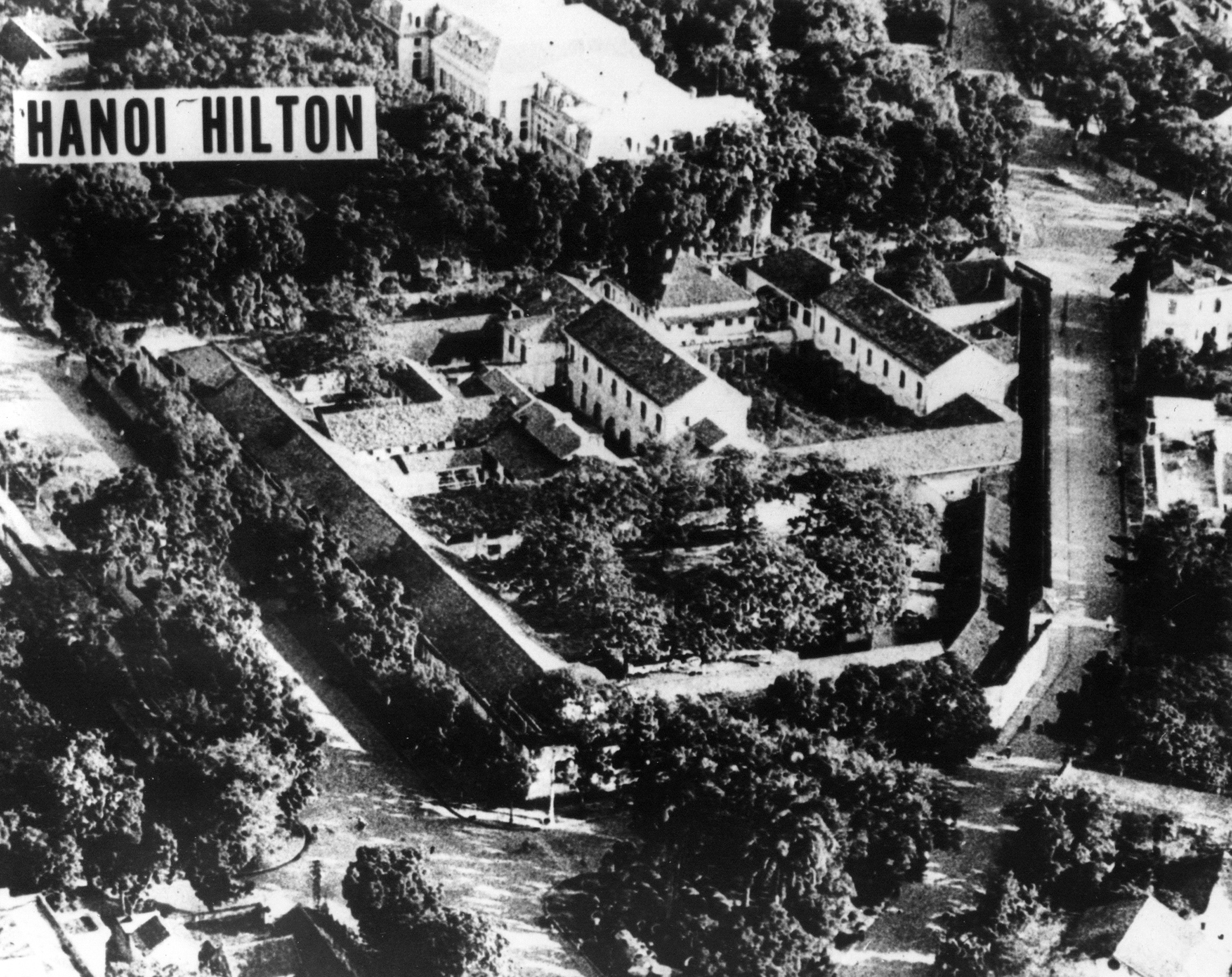
Hỏa Lò Prison, the "Hanoi Hilton"

During his first three and a half years as a prisoner, Kasler was tortured on dozens of occasions. Between August 15 and September 20, 1967, while his captors were hunting for the men who organized resistance among the prisoners, he was tortured with barely a pause. His arms were restrained behind him for the whole period, and repeated sessions in ropes left him badly hurt. He also suffered from osteomyelitis, a bone infection that set in in his right leg early in 1967 and was not operated on until January 1969.

In mid-1968, he refused demands that he meet antiwar visitors from abroad and appear on camera for North Vietnamese propaganda. In his own account, published in the 1977 collection We Came Home, Kasler described six weeks of torture that began in late June 1968, when his captors wanted him to take part in an event marking what they claimed was the 3,000th American aircraft downed over the North. He recalled being put in ropes and irons ten times and kept awake for five days, during three of which he was beaten with a fan belt at hourly intervals, while being given almost no food throughout. His injuries included a beating to the face so severe that he could not open his jaw for five days, a ruptured eardrum, a broken rib and the displacement of the metal pin in his damaged leg, which was forced up toward his hip. John G. Hubbell's 1976 history P.O.W., which Representative Ileana Ros-Lehtinen cited at a 1999 House hearing, relates that on July 3, 1968, at the prison camp the Americans knew as the Zoo, a Cuban interrogator whom the prisoners called Fidel drove a boot heel into Kasler's chest and had him bound by the thumbs and elbows. The same account says that Kasler received 36 lashes, which tore open the skin of his lower back and legs, but that he still did not submit. His third Air Force Cross, awarded to him as a lieutenant colonel, recognized his resistance during this period and his refusal to provide the statements his captors sought.

Later in his captivity, Kasler shared Room 7 of the Hanoi Hilton with fellow prisoners including Robinson Risner, James Stockdale, Bud Day, John McCain and Jeremiah Denton. He never cooperated with his captors. He later said that the prisoners' aim had been to come home with their honor intact. He was released on March 4, 1973, during Operation Homecoming, after 2,401 days as a prisoner, and he was briefly hospitalized at Wright-Patterson Air Force Base, Ohio. On his return to Indianapolis on March 8, 1973, he discovered that hundreds of POW bracelets had been left at his family's door, and the city honored him with a parade. He also led the 500 Festival Parade that year as its grand marshal.

=== Post-release ===
Kasler attended the Air War College at Maxwell Air Force Base, Alabama, from August 1973 to July 1974. In August 1974, he became an F-111 pilot and vice commander of the 366th Tactical Fighter Wing at Mountain Home Air Force Base, Idaho. He retired from the Air Force as a colonel on May 1, 1975, after 31 years of service in three wars.

== Later life and death ==
Kasler lived for the last 39 years of his life in Momence, Illinois, where he owned the South Shore Golf Course. He and Martha bought and redeveloped the course, which is in Kankakee County. His biography, Tempered Steel: The Three Wars of Triple Air Force Cross Winner Jim Kasler by Perry D. Luckett and Charles L. Byler, was published by Potomac Books in 2005 with a foreword by Salter. He was also featured in the History Channel series Dogfights.

On September 15, 2007, Momence dedicated the Kasler-Momence Veterans Park, which includes a statue of Kasler, in a ceremony attended by more than 300 people. Four Air Force Reserve Command F-16s flew over the ceremony. The Air Command and Staff College honored him at its Gathering of Eagles in 1993 and again in 2012. In September 2011, Wright-Patterson Air Force Base held a series of "Tribute to Honor" events recognizing Kasler and his wife.

Kasler died on April 24, 2014, in West Palm Beach, Florida, at the age of 87. A memorial service was held on May 4, 2014, at Olivet Nazarene University. He was buried with full military honors at Crown Hill Cemetery in Indianapolis on May 16, 2014, with honor guard from Scott Air Force Base firing a 21-gun salute.

== Awards and decorations ==
Included among his 76 awards for valor and service, in addition to receiving three awards of the Air Force Cross, Kasler was decorated twice with the Silver Star and awarded a Legion of Merit, nine Distinguished Flying Crosses, two Bronze Star Medals, two Purple Hearts, and eleven Air Medals.

US Air Force Command Pilot Badge
Air Force Cross w/ 2 bronze oak leaf clusters
Silver Star w/ 1 bronze oak leaf cluster	Legion of Merit	Distinguished Flying Cross w/ Valor device, 1 silver and 2 bronze oak leaf clusters
Distinguished Flying Cross (second ribbon required for accouterment spacing)	Bronze Star w/ Valor device and 1 bronze oak leaf cluster	Purple Heart w/ 1 bronze oak leaf cluster
Air Medal w/ 2 silver oak leaf clusters	Air Force Commendation Medal w/ 2 bronze oak leaf clusters	Air Force Presidential Unit Citation w/ 2 bronze oak leaf clusters
Air Force Outstanding Unit Award w/ Valor device and 2 bronze oak leaf clusters	Prisoner of War Medal	Combat Readiness Medal
Army Good Conduct Medal	American Campaign Medal	Asiatic-Pacific Campaign Medal w/ 2 bronze campaign stars
World War II Victory Medal	National Defense Service Medal w/ 1 bronze service star	Korean Service Medal w/ 2 bronze campaign stars
Armed Forces Expeditionary Medal	Vietnam Service Medal w/ 3 silver and 1 bronze campaign stars	Air Force Longevity Service Award w/ 1 silver and 2 bronze oak leaf clusters
Small Arms Expert Marksmanship Ribbon	Republic of Korea Presidential Unit Citation	Republic of Vietnam Gallantry Cross
United Nations Service Medal for Korea	Vietnam Campaign Medal	Korean War Service Medal

=== Air Force Cross citation (1st Award) ===

Kasler, James Helms
Major, U.S. Air Force
354th Tactical Fighter Squadron, 355th Tactical Fighter Wing, Takhli Royal Thai Air Base, Thailand
Date of Action: June 29, 1966

Citation:

The President of the United States of America, authorized by Title 10, Section 8742, United States Code, takes pleasure in presenting the Air Force Cross to Major James Helms Kasler, United States Air Force, for extraordinary heroism in connection with military operations against an opposing armed force as Pilot of an F-105 Thunderchief with the 354th Tactical Fighter Squadron, 355th Tactical Fighter Wing, Takhli Royal Thai Air Base, Thailand, in action over Hanoi, North Vietnam, on 29 June 1966. On that date, Major Kasler was Mission Commander of the second and largest wave of fighter-bombers to strike the heavily defended Hanoi petroleum products storage complex. Despite a seemingly impenetrable canopy of bursting projectiles thrown up by hostile defenses of this key facility, Major Kasler determinedly and precisely led his striking force to the exact release point where he and his followers placed their ordnance directly on target, causing it to erupt in a huge fireball of burning petroleum. Performing armed reconnaissance during his withdrawal, Major Kasler, with total disregard for his personal safety, personally destroyed five trucks before low fuel reserves forced him to terminate his attack. Through his extraordinary heroism superb airmanship, and aggressiveness in the face of hostile forces, Major Kasler reflected the highest credit upon himself and the United States Air Force.

=== Air Force Cross citation (2nd Award) ===

Kasler, James Helms
Major, U.S. Air Force
354th Tactical Fighter Squadron, 355th Tactical Fighter Wing, Takhli Royal Thai Air Base, Thailand
Date of Action: August 6, 1966

Citation:

The President of the United States of America, authorized by Title 10, Section 8742, United States Code, takes pleasure in presenting a Bronze Oak Leaf Cluster in lieu of a Second Award of the Air Force Cross to Major James Helms Kasler, United States Air Force, for extraordinary heroism in connection with military operations against an opposing armed force as an F-105 Thunderchief pilot with the 354th Tactical Fighter Squadron, 355th Tactical Fighter Wing, Takhli Royal Thai Air Base, Thailand, in action near Yen Bay, North Vietnam, on 6 August 1966. On that date, Major Kasler led a flight of fighter-bombers against a heavily defended target in evaluating a low level ordnance delivery tactic. While carrying out this hazardous mission, a wingman was forced to eject over unfriendly territory. Major Kasler located the downed airman and flew cover until perilously low fuel compelled him to leave. Refueling aerially, Major Kasler returned to relocate the downed pilot so he could direct rescue operations. At great risk to his own life, he explored the gun infested countryside at tree-top level, valiantly searching, but was unable to locate his fellow American. Major Kasler's Thunderchief was hit by destructive ground fire during his valorous search, and he too ejected into unfriendly hands. Through his extraordinary heroism superb airmanship, and aggressiveness in the face of hostile forces, Major Kasler reflected the highest credit upon himself and the United States Air Force.

=== Air Force Cross citation (3rd Award) ===

Kasler, James Helms
Lieutenant Colonel, U.S. Air Force
Prisoner of War, North Vietnam
Date of Action: June 1968 to July 1968

Citation:

The President of the United States of America, authorized by Title 10, Section 8742, United States Code, takes pleasure in presenting a Second Bronze Oak Leaf Cluster in lieu of a Third Award of the Air Force Cross to Lieutenant Colonel James Helms Kasler, United States Air Force, for extraordinary heroism in military operations against an opposing armed force while a Prisoner of War in North Vietnam from June 1968 through July 1968. During this period, Colonel Kasler accomplished an amazing feat of resistance against the North Vietnamese when they attempted to force him to meet a visiting delegation and appear before television and news cameras. Through personal fortitude and absolute heroism, he completely withstood the most brutal of Vietnamese tortures and caused his captors extreme embarrassment in their failure to gain useful propaganda statements. Through extraordinary heroism, staunch display of courage, and willpower in the face of the enemy, Colonel Kasler reflected the highest credit on himself and the United States Air Force.

== See also ==
- List of Korean War flying aces
