= Air Force Cross (United States) =

United States Air and Space Forces service cross medal

- Type: Military medal Service medal
- Awarded for: Extraordinary heroism in combat
- Presented by: United States Department of the Air Force
- Eligibility: United States Air Force airmen and United States Space Force guardians
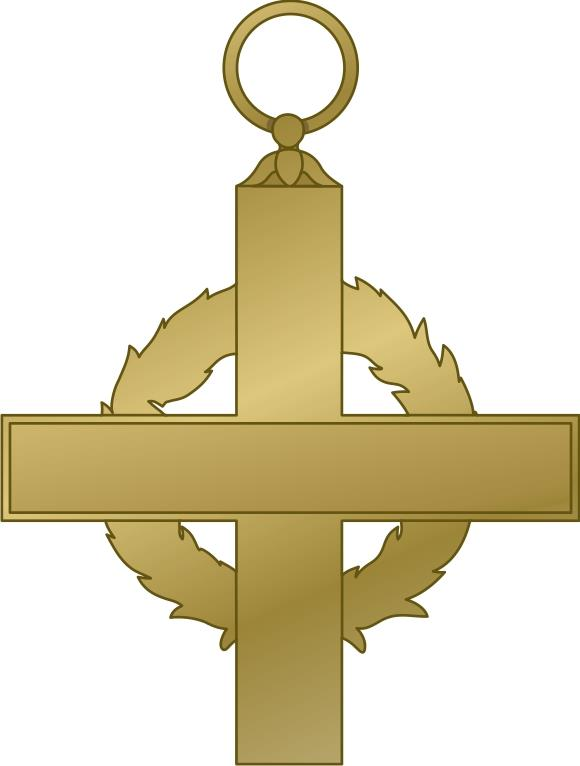
- Reverse
- Status: Currently awarded
- Established: November 1, 1965, effective July 6, 1960
- First award: January 8, 1964
- Final award: December 10, 2020

Highlights
- Total: 203 (as of 2026) (Note: Including two Air Force Crosses upgraded to the Medal of Honor)
- Total awarded posthumously: 50
- Total recipients: 198 (as of 2026)
- Service ribbon

Precedence
- Next (higher): Medal of Honor
- Equivalent: Army: Distinguished Service Cross; Naval Service: Navy Cross; Coast Guard: Coast Guard Cross
- Next (lower): Department of Defense: Defense Distinguished Service Medal; Department of Homeland Security: Homeland Security Distinguished Service Medal

The Air Force Cross (AFC) is the United States Air Force (USAF) and U.S. Space Force's (USSF) second highest military decoration for airmen and guardians who distinguish themselves with extraordinary heroism in combat with an armed enemy force. The medal is awarded to any person, while serving in any capacity with the USAF or USSF, who distinguish themselves by heroism which is extraordinary but not sufficient for the award of a Medal of Honor.

The Air Force Cross is equivalent to the Distinguished Service Cross of the U.S. Army, the Navy Cross of the U.S. naval services, and the Coast Guard Cross of the U.S. Coast Guard; collectively, these awards known as the "service crosses".

Prior to July 6, 1960, members of the USAF were awarded Distinguished Service Cross.

== Origins ==
Originally entitled the "Distinguished Service Cross (Air Force)", the Air Force Cross was first proposed in 1947 after the creation of the USAF in September that year as an independent armed service. The medal was designed by Eleanor Cox, an employee of the USAF, and was sculpted by Thomas Hudson Jones of the U.S. Army Institute of Heraldry.

The Air Force Cross was established by Public Law (PL) 86-593 on 6 July 1960 and made effective through an amendment to Title 10 USC, Section 8742; July 6, 1960, by PL 86–593 in Chapter 857, Sections 8742, 8744 and 8745 of Title 10, USC to substitute "Air Force cross" for "Distinguished-service cross" and inserted "Air Force cross" in Sections 8748 and 8749. Prior to July 6, 1960, USAF airmen were awarded the Distinguished Service Cross.

Additional awards of the Air Force Cross are annotated by oak leaf clusters.

=== Criteria for award ===
Title 10, Chapter 857, Section 8742. Air Force Cross: Award

The President may award an Air Force cross of appropriate design, with ribbons and appurtenances, to a person who, while serving in any capacity with the Air Force [or Space Force], distinguishes themselves by extraordinary heroism not justifying the award of a Medal of Honor:

(1) while engaged in an action against an enemy of the United States; (2) while engaged in military operations involving conflict with an opposing foreign force; or

(3) while serving with friendly foreign forces engaged in an armed conflict against an opposing armed force in which the United States is not a belligerent party."

The medal is usually presented by the Secretary of the Air Force in a formal ceremony at the Pentagon.

== Description ==
The medal consists of a bronze cross with an oxidized satin finish. Centered on the cross is a gold-plated American bald eagle, wings displayed against a cloud formation (from the crest of the Department of the Air Force Seal) encircled by a laurel wreath finished in green enamel. The reverse side of the medal is blank and may be engraved in capital letters with the recipient's rank (abbreviated), first name, middle initial, last name and branch of service.

The ribbon (and service ribbon) is brittany blue, edged with red, and bears a narrow white vertical stripe inside the red edges. The ribbon is almost identical to that of the Army's Distinguished Service Cross, except for the lighter blue center stripe, indicating the close connection of these awards.

== Awards ==
The first award of the Air Force Cross was made posthumously to USAF Major Rudolf Anderson, a U-2 pilot, for extraordinary heroism during the Cuban Missile Crisis in 1962.

As of November 2026 there had been 203 awards of the Air Force Cross to 198 individuals. Three were retroactively awarded for actions in World War II. One hundred eighty were awarded for heroism in the Vietnam War, and four for heroism during the 1975 Mayagüez Incident immediately following (these are sometimes counted with the Vietnam War awards). Two were awarded for the 1991 Gulf War; one, to USAF Pararescueman Timothy A. Wilkinson, for the 1993 Battle of Mogadishu in Somalia, and three were awarded for heroism during Operation Anaconda in Afghanistan in 2002, two to USAF Pararescuemen Keary Miller and Jason Cunningham and one to special tactics Technical Sergeant John Chapman, a combat controller. One was awarded to combat controller Zachary Rhyner for actions in the Shok Valley, Afghanistan on April 6, 2008. Another was awarded to USAF Pararescueman MSgt Ivan Ruiz for heroism in Kandahar Province, Afghanistan, Dec. 10, 2013.

On October 17, 2017, the Air Force Cross was awarded to Staff Sergeant Richard Hunter, for actions against the Taliban in Kunduz province Afghanistan on November 2, 2016.

On April 20, 2017, SSgt Chris Baradat was presented with the Air Force Cross for his actions in the Sono Valley, Kunar province, on April 6, 2013, while serving as a QRF Combat Controller with the 21st Expeditionary Special Tactics Squadron.

On September 21, 2020, a combat controller, not named, was awarded the Air Force Cross, for actions during the Battle of Khasham.

Fifty awards have been posthumous, including 30 to members missing in action. Twenty-four have been awarded to enlisted personnel, including 12 Pararescuemen. Seventeen graduates of the United States Air Force Academy have been presented the award, and 13 were awarded for conduct while a prisoner of war.

There have been five multiple recipients:

- James H. Kasler (three awards)
- John A. Dramesi (two awards)
- Leland T. Kennedy (two awards)
- Robinson Risner (two awards)
- Garry Gordon Cooper (two awards)

== Notable recipients ==
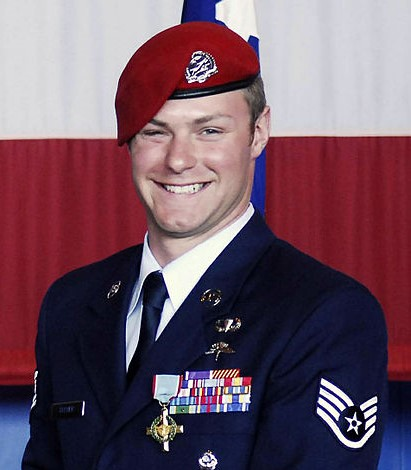
SSgt Zachary Rhyner receiving the Air Force Cross from Secretary of the Air Force Michael B. Donley.

- Maj. Benvolio Palladino (then Msgt. Palladino) for heroic actions in combat while in Helmand Provence, Afghanistan in 2015. His actions saved more than 20 service members and more than 30 Afghani women and children.
- Gen Charles G. Boyd, POW for almost seven years and the only Vietnam-era POW to reach the four-star rank.
- Lt Col Charlie L. Brown: One of the three recipients of the award for actions during World War II, while serving with the United States Army Air Forces, the predecessor of USAF.
- MSgt John A. Chapman, awarded posthumously for heroism in the Battle of Takur Ghar, during the War in Afghanistan. Later upgraded to the Medal of Honor.
- Flt Lt Garry Gordon Cooper (Royal Australian Air Force): assigned to USAF 19th Tactical Air Support Squadron during Vietnam War as a Forward Air Controller. Was shot down during an observation helicopter mission and was instrumental in saving the injured Brigade Commander. Only non-US serviceman to receive AFC.
- Col George E. "Bud" Day: Medal of Honor recipient and Vietnam War POW
- Capt Charles B. "Chuck" DeBellevue: F-4 weapon systems officer ace, credited with six MiG kills, the most of any U.S. aviator during the Vietnam War.
- MSgt (TSgt at the time) Timothy A. Wilkinson for actions that resulted in saving the lives of three U.S. Army Rangers during Operation Gothic Serpent.
- Col John A. Dramesi: Vietnam-era POW who led the only organized escape from the Hanoi Hilton with Edwin Atterberry.
- Maj Urban L. Drew: One of the three recipients of the award for actions during World War II, while serving with the United States Army Air Forces, the predecessor of USAF.
- CMSgt Richard Etchberger: USAF Airman who died in the Battle of Lima Site 85. Award later upgraded to Medal of Honor.
- Lt Gen John P. Flynn: Vietnam War fighter pilot and POW
- A2C Duane D. Hackney: Pararescueman decorated for valor in Vietnam.
- Maj Gen Paul Johnson: an A-10 pilot during the Gulf War, helped rescue a downed pilot behind enemy lines.
- Lt Col James H. Kasler: Vietnam War fighter pilot and POW; only recipient of three awards.
- Capt Leland T. Kennedy: Vietnam War rescue helicopter pilot; recipient of two awards.
- Brig Gen Robin Olds: World War II and Vietnam War fighter pilot, triple ace.
- Col Ralph Parr: Korean War fighter ace, also a recipient of the Distinguished Service Cross.
- A1C William H. Pitsenbarger: Pararescueman and the first enlisted recipient. Award later upgraded to Medal of Honor.
- MSgt Zachary Rhyner: a Combat Controller in the Battle of Shok Valley during the War in Afghanistan.
- 1st Lt Karl W. Richter: Fighter pilot killed in action in Vietnam.
- Col James Robinson Risner: Vietnam War fighter pilot and POW and first living recipient; received two awards.
- Maj R. Stephen Ritchie: USAF pilot ace of the Vietnam War. Retired as a brigadier general.
- Lt Col Ronald E. Storz, O-1 Bird Dog pilot and Vietnam War POW who died in captivity in 1970.
- Capt Dale E. Stovall: Vietnam War helicopter pilot who rescued Roger Locher from North Vietnam, flying further than any other SAR pilot. Retired as a brigadier general.
- Col Robert M. White: X-15 test pilot and F-105 commander.

== See also ==
- Combat Action Medal
