= John A. Dramesi =

US Air Force officer, Vietnam War-era POW

John Arthur Dramesi
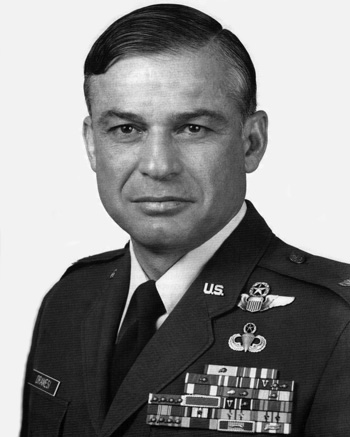
- Born: February 12, 1933; Philadelphia, Pennsylvania, U.S.
- Died: September 17, 2017 (aged 84); Pittsburgh, Pennsylvania, U.S.
- Burial place: Arlington National Cemetery
- Military career
- Allegiance: United States
- Branch: United States Air Force
- Service years: 1956–1982
- Rank: Colonel
- Units: 505th Tactical Control Group; 388th Tactical Fighter Wing
- Commands: 390th Tactical Fighter Squadron; 509th Bomb Wing
- Conflicts: Vietnam War
- Awards: Air Force Cross (2); Silver Star; Legion of Merit (2); Distinguished Flying Cross; Bronze Star (3); Purple Heart (5); Meritorious Service Medal (2); Air Medal (7)

John Arthur Dramesi (February 12, 1933 – September 17, 2017) was a United States Air Force (USAF) colonel who was held as a prisoner of war from 2 April 1967 to 4 March 1973 in both Hoa Lo Prison, known as "The Hanoi Hilton", and Cu Loc Prison, "The Zoo", during the Vietnam War.

Dramesi was the last living multiple recipient of the Air Force Cross and one of only four members of the USAF to be twice awarded the Air Force Cross. The first was for the mission on which he was shot down and captured, 2 April 1967, and the second for the six-month period following his second escape and recapture, from May to November 1969, when he was beaten and tortured. He also received an award of the Silver Star for gallantry during an escape on 10 May 1967 and the weeks following his recapture, when he also was beaten and tortured.

While other prisoners of war (POWs) were coerced into cooperating with the enemy, Dramesi steadfastly refused, declining to make propaganda recordings or write letters for the enemy.

== Early life ==
Dramesi was born in Philadelphia, Pennsylvania on 12 February 1933 and grew up in Blackwood, a neighborhood in Gloucester Township, New Jersey. He was a pugnacious wrestler at Haddonfield Memorial High School and the son of a boxer. Dramesi graduated from Rutgers University and its Air Force ROTC program in 1955, and was trained as a fighter pilot at Laredo Air Force Base. His first Air Force assignments included piloting F-100 Super Sabre and F-105 Thunderchief fighters. From June 1964 to September 1966, Dramesi served as a Forward Air Controller and Air Liaison Officer with the 4th Infantry Division at Fort Lewis, Washington.

== Vietnam War ==
Dramesi's first overseas assignment was as a Forward Air Controller flying an O-1 Bird Dog with the 505th Tactical Control Group at Tan Son Nhut AB, South Vietnam. In September 1966 he transitioned to F-105 pilot with the 13th Tactical Fighter Squadron based a Korat Royal Thai AFB, Thailand.

=== First escape ===
During his 59th bombing mission, on 2 April 1967, Dramesi was forced to eject from his crippled aircraft over North Vietnam. He twisted his knee upon landing and engaged in a gun battle with North Vietnamese soldiers. When Dramesi was captured, he'd been shot in the right leg.

On 10 April 1967, while being transported to formal prison facilities, Dramesi dismantled the side of his cell while his guards were sleeping. He was recaptured 9 miles away the following day. After being severely beaten he was transferred by truck to Hoa Lo Prison, known as "The "Hanoi Hilton", and then to "The Zoo," both in the Hanoi prison system.

=== Second escape ===
After more than a year of preparation, Dramesi's second escape took place on 10 May 1969, when he and fellow prisoner, USAF Captain Edwin Lee Atterberry, climbed through a hole in the roof of the prison. Recaptured the following day, they had traveled 3 miles in 12 hours.

Reprisals for the escape were brutal. Dramesi described being beaten, starved, injured and subjected to sleep deprivation over the next 38 days—longer than any other prisoner. Atterberry, who received similar treatment, died in captivity on 18 May 1969. The North Vietnamese guards not only tormented the two escapees, but also systematically abused the entire prison populace.

=== Operation Thunderhead and plans for a third escape ===
A result of the 1969 escape was that American officers in the prison objected to further attempts unless they could meet stringent conditions, including outside help. Planning escapes did not cease, but the actual attempts were put on hold.

Dramesi and other prisoners continued to hide food, clothing and supplies for another escape they code named "Tiger." They planned to steal a boat, move down the Red River and meet with Navy SEALs in the Gulf of Tonkin. Prison senior leadership vetoed the planned escape, fearing more harsh reprisals from their captors. Dramesi and the others on the escape committee were furious, but obeyed orders.

The Navy rescue action, called Operation Thunderhead, was cancelled after the SEALs were injured, and one killed, jumping from a helicopter in June 1972.

In February and March 1973, Dramesi was one of 591 American prisoners repatriated following the end of U.S. involvement in the Vietnam War.

=== Freedom flag ===
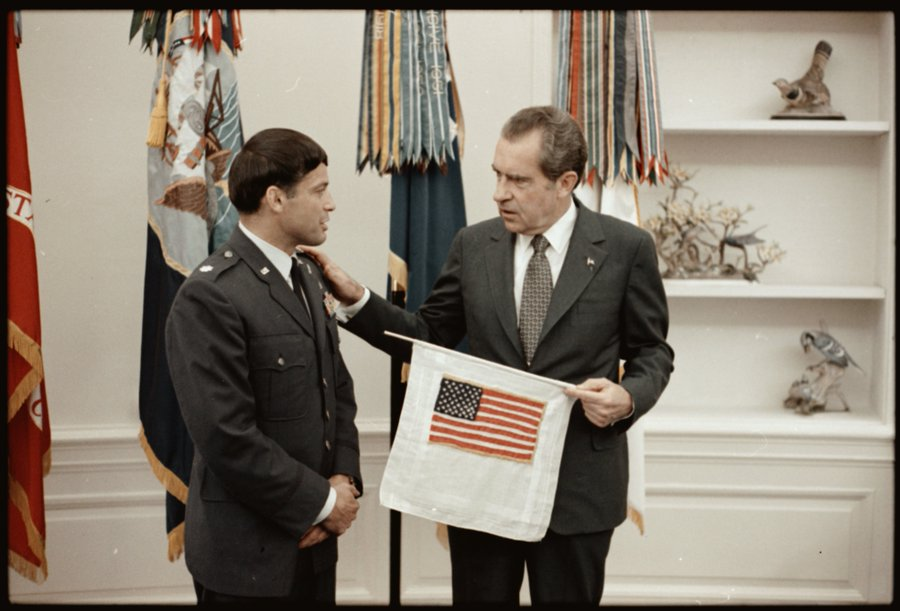

In 1971, while imprisoned, Dramesi created an American flag in secret, using scraps of cloth and thread acquired from the prison and fellow POWs. The POWs saluted this homemade flag, Stars and Stripes with gold trim embroidered on a white handkerchief, while in captivity. Upon release, press photographers shot images of Dramesi holding the flag out the window of a bus carrying POWs near Clark Air Force Base in the Philippines in March 1973.

The flag was displayed again in Washington D.C., on 24 May 1973, when the White House held a dinner for 1,300 guests including the 591 Vietnam POWs. The Honor Guard at the event presented Dramesi's flag as the band played "Stars and Stripes Forever."

Dramesi presented President Richard Nixon with the flag in the Oval Office the following day. The "Freedom Flag" is currently part of the United States National Archives and Records Administration collection, on display at the Nixon Presidential Library and Museum in Yorba Linda, California.

== Code of the U.S. Fighting Force (POW Code of Conduct) ==
Dramesi followed the Code of the U.S. Fighting Force to the letter, never cooperating more than stating his name, rank, service number and date of birth (article V of the Code) as well as resisting when possible (article II) and escaping (article III).

Dramesi's steadfast adherence to the Code necessitated a later shift in the interpretation of the articles governing the behavior of American prisoners of war. The Code was created with the understanding that captors would observe the minimum provisions of the Geneva Conventions governing POWs. Changes in The Code after Vietnam allowed military prisoners to resist "to the upmost of [their] ability," recognizing that most captives could be "broken" under the threat of extreme torture or even death.

Dramesi never broke under torture. He later criticized his fellow prisoners' conduct. John McCain, with whom he was imprisoned, would later hail Dramesi as "one of the toughest guys I've ever met."

=== Code of Honor memoir ===
In 1975, Dramesi published his memoir, entitled Code of Honor. In the book, he related his experiences as a prisoner, which included critical passages regarding the conduct of a number of his fellow POWs, and tells in detail of his escapes. The book also includes Dramesi's "Realized Word Relationships," reflections and personal definitions refined in order to better understand oneself and life's values, while imprisoned in North Vietnam for six years. Some examples:

- "A hero is one who, being master of himself, masters the situation avoided by others."
- "To be aware of time and denied freedom is man's worst torment.
- "Nationalism is the individual's transition to a greater unity."
- "Without purpose man is like an egg without its filling. Like that shell, he will crumble under the slightest pressure."
- "In death and adventure, if you go far enough, there will be light."

== Post war ==
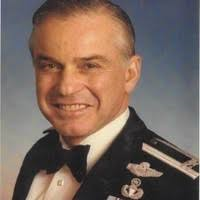
John Dramesi's USAF portrait.

After the Vietnam War, Dramesi attended the Industrial College of the Armed Forces and then went back into Air Force active duty, piloting F-111 Aardvark fighter-bombers.

Dramesi later served as the director of combat operations with Headquarters U.S. Air Forces in Europe, then the chief of the Tactical Forces Division on the staff of Headquarters U.S. Air Force at the Pentagon, and later commanded the 509th Bomb Wing at Pease AFB, New Hampshire. He retired as a colonel in 1982, as one of the most highly decorated officers in the United States Air Force.

== Later life ==
In 1982, Dramesi ran as a Republican for the Congressional seat held by James Florio, and switched parties in 1990 to run in the Democratic primary to fill Florio's then-vacant seat following his election as Governor of New Jersey.

Dramesi died on September 17, 2017, at Pittsburgh, Pennsylvania. On the morning of 20 September 2018, Dramesi was buried at Arlington National Cemetery with full military honors.

== Awards and decorations ==
Included among his awards for valor and service, in addition to receiving two awards of the Air Force Cross, Dramesi was decorated with the Silver Star and twice awarded the Legion of Merit, Distinguished Flying Cross, three Bronze Star Medals, five Purple Hearts, two Meritorious Service Medals and seven Air Medals.

US Air Force Command Pilot Badge
US Air Force Master Parachutist Badge
Air Force Cross w/ 1 bronze oak leaf cluster
Silver Star	Legion of Merit w/ 1 bronze oak leaf cluster	Distinguished Flying Cross w/ 'V' device
Bronze Star w/ 'V' device and 2 bronze oak leaf clusters	Purple Heart w/ 4 bronze oak leaf clusters	Meritorious Service Medal w/ 1 bronze oak leaf cluster
Air Medal w/ 1 silver and 1 bronze oak leaf clusters	Air Force Commendation Medal w/ 1 bronze oak leaf cluster	Air Force Presidential Unit Citation
Air Force Outstanding Unit Award w/ 'V' device and 3 bronze oak leaf clusters	Air Force Outstanding Unit Award (second ribbon required for accouterment spacing)	Prisoner of War Medal
Combat Readiness Medal	National Defense Service Medal	Armed Forces Expeditionary Medal w/ 1 bronze service star
Vietnam Service Medal w/ 2 silver and 2 bronze campaign stars	Vietnam Service Medal w/ 2 bronze campaign stars (second ribbon required for accoutrement spacing)	Air Force Longevity Service Award w/ 1 silver oak leaf cluster
Small Arms Expert Marksmanship Ribbon	Republic of Vietnam Gallantry Cross	Vietnam Campaign Medal

=== Air Force Cross citations ===
==== First award ====
Colonel [then Captain] John A. Dramesi
U.S. Air Force
13th Tactical Fighter Squadron, Korat RTAFB, Thailand
Date of Action: 2 April 1967

The President of the United States of America, authorized by Title 10, Section 8742, United States Code, takes pleasure in presenting the Air Force Cross to Colonel [then Captain] John Arthur Dramesi, United States Air Force, for extraordinary heroism in connection with military operations against an opposing armed force while serving as Pilot of an F-105 of the 13th Tactical Fighter Squadron, 388th Tactical Fighter Wing, Korat Royal Thai Air Base, Thailand, PACIFIC Air Force, in action near Dong Hoi, North Vietnam, on 2 April 1967. On that date, Captain Dramesi was the leader of a flight of F-105 aircraft scheduled to strike a suspected surface-to-air missile site and perform reconnaissance of a hostile highway. Although intelligence reports indicated the area contained a heavy concentration of 37-mm. and 5-mm. flak position, deadly anti-aircraft guns, and possible missile fire, Captain Dramesi successfully executed his attack and placed all ordnance on target. He then began his low level reconnaissance of the highway. When only a few miles from his target, his aircraft was hit by an intense barrage of ground fire and immediately burst into flames, forcing him to eject into the hostile jungle. Immediately after ejecting from his aircraft, Captain Dramesi acted as a ground forward air controller, pointing out targets and safest approaches. Repeated rescue attempts were met with withering fire from the ground. As the ground and air battle raged on, he continued to request ordnance, giving corrections which brought each successive strike closer to his own position. The last correction he had given brought the ordnance within a few meters of his last known position and no further transmissions were received from him. By his selfless and heroic concern for the rescue crews in the air, and his continued request for close ordnance delivery, Captain Dramesi displayed outstanding courage and exemplified the highest traditions and standards of the American fighting man's code. Through his extraordinary heroism, superb airmanship, and calm aggressiveness in the face of hostile forces, Captain Dramesi reflected the highest credit upon himself and the United States Air Force.

==== Second award ====
Colonel John A. Dramesi
U.S. Air Force
For actions while a prisoner of war, U.S. Air Force
Date of Action: May 1969 to December 1969

The President of the United States of America, authorized by Title 10, Section 8742, United States Code, takes pleasure in presenting a Bronze Oak Leaf Cluster in lieu of a Second Award of the Air Force Cross to Colonel John Arthur Dramesi, United States Air Force, for extraordinary heroism in military operations against an opposing armed force while a Prisoner of War in North Vietnam from May 1969 to November 1969. For a full year, Colonel Dramesi planned an escape from a North Vietnamese prison camp near the edge of the city of Hanoi and escaped on the evening of 10 May 1969. Though later recaptured, this escape resulted in great embarrassment to the enemy and materially lifted the morale of all American prisoners in the camp. Though severely tortured, Colonel Dramesi refused to give information or submit to any demands. Many more brutalities were heaped upon him, and he remained in irons for six months. By his extraordinary heroism, loyalty, and discipline in the face of the enemy, Colonel Dramesi reflected the highest credit upon himself and the United States Air Force.
