= Duane D. Hackney =

US Air Force airman and recipient of the Purple Heart medal

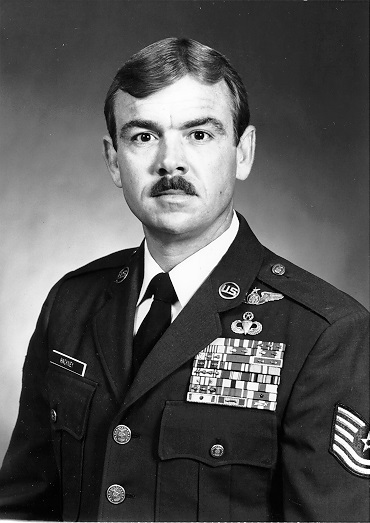
- Duane D. Hackney as a technical sergeant
- Born: 5 June 1947; Flint, Michigan, U.S.
- Died: 3 September 1993 (aged 46); Pennsylvania, U.S.
- Military career
- Allegiance: United States
- Branch: United States Air Force
- Service years: 1965–1991
- Rank: Chief Master Sergeant
- Nickname: Moe
- Unit: 37th Aerospace Rescue and Recovery Squadron
- Conflicts: Vietnam War
- Awards: Air Force Cross; Silver Star; Distinguished Flying Cross (4) w/ Combat V Airman's Medal; Purple Heart (2)

Duane Dale Hackney (June 5, 1947 – September 3, 1993) was a United States Air Force pararescueman. He was the most decorated enlisted man in USAF history and the recipient of 28 decorations for valor in combat and more than 70 awards and decorations in all. He served in the Air Force from 1965 to 1991, retiring as a chief master sergeant. A recipient of the Air Force Cross, he was the first living enlisted man to receive the medal, and at the time of its award he was its youngest recipient.

== Early life ==
Duane Hackney was born on June 5, 1947, in Flint, Michigan. He graduated from Beecher High School in 1965.

== Military career ==
Hackney enlisted in the United States Air Force on June 18, 1965, and was trained as a pararescue specialist.

=== Vietnam War ===
Three days after arriving in Vietnam, Hackney flew his first combat mission. Somewhere on that mission, a .30-caliber slug buried itself in his leg. To avoid being grounded by the medics, he had one of his PJ friends remove the slug with a probe. That incident set the tone for the more than 200 combat missions he was to fly during his three and a half years of Vietnam duty.

Five times in the months ahead, his helicopters were shot down. He did not recall how often he went down into the jungle looking for survivors or how many lives his medical training helped him save. He was awarded four Distinguished Flying Crosses, not for flying a certain number of missions but for specific acts of heroism, and 18 Air Medals. Then came the Air Force Cross, for which he was the first living recipient, the Silver Star, the Airman's Medal, the Purple Heart, and several foreign decorations.

Hackney's most celebrated mission was on February 6, 1967, when two HH-3 helicopters, Jolly Green 05 and Jolly Green 36, launched from the 38th Aerospace Rescue and Recovery Squadron at Udorn Air Base, Udorn, Thailand. They were attempting the recovery of a downed O-1F pilot, Nail 65 (Maj. Lucius Heiskell), near the Mu Gia Pass, North Vietnam. After Airman Hackney made one unsuccessful trip to the ground in search of the pilot, both Jollys returned to base due to foul weather. Later in the day, the helicopters launched again and located the survivor. Airman Hackney was lowered to the ground, and after securing the survivor into the Stokes litter, both were lifted out. No sooner did they reach Jolly 05's door when ground fire erupted. As they raced to exit the area, the helicopter was hit with a 37 mm anti-aircraft round and caught fire. With complete disregard for his own welfare, Airman Hackney removed his parachute and placed it on the survivor. He moved to grab another one from storage as the helicopter was hit by a second round. In an instant, it exploded, just as Airman Hackney slipped his arms through the harness. He was blown out of Jolly 05 by the explosion. Hanging from the harness, he pulled the ripcord and the chute opened just as he hit the trees, where he fell a further 80 feet and came to rest on a ledge in a crevasse. He narrowly avoided capture while enemy troops jumped across the crevasse. Jolly 36 immediately made a run in to locate any survivors and found only burning wreckage, with Hackney waving his arms for pickup. He was the only survivor.

Hackney went on to receive more than 70 individual awards, becoming the most decorated enlisted man in United States Air Force history. He was the winner of the Cheney Award for 1967. The Cheney Award is given annually to a member of USAF for an act of valor, extreme fortitude, or self-sacrifice in a humanitarian interest performed in conjunction with aircraft. Upon his return from Vietnam in 1967, Hackney was deployed to the 41st Aerospace Rescue & Recovery Squadron at Hamilton Air Force Base, in Marin County, California. Shortly after the awarding of his Air Force Cross on September 9, 1967, Hackney made a guest appearance on The Ed Sullivan Show. In 1991 he retired as a chief master sergeant.

== Death and legacy ==
Duane D. Hackney died of a heart attack on September 3, 1993. He was 46 years old.

In June 2006, the training facility at Lackland Air Force Base near San Antonio was renamed the Hackney Training Complex. The facility has space to train up to 1,200 people, and a staff of 50. His widow, Carole Hackney Bergstrom, said about the dedication: "I just wish he could see this. I think he'd really be proud of what he did. He would tell you, 'All this stuff wasn't necessary. I was just doing my job.'"

In 2009, Hackney was inducted into the Michigan Aviation Hall of Fame.

== Military awards and decorations ==
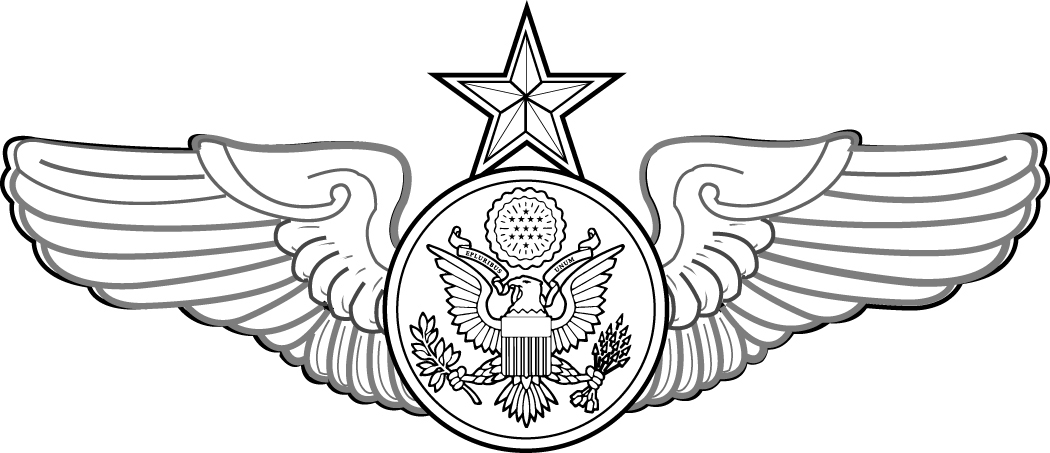

Badge	USAF Senior Enlisted Aircrew Badge		
badge	Master Parachutist Badge		
1st row	Air Force Cross		
2nd row	Silver Star	Distinguished Flying Cross w/ Combat "V"	Airman's Medal
3rd row	Purple Heart	Meritorious Service Medal	Air Medal (18 total awards)
4th row	Air Medal	Commendation Medal	Presidential Unit Citation
5th row	Outstanding Unit Award w/ Combat "V"	Combat Readiness Medal	Good Conduct Medal
6th row	Outstanding Airman of the Year Ribbon	National Defense Service Medal	Armed Forces Expeditionary Medal
7th row	Vietnam Service Medal	Korea Defense Service Medal	Humanitarian Service Medal
8th row	Air Force Overseas Short Tour Service Ribbon	Air Force Overseas Long Tour Service Ribbon	Air Force Longevity Service Award
9th row	NCO PME Graduate Ribbon	Small Arms Expert Marksmanship Ribbon	Air Force Training Ribbon
10th row	Korea Presidential Unit Citation	Vietnam Gallantry Cross Unit Citation	Vietnam Campaign Medal

=== Air Force Cross citation ===
The text of Hackney's Air Force Cross citation reads:

The President of the United States of America, authorized by Title 10, Section 8742, United States Code, takes pleasure in presenting the Air Force Cross to Airman Second Class Duane D. Hackney (AFSN: 16827003), United States Air Force, for extraordinary heroism in military operations against an opposing armed force while serving with the 37th Aerospace Rescue and Recovery Squadron, 3d Air Rescue and Recovery Group, DaNang Air Base, Vietnam, as a Paramedic (Pararescueman) on an unarmed HH-3E Rescue Helicopter near Mu Gia Pass, North Vietnam, on 6 February 1967. On that date, Airman Hackney flew two sorties in a heavily defended hostile area. On the first sortie, despite the presence of armed forces known to be hostile, entrenched in the vicinity, Airman Hackney volunteered to be lowered into the jungle to search for the survivor. He searched until the controlling Search and Rescue agency ordered an evacuation of the rescue crew. On the second sortie, Airman Hackney located the downed pilot, who was hoisted into the helicopter. As the rescue crew departed the area, intense and accurate 37-mm. flak tore into the helicopter amidships, causing extensive damage and a raging fire aboard the craft. With complete disregard for his own safety, Airman Hackney fitted his parachute to the rescued man. In this moment of impending disaster, Airman Hackney chose to place his responsibility to the survivor above his own life. The courageous Pararescueman located another parachute for himself and had just slipped his arms through the harness when a second 37-mm. round struck the crippled aircraft, sending it out of control. The force of the explosion blew Airman Hackney through the open cargo door and, though stunned, he managed to deploy the unbuckled parachute and make a successful landing. He was later recovered by a companion helicopter. Through his extraordinary heroism, superb airmanship, and aggressiveness in the face of hostile forces, Airman Hackney reflected the highest credit upon himself and the United States Air Force.

== Publications ==
The Pararescue Association. (1996). Airman Second Class Duane D. Hackney, p. 112: Fine Books Publishing Company, LLC. Charlotte, NC. Library of Congress Number 94-061879
