= Hanoi March =

Vietnamese wartime propaganda event in 1966

The Hanoi March (known alternatively as the Hanoi Parade) was a propaganda event held on July 6, 1966, involving U.S. prisoners of war during the Vietnam War. During the march, members of the North Vietnamese Army paraded 52 American POWs through the streets of Hanoi before tens of thousands of North Vietnamese civilians. The march soon deteriorated into near riot conditions, with North Vietnamese civilians beating the POWs along the 2 miles (3.2 km) route and their guards largely unable to control the melee.

Occurring relatively early in the war, the event highlighted the mistreatment of American prisoners and brought international criticism down upon the Hanoi regime. Later, as the war became increasingly unpopular in the United States and abroad, concern for the welfare of captured U.S. service members would become one of the few areas of common ground between opponents and supporters of the conflict.

== Background ==
Occurring shortly before the second anniversary of the Gulf of Tonkin incident, the Hanoi March was an attempt by the government of North Vietnam to call international attention to what it considered the illegal bombing of the north by the United States. In the months preceding the march, indications from Hanoi suggested that the American prisoners, most of whom were captured airmen, might be subjected to trials for war crimes. The march of the POWs through civilian crowds was meant to demonstrate the North Vietnamese public's anger over the bombing campaign.

On the afternoon of July 6, thirty-six POWS from the camp at Cu Loc nicknamed "The Zoo", and sixteen from the "Briar Patch" at Xom Ap Lo were transported to the Hàng Đẫy Stadium in central Hanoi. The POWs were issued prison uniforms stenciled with large, non-consecutive three-digit numbers, which they later speculated was intended to suggest that Hanoi held far more American captives than it did; at that point in the war, fewer than a hundred U.S. service members had been captured. Many had spent months in solitary confinement, and the encounter with fellow Americans offered a rare opportunity to communicate, albeit wordlessly. Speaking was forbidden, so the men communicated silently by using a tap code, sharing their names, location, and other information.

Upon arrival at the stadium, a North Vietnamese interrogator known as the "Rabbit" told the men that they were about to "meet the Vietnamese people." From the stadium, the prisoners were chained in pairs and marched down an avenue flanked by tens of thousands of Vietnamese civilians, who were being agitated by soldiers with bullhorns. As the march progressed, North Vietnamese civilians began descending on the prisoners from the bleachers, assaulting the Americans as they marched. As the intensity of the attacks increased, some of the prisoners began to fear that their captors had lost control of the situation and that they might be killed by the civilian mob. Charles G. Boyd, an Air Force pilot shot down near Hanoi in April 1966, later recalled the atmosphere of bedlam as the march progressed.

Very shortly the parade got ugly. The organizers had obviously wanted to get the crowd riled up, angry and even more committed to the war effort, but had no intention of turning the locals loose to maul, and ultimately kill the prisoners. They probably thought one guard per prisoner was enough to hold the crowd at bay. As the evening wore on it was not clear that the prisoner/guard ratio was enough.

In their history of the American POW experience in Vietnam, historians Stuart I. Rochester and Frederick Kiley describe the latter stage of the march as having "fully degenerated into a riot," with even the North Vietnamese political officers themselves fearing for the Americans' safety. After completing the two-mile march, the POWs finally returned to the safety of Hàng Đẫy stadium. After fighting their way through rows of North Vietnamese civilians, each of the cuffed pairs of POWs reached the safety of the interior and were later returned to their prisons.

The following day, senior American officer Jeremiah Denton was taken at bayonet point to see a North Vietnamese camp commander, who asked him through an interpreter what he thought of the march. Rochester and Kiley recount Denton repudiating the event as a "return to barbaric times" and predicting that it would "bring a wave of criticism from the world." In Denton's recollection, the commander responded that "The march was not the idea of the Army of Vietnam. The march was the idea of the people." Denton interpreted these remarks to suggest that the North Vietnamese Communist Party had orchestrated the march and that the army did not appear to endorse the decision.

Numerous European journalists and film crews were present during the march, and their subsequent reporting on the event brought considerable condemnation of North Vietnam's treatment of American prisoners. According to Rochester and Kiley, U.S. officials reacted with a "burst of indignation" that transcended political views on the war. Nineteen senators who had earlier rejected the expansion of the U.S. war effort in Vietnam nonetheless issued a "plea for sanity" to Hanoi, warning that further mistreatment of American prisoners would lead to an inevitable public demand to escalate the war. Internationally, the prime ministers of India and the United Kingdom, Indira Gandhi and Harold Wilson, respectively, urged the Soviet Union to curb North Vietnamese mistreatment of U.S. prisoners. United Nations Secretary General U Thant denounced the march and the broader mistreatment of prisoners, as did Pope Paul VI. Following this criticism, the North Vietnamese walked back from earlier pledges to try the captured Americans for war crimes, and no such trials occurred.

Notable participants

- Everett Alvarez Jr., USN pilot, the first American airman shot down over North Vietnam and the second longest held prisoner of war in American history.
- Charles G. Boyd, USAF pilot, POW for almost 7 years, recipient of the Air Force Cross, who would later become the only Vietnam-era POW to reach the rank of four-star General.
- Edward A. Brudno, USAF pilot, POW for almost 8 years, recipient of the Silver Star, who would commit suicide upon release from captivity in 1973.
- Phillip N. Butler, USN pilot, recipient of two Silver Star and two Legion of Merit awards.
- Jeremiah Denton, USN pilot, recipient of the Navy Cross, who would later be elected a U.S. Senator from Alabama.
- Larry Guarino, USAF pilot, veteran of three wars, prisoner of war for over 8 years, recipient of the Air Force Cross.
- Richard P. Keirn, USAF pilot, prisoner of war in both World War II and Vietnam, and one of only two Americans to be a POW in two wars. Captain Keirn was also the first pilot in the war to be shot down by a surface-to-air missile, when his F-4 Phantom was struck on 24 July 1965.
- Hayden Lockhart, USAF pilot, the first U.S. Air Force airman to be shot down over North Vietnam.
- Jon A. Reynolds, USAF pilot, who would retire as a Brigadier General.
- Robinson Risner, USAF pilot, Korean War fighter ace, two-time recipient of the Air Force Cross, who would retire as a Brigadier General.
- Robert H. Shumaker, USN pilot, who would retire as a Rear Admiral.
- Ronald E. Storz, USAF pilot, recipient of the Air Force Cross, who would die in captivity in 1970.
