= Hayden Lockhart =

United States Air Force officer

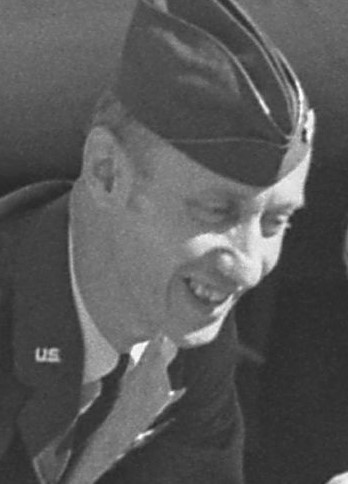
- Lockhart in 1973
- Born: June 16, 1938 (age 88); Cambridge, Massachusetts, U.S.
- Military career
- Allegiance: United States
- Branch: United States Air Force
- Service years: 1961–1981
- Rank: Lieutenant Colonel
- Unit: 613th Tactical Fighter Squadron
- Conflicts: Vietnam War
- Awards: Silver Star; Legion of Merit; Distinguished Flying Cross; Bronze Star Medal (2); Purple Heart (2); Meritorious Service Medal; Air Medal (2)

Hayden James Lockhart (born June 16, 1938) is a retired United States Air Force officer who is best known for being the first U.S. Air Force pilot to be shot down in North Vietnam.

== Early life ==
Lockhart was born in Cambridge, Massachusetts, and graduated in 1961 from the United States Air Force Academy at Colorado Springs, Colorado.

== Military career ==
=== Early career ===
Lockhart was originally stationed at Luke Air Force Base, where he attended Fighter Gunnery School.

Lockhart was commissioned a second lieutenant on June 7, 1961. He was assigned to the 613th Tactical Fighter Squadron, flying the North American F-100 Super Sabre. He arrived in Vietnam in 1964.

=== Vietnam shoot down ===
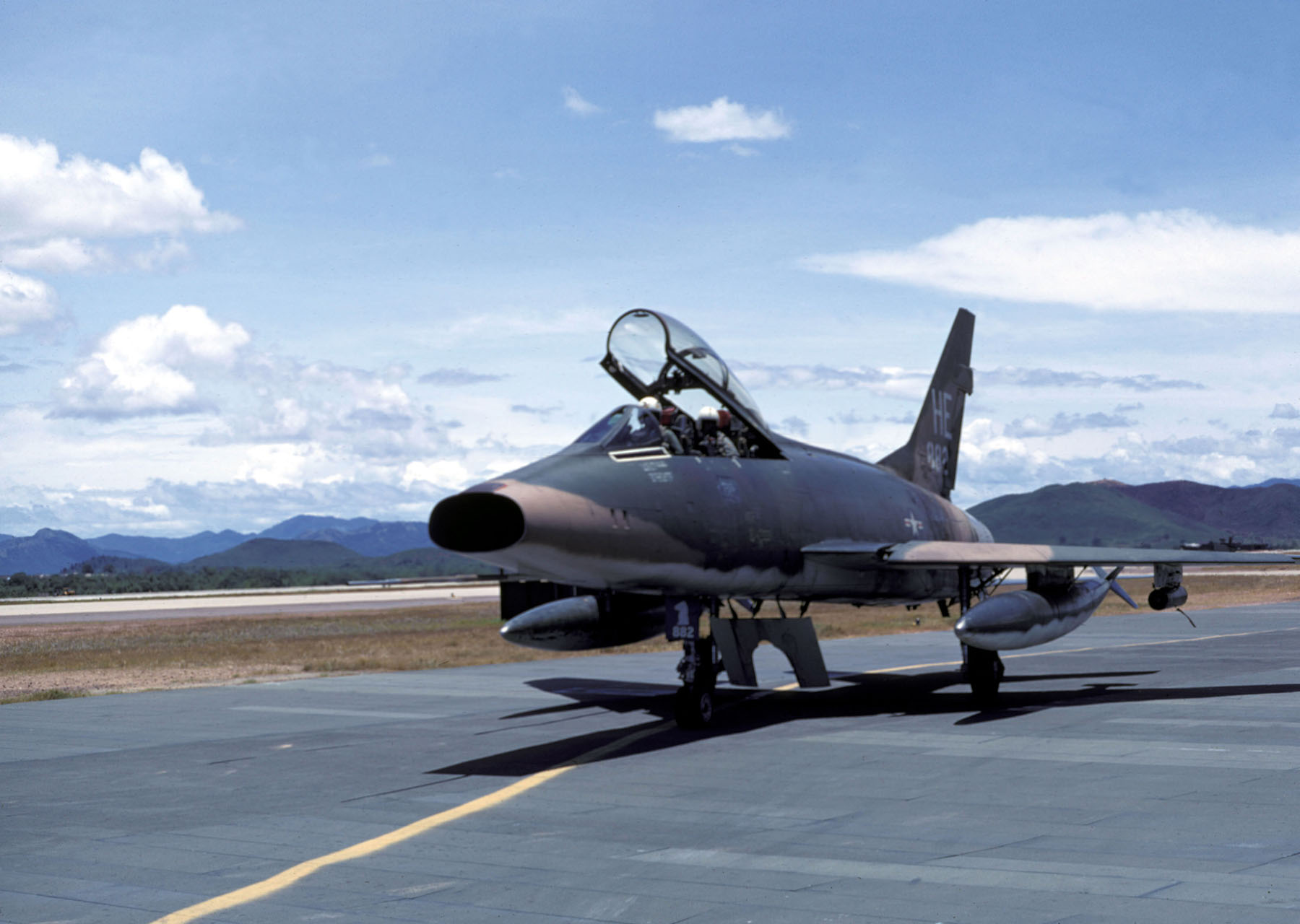
F-100 same aircraft Lockhart was flying when shot down

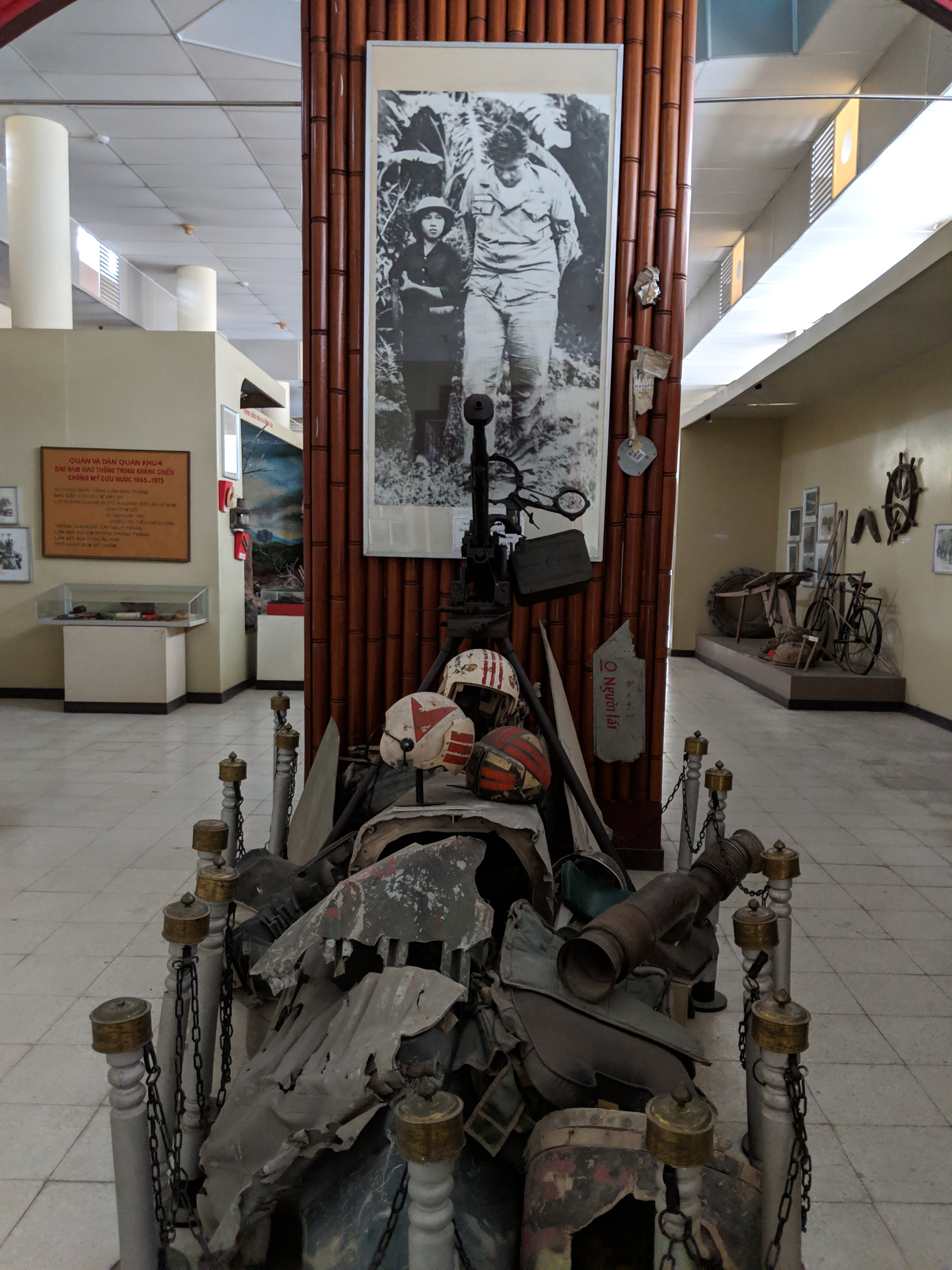
Display of captured US pilot and equipment at the Vinh city Military Museum, not far from where Lockhart's aircraft went down.

Lockhart was shot down March 2, 1965, when he was forced to eject over North Vietnam. After his ejection he evaded capture until March 12, 1965.

“…By summer 1965, more than thirty American airmen had been killed or were presumed missing in action and a dozen had been captured, including the first Air Force POW, Lieutenant Hayden Lockhart. The Navy pilots in this group included Lieutenant Commanders Robert H Shumaker, Raymond Vohden and Lieutenants Phillip Butler and John McKamey…"

=== Prisoner of War in North Vietnam: 1965 to 1973 ===
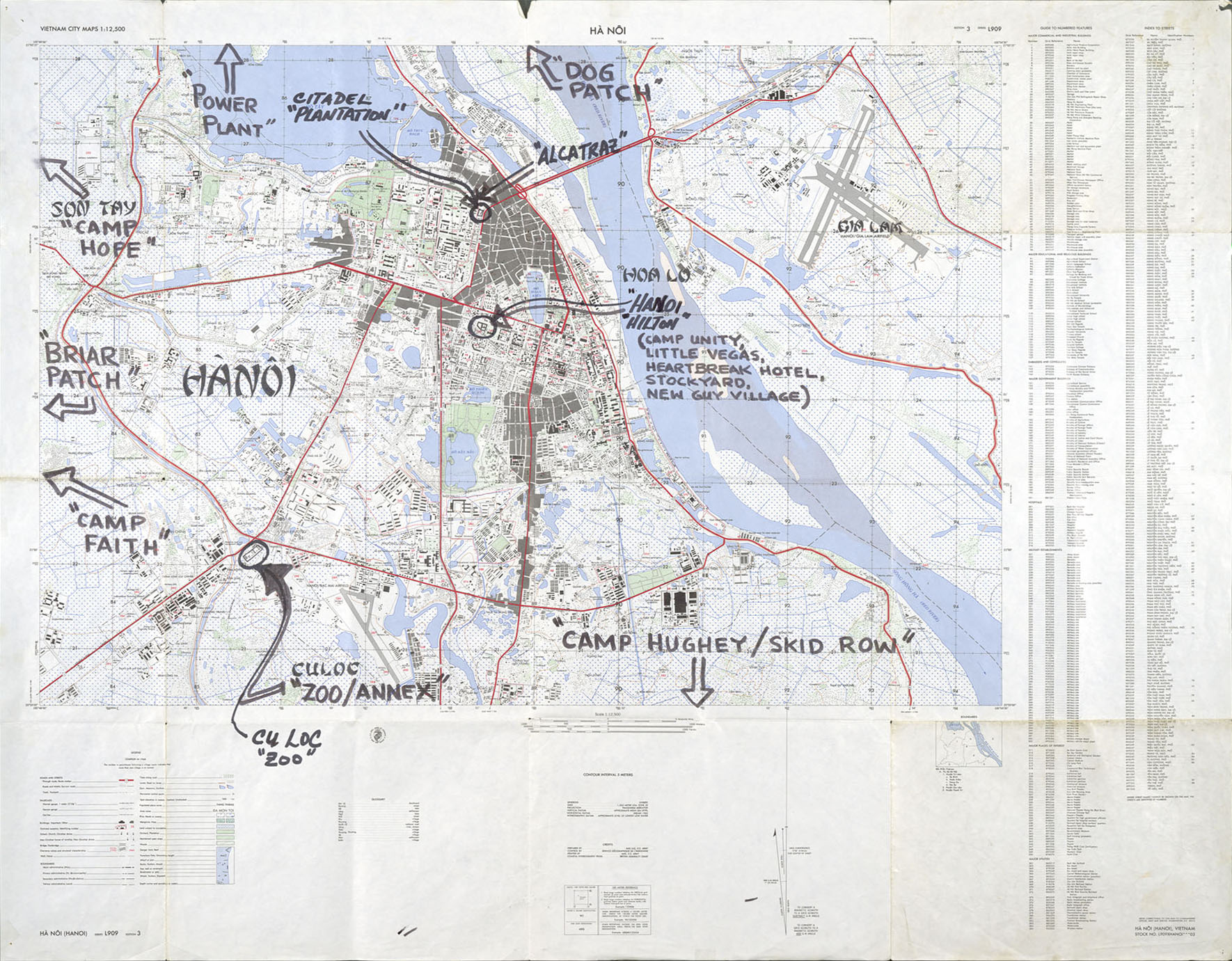
Map of the locations of the US Prisoners of War in Hanoi

Hayden was the third American captured in North Vietnam, and the first Air Force pilot captured in the North during the Vietnam War.

Lockhart spent his time in captivity at several prisoner of war (POW) locations: New Guy Village 1965; Heartbreak Hotel 1965; The Briarpatch in August 1965; Zoo 1966; Zoo Annex 1967; Camp Unity at Hỏa Lò Prison (also known as The Hanoi Hilton); Dogpatch (9 miles south of the Chinese border) May 1972; and Hỏa Lò prison again in January 1973.

On July 6, 1966, 52 US prisoners of war were taken on the March of Hanoi. The prisoners were paraded, handcuffed in pairs, and marched down the main street of Hanoi while angry crowds of people screamed, spat and threw objects at them. A photograph, (published in Look magazine in 1970) showed Lockhart supporting fellow prisoner of war, Phil Butler, who was dazed after being struck by a thrown bottle.

The prisoners supported each other and communicated using a tap code that Lockhart's fellow POW, Carlyle "Smitty" Harris, had learned in a survival school. He was released during "Operation Homecoming" on February 12, 1973.

=== After release ===
Lockhart received an Air Force Institute of Technology assignment to the University of Southern California at Los Angeles to complete his graduate degree.

=== After Vietnam ===
Lockheart's final assignment was on the staff of the Air Force Inspection and Safety Center at Norton AFB, California, from February 1980 until his retirement from the Air Force on December 31, 1981.

Lockhart retired as a lieutenant colonel in 1981.

== Honors and awards ==
Lockhart received the Silver Star, Legion of Merit, Distinguished Flying Cross and Prisoner of War Medal, all after his service in the Vietnam War.

USAF Command Pilot Badge
Silver Star	Legion of Merit	Distinguished Flying Cross
Bronze Star Medal with Valor device and bronze oak leaf cluster	Purple Heart with bronze oak leaf cluster	Meritorious Service Medal
Air Medal with bronze oak leaf cluster	Air Force Outstanding Unit Award with two bronze oak leaf clusters	Prisoner of War Medal
Combat Readiness Medal	National Defense Service Medal	Armed Forces Expeditionary Medal
Vietnam Service Medal with three silver and one bronze campaign stars	Vietnam Service Medal with bronze campaign star (second ribbon required for accouterment spacing)	Air Force Longevity Service Award with four bronze oak leaf clusters
Small Arms Expert Marksmanship Ribbon	Republic of Vietnam Gallantry Cross Unit Citation w/ Palm and Frame	Vietnam Campaign Medal

=== Silver Star citation ===
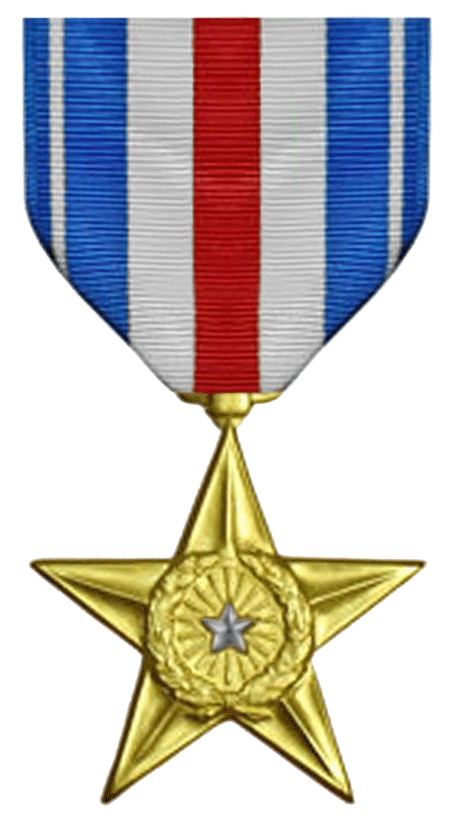

Lockhart Jr., Hayden J.
Major, U.S. Air Force
Prisoner of War, North Vietnam
Date of Action: June 1, 1966

Citation:

The President of the United States of America, authorized by Act of Congress July 9, 1918 (amended by an act of July 25, 1963), takes pleasure in presenting the Silver Star to Major Hayden James Lockhart, Jr., United States Air Force, for gallantry and intrepidity in action in connection with military operations against an opposing armed force on 1 June 1966, while a Prisoner of War in North Vietnam. Ignoring international agreements on treatment of prisoners of war, the enemy resorted to mental and physical cruelties to obtain information, confessions, and propaganda materials. Major Lockhart resisted their demands by calling upon his deepest inner strengths in a manner which reflected his devotion to duty and great credit upon himself and the United States Air Force.

== Bibliography ==
1. Alvarez, Everett and Schreiner, Samuel. Code of Conduct: An Inspirational story of self-healing by the famed ex-pow and war hero, (1991) Donald L Fine, publisher New York. ISBN 1556113102
2. Borling, John: Taps on the Walls: Poems from the Hanoi Hilton, Master Wing Publishing, Pritzker Military Museum and Library 2013 first published as Poems for Pilots (and other people.) ISBN 978-0-615-65905-3
3. Head, William and Grinter Lawrence E; Looking Back on the Vietnam War: A 1990's Perspective on the Decisions, Combat, and Legacies. 1993 Greenwood Press, Westport Connecticut ISBN 0-313-28869-0
4. Wyatt, Captain and Mrs. Frederick A. Wyatt. We Came Home (1977) POW publications; Toluca Lake CA.
5. Coffee, Gerald. Beyond Survival: Building on the Hard Times- a POW's inspiring story. (1990) GP Putnam's Sons New York ISBN 0399134166
