= Charles Lee Harrison =

USMC POW in WWII & Korea

- Born: March 21, 1921; Tulsa, Oklahoma, US
- Died: January 17, 2015 (aged 93) Peardale, California, US
- Buried: Saint Patrick Catholic Cemetery, Grass Valley, California
- Allegiance: United States
- Branch: United States Marine Corps
- Service years: 1939–1969
- Rank: Lieutenant Colonel
- Conflicts: World War II: Battle of Wake Island; Korean War: Battle of Inchon; Battle of Chosin Reservoir; Vietnam War
- Awards: Purple Heart; Prisoner of War Medal (2)

Charles Lee Harrison (March 21, 1921 – January 17, 2015) was a United States Marine Corps lieutenant colonel. He is one of just two Marines to be captured as a prisoner of war (POW) twice, the first during World War II, and the second during the Korean War.

== Early life and World War II ==
Charles L. Harrison was born on March 21, 1921, in Tulsa, Oklahoma. Upon graduating from Sand Springs High School in 1939, Harrison enlisted in the Marine Corps. In August 1941, he was sent to Wake Island as one of 449 Marines to defend the island.

On December 7, 1941, the Japanese attacked Pearl Harbor. Across the International Date Line just a few hours later on December 8, Japanese aircraft bombed Wake Island. While the Marines were able to repulse the first Japanese landing attempt on December 11, the Japanese successfully landed on December 23 and captured the island and all of the defenders.

=== First experience as POW ===
Private First Class Harrison and the other prisoners were held on the airfield, exposed to the sun with no food and little water for 54 hours until the evening of December 25. On January 12, 1942, the prisoners were loaded aboard the Nitta Maru. Harrison and the other enlisted personnel were kept into the cargo holds while the ship sailed to Japan. On January 18, the ship arrived in Yokohama where some of the officers were sent to camps. Most of the prisoners, including Harrison, remained on the ship and continued on to China.

The prisoners arrived at Wusong POW Camp in Shanghai on January 24. Harrison was packed with 200 other men in a dilapidated barracks which offered little protection from the elements. An electric fence surrounded the camp, which electrocuted a few men who accidentally touched it. Harrison and the other prisoners were routinely beaten and were fed very little.

In December 1942, Harrison and most of the other POWs from Wake Island were transferred to Jiangwan (now part of Hongkou, Shanghai), several miles away. The conditions at Jiangwan were slightly better than those at Wusong. However, from January 1943 to September 1944, Harrison and the other enlisted men worked hard labor at a rifle range, and many suffered from malnourishment and tuberculosis as a result of their starvation diets.

In May 1945, Harrison and the other prisoners were transported by train 100 miles to Nanjing. By May 14, the prisoners were put in a warehouse outside Beiping, where the conditions were worse than previous camps. On June 19, the POWs were put onto another train and travelled to Busan, South Korea, where the conditions were even worse than the conditions at Beiping. After three days, they were loaded onto a ferry and sent to the island of Honshu, Japan.

Harrison and the other prisoners then got on another train which took them north, before ultimately getting on another ferry which took them to Hokkaido. Harrison was held in a mining camp in Hokkaido for several more months until the war ended and he was released on September 7, 1945.

Having spent 45 months in captivity, Harrison weighed just 110 pounds upon his repatriation. He had also contracted malaria and numerous diseases during his ordeal. Harrison returned to the United States and married his childhood sweetheart in 1946.

== Korean War ==
=== Battle of Chosin Reservoir ===
When the Korean War began in 1950, Staff Sergeant Harrison was assigned to the 1st Military Police Company, 1st Marine Division, and took part in the landing at Inchon on September 15. During the battle of Chosin Reservoir, Harrison and other military policemen were attached to Task Force Drysdale, a composite force of British Royal Marines, US Marines, US Army soldiers, and South Korean troops.

On November 29, 1950, the ill-fated task force fought its way through Chinese forces from Koto-ri to Hagaru-ri. Although the front of the convoy reached Hagaru-ri, the center was badly ambushed and cut off. Major John N. McLaughlin assumed command and the men expended most of their ammunition while fighting in subzero temperatures throughout the night.

After approximately 40 men had been killed another 40 had been wounded, including Harrison, the survivors surrendered as prisoners of war in the early morning hours. Also captured in that same convoy was Chief Warrant Officer Felix J. McCool, who had also previously been held as a POW during World War II.

=== Second experience as POW ===
Harrison and the other prisoners marched north for several weeks, usually at night and during blizzards in order to avoid detection from UN aircraft. Many of the prisoners suffered from frostbite and malnourishment, and they were also randomly interrogated at times during their journey. By the end of December, Harrison and the other prisoners arrived at Kanggye, near the Chinese border. Several of the POWs died during the march and shortly after arriving in Kanggye.

The Chinese put Harrison and the other POWs through a rigorous communist indoctrination program for eight weeks. In March, Harrison made up a group of 60 prisoners (24 Marines) who marched south through Tokchon, Yangdok, and then Majon-ni. Two Marines died during the march. After leaving Majon-ni on April 5, the prisoners were split into two smaller groups. Staff Sergeant Harrison assumed command of the group as they marched further south. Arriving at Chorwon on April 13, their captors told them that they would be released. Approximately 300 additional prisoners were brought into the area and they were kept in a temporary POW camp.

On May 18, Harrison, 17 other Marines and a soldier were separated from the other POWs and trucked to Chunchon. By May 24, Harrison's group was near the front lines when an artillery bombardment fell nearby. The guards all ran in the same direction for cover, while Harrison and the rest of the POWs ran in the opposite direction up high ground. The men evaded the enemy throughout the night.

On May 25, Harrison's group spelled out "POWS – 19 RESCUE" using makeshift air panels they made from wallpaper from a nearby house. An Army reconnaissance pilot spotted the signal and radioed their position to a friendly unit, which promptly moved forward and rescued the 19 prisoners.

Harrison's group of prisoners were the only ones to face indoctrination and escape captivity during the war. Harrison later reflected that his Japanese captors hated him, however he admired them because of their patriotic devotion to their cause. He thought the Chinese, however, were deceitful by pretending to be their friends.

== Later career and life ==
Harrison stayed in the Marine Corps after the Korean War and was commissioned as an officer. He later served in the Vietnam War before retiring at the rank of lieutenant colonel on June 30, 1969. After retirement, he moved his family to the small town of Peardale, California, where he served as an auxiliary police officer in Grass Valley.

Charles L. Harrison died on January 17, 2015, in his home in Peardale. He was buried in Saint Patrick Catholic Cemetery in Grass Valley.

== See also ==
- John C. Giraudo
- Richard P. Keirn
- Felix J. McCool
