= Felix J. McCool =

USMC POW in WWII & Korea

Felix James McCool
- Born: June 14, 1912; Pawhuska, Oklahoma, US
- Died: December 27, 1972 (aged 60) Dade City, Florida, US
- Buried: Woodland Park Cemetery South, Miami, Florida, US
- Allegiance: United States
- Branch: Oklahoma National Guard; United States Marine Corps
- Service years: 1934–1960
- Rank: Chief Warrant Officer 3
- Conflicts: World War II: Philippines campaign (1941–1942); Battle of Bataan; Battle of Corregidor; Korean War: Battle of Chosin Reservoir
- Awards: Purple Heart (2); Prisoner of War Medal (2)

A spoken version of the article in English.

Felix James McCool (June 14, 1912 – December 27, 1972) was a United States Marine Corps chief warrant officer 3. He is one of two Marines to be captured as a prisoner of war (POW) twice, the first during World War II, and the second during the Korean War. Spending more than six years total in captivity, McCool held the record as the longest-held Marine POW until surpassed by several other Marines during the Vietnam War.

== Early life and World War II ==
Felix J. McCool was born on June 14, 1912, in Pawhuska, Oklahoma. In 1934, he joined the Oklahoma National Guard. McCool enlisted into the Marine Corps as an infantryman in 1938 and was assigned to the 4th Marine Regiment in Shanghai, China. In November 1941, the regiment was relocated to the Philippines.

=== Battle of the Philippines ===
In December 1941, the United States was drawn into World War II when the Japanese attacked Pearl Harbor and invaded the Philippines. Sergeant McCool took part in the fighting on Bataan before the regiment fell back to the island of Corregidor. On May 5, Japanese troops attacked Corregidor and captured the island the next day. Sergeant McCool was wounded during the battle and subsequently captured, along with the rest of the 4th Marine Regiment.

=== First experience as POW ===
The prisoners were held on Corregidor for the next several weeks, where they were placed on a starvation diet. They also were required to bow to any Japanese soldier they crossed paths with, and would be beaten for various reasons, sometimes for no apparent reason at all. On May 24, the prisoners were loaded onto landing barges and transported to Manila, where they were forced to march in a Japanese "Victory Parade" through the city.

Sergeant McCool and his fellow prisoners were tightly packed into cattle cars and shipped to various camps on the island. McCool's group arrived at a Japanese airfield where he performed forced labor. McCool worked several different jobs which enabled him to smuggle medical supplies in for sick prisoners. He did this despite routine beatings and the threat of being executed. McCool and some fellow prisoners also managed to sabotage the runway, causing a Japanese plane to crash.

McCool and many of his fellow prisoners were loaded onto a hell ship and transported to the Japanese island of Kyushu. They were taken to the prisoner of war camp Fukuoka 17, where they were forced to work in the Mitsui Miike coal mine. McCool continued engaging in sabotage for the next 13 months, before the war ended and he was liberated on August 29, 1945, after more than three years in captivity.

== Korean War ==
=== Battle of Chosin Reservoir ===
Upon returning to the United States, McCool decided to stay in the Marine Corps. By the start of the Korean War in 1950, McCool was promoted to chief warrant officer and was assigned to the 1st Service Battalion, 1st Marine Division as a supply officer. During the battle of Chosin Reservoir, McCool was attached to Task Force Drysdale, a composite force of British Royal Marines, US Marines, US Army soldiers, and South Korean troops.

On November 29, 1950, the ill-fated task force fought its way through Chinese forces from Koto-ri to Hagaru-ri. Although the front of the convoy reached Hagaru-ri, the center was badly ambushed and cut off. Fighting in subzero temperatures throughout the night, Major John N. McLaughlin assumed command, and Chief Warrant Officer McCool and several other officers helped McLaughlin organize the remaining elements of the center of the convoy.

After approximately 40 men had been killed and with very little ammunition remaining, McCool and 80 other survivors, half of whom were wounded, surrendered as prisoners of war in the early morning hours. Also captured in that same convoy was Staff Sergeant Charles L. Harrison, who had also previously been held as a POW during World War II.

=== Second experience as POW ===
McCool and the other prisoners marched north for several weeks, usually at night and during blizzards in order to avoid detection from UN aircraft. Many of the prisoners suffered from frostbite and malnourishment, and they were also randomly interrogated at times during their journey. On December 26, McCool and other officers arrived at Kanggye, near the Chinese border. Several of the POWs died during the march and shortly after arriving in Kanggye.

The Chinese put McCool and the other POWs through a rigorous communist indoctrination program for eight weeks. In March, Warrant Officer McCool, Major McLaughlin, and several other Marine officers were moved to Camp 5, on a peninsula on the Yalu River in Pyoktong. The conditions in Camp 5 were brutal, and many prisoners died from starvation and lack of medical care. McCool was one of the last prisoners to receive the Sacrament of Penance from Captain Emil J. Kapaun. Kapaun, an Army Chaplain, died shortly after and was posthumously awarded the Medal of Honor.

In November 1951, McCool and the other officers were transferred 10 miles east to Camp 2 in Pi-chong-ni, where he would remain for the rest of the war. At one point during his captivity, McCool spit out a window and accidentally hit a guard. He was punished by being sentenced to solitary confinement in a hole three feet square by three and a half feet deep. Feces covered the floor of the hole, along with an abundant number of lice and fleas, and spikes were put through the lid covering the hole, forcing McCool to sit in a hunched position.

After 50 hours in confinement, McCool was taken to the camp headquarters where the Chinese demanded he confess to rape and pillaging. Refusing, he was sent back to the hole. McCool was offered words of encouragement from fellow prisoners 70 hours into his ordeal. McCool considered suicide, however, he ended up confessing that he cursed the North Koreans and hated the Chinese Communists. He refused to incriminate his fellow officers in crimes. After 80 hours, McCool was finally released from confinement and returned to the camp. Fellow prisoners gave McCool clean clothing and helped him wash himself.

McCool was repatriated on September 5, 1953 during Operation Big Switch, after nearly three more years of captivity. McCool later reflected on both of his POW experiences, stating that he hated the Chinese much more than he hated the Japanese. He believed that while the Japanese were just as brutal as the Chinese, the Japanese had character and the Chinese had none.

== Later career and life ==
Chief Warrant Officer 3 McCool retired from the Marines in 1960. He and his wife moved to Florida, where he attended the University of Miami. McCool later became a teacher at Killian High School in Miami and wrote a book about his experiences, Let's Face It: Memoirs, Speeches and Writings of a Career Marine and Two-Time Prisoner of War.

Felix J. McCool died on December 27, 1972, in Dade City, Florida. In 2015, McCool was inducted into the Oklahoma Military Hall of Fame.

== Awards and decorations ==

Purple Heart w/ one 5/16" Gold Star		Navy Presidential Unit Citation w/ two 3/16" Bronze Stars
Army Presidential Unit Citation	Prisoner of War Medal w/ one 3/16" Bronze Star	Selected Marine Corps Reserve Medal
China Service Medal	American Defense Service Medal w/ Fleet Clasp (3/16" Bronze Star)	American Campaign Medal
Asiatic-Pacific Campaign Medal w/ one 3/16" Bronze Star	World War II Victory Medal	National Defense Service Medal
Korean Service Medal w/ three 3/16" Bronze Stars	Republic of Korea Presidential Unit Citation	Philippine Republic Presidential Unit Citation
Philippine Defense Medal w/ one 3/16" Bronze Star	United Nations Korea Medal	Republic of Korea War Service Medal

== See also ==
- John C. Giraudo
- Charles Lee Harrison
- Richard P. Keirn
