= John C. Giraudo =

USAF POW in WWII & Korea

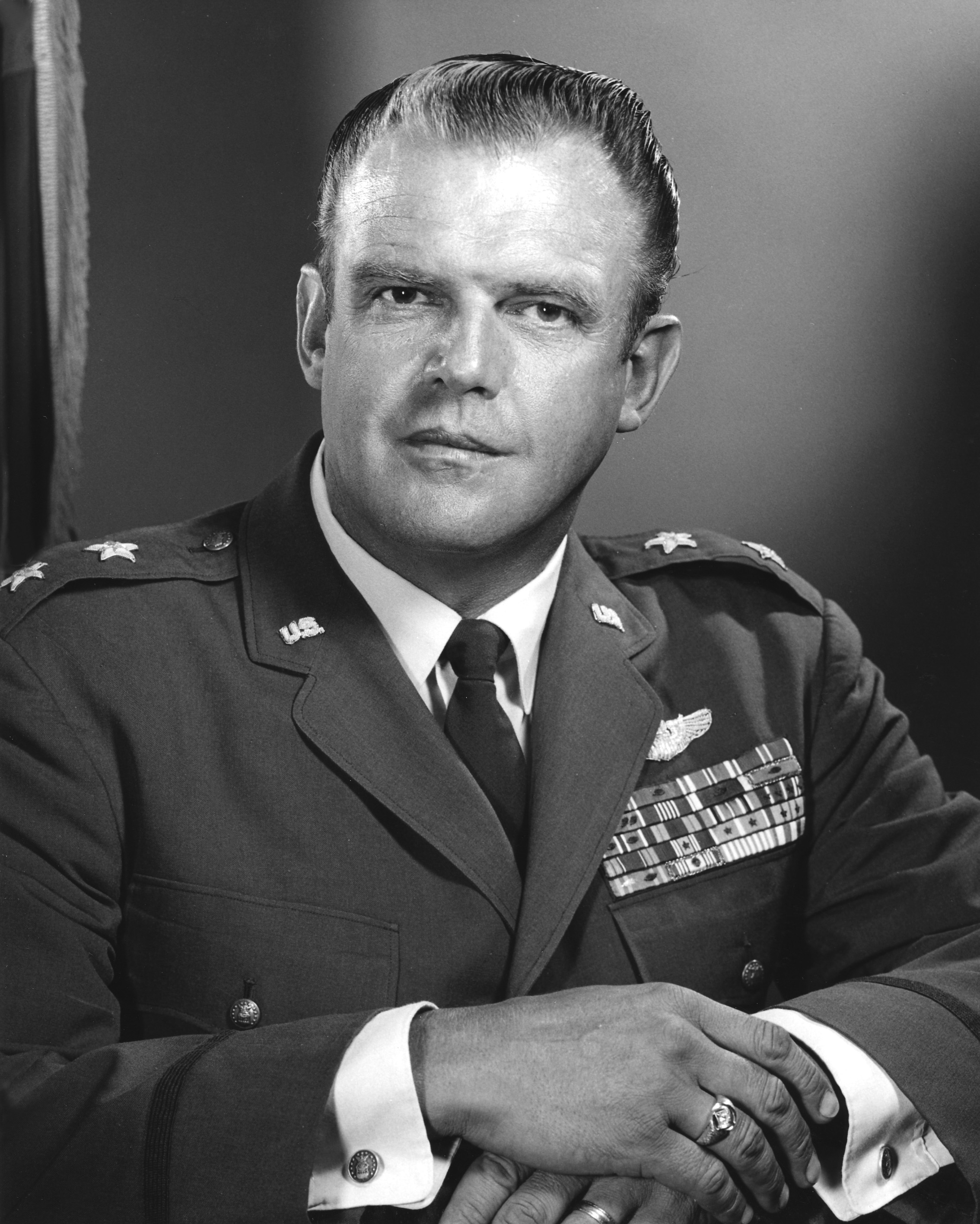
- Born: October 2, 1923; Santa Barbara, California
- Died: June 17, 1996 (aged 72); St. Petersburg, Florida
- Military career
- Allegiance: United States
- Branch: United States Army Air Forces; United States Air Force
- Service years: 1942–1977
- Rank: Major General
- Units: 15th Air Force; 51st Fighter-Interceptor Wing; 355th Tactical Fighter Wing
- Commands: 25th Fighter Interceptor Squadron; USAF Weapons School; 7272nd Flying Training Wing; 49th Tactical Fighter Wing; 355th Tactical Fighter Wing; 17th Air Force
- Conflicts: World War II; Korean War; Vietnam War
- Awards: Silver Star; Legion of Merit (2); Distinguished Flying Cross; Bronze Star Medal; Purple Heart (2); Air Medal (18); Prisoner of War Medal (2)

John Charles Giraudo (October 2, 1923 – June 17, 1996) was a highly decorated United States Air Force major general. He is one of just a few Americans to be shot down and captured as a prisoner of war on two occasions, first during World War II and again during the Korean War.

== Early life and World War II ==
John Giraudo was born on October 2, 1923, in Santa Barbara, California. He was attending college in Santa Barbara when Pearl Harbor was attacked in December 1941. Giraudo subsequently dropped out of college and enlisted into the United States Army Air Forces on March 25, 1942, and entered the Aviation Cadet Training Program.

On March 10, 1943, Giraudo was commissioned as a second lieutenant and awarded his flying wings. Giraudo was assigned to the 720th Bombardment Squadron at Alamogordo Army Air Field, New Mexico, where he flew B-17 Flying Fortresses and B-24 Liberators. By late 1943, Giraudo was a squadron leader flying missions with the Fifteenth Air Force in the Mediterranean Theater.

On February 25, 1944, Captain Giraudo was flying a B-24 on a bombing mission over Regensburg in Bavaria, Germany. Giraudo's aircraft was shot down and he was captured by German troops and taken to Stalag Luft I in Barth. He would spend more than one year as a prisoner of war, until the camp was liberated by Russian troops on April 30, 1945.

== Post-World War II ==
After World War II, Giraudo became the assistant director of flying at Mather Air Force Base, California. While there, he helped establish the first triple-rated (pilot-navigator-bombardier) training course in the United States Air Force.

Giraudo graduated from the Air Tactical School in 1947 and Instructor Pilot School in 1948 before he was attached to Tyndall Air Force Base, Florida. He helped develop the first jet all-weather instrument flying program in the Lockheed T-33. Giraudo then flew F-80 Shooting Stars, F-89 Scorpions, and F-94 Starfires as part of the first all-weather jet interceptor program in the Air Force.

In 1950, Giraudo graduated from Aircraft Gunnery School at Nellis Air Force Base, Nevada. He was then attached to the staff of the Supreme Allied Commander in Europe, General Dwight D. Eisenhower, while the North Atlantic Treaty Organization was formed.

== Korean War ==
In 1952, Major Giraudo volunteered to serve in Korea. Arriving at Suwon Air Base in November 1952, Giraudo was made the commanding officer of the 25th Fighter-Interceptor Squadron, 51st Fighter-Interceptor Wing. Giraudo shot down two MiG-15s, and probably downed 1.5 more while flying an F-86 Sabre.

While strafing enemy trucks during his 99th combat mission on June 16, 1953, Lieutenant Colonel Giraudo's aircraft was hit by anti-aircraft fire. Giraudo tried to nurse the F-86 to the sea, but he was forced to eject just one mile from the water. Giraudo landed near enemy troops and was successfully evading them when the life raft in his survival equipment unexpectedly inflated. He was shot through the shoulder and was captured by enemy troops for the second time. Giraudo's wingman, Marine Major John Glenn, circled over the area for a period of time while North Korean soldiers hid Giraudo from sight.

Giraudo was taken to a prisoner of war camp, although neither his family nor the Air Force knew he had been taken prisoner and was alive. He was held until October 1953, when he was repatriated during Operation Big Switch.

== Later career and life ==
After the war, Giraudo assumed command of the Aircraft Gunnery School, holding that position until May 1956 when he was assigned as the senior military advisor to the Hawaii Air National Guard. In 1959, he graduated from the Armed Forces Staff College in Norfolk, Virginia. He was then assigned to The Pentagon until 1963.

After graduating from the National War College in 1964, Giraudo was assigned to Wheelus Air Base, Libya. From 1965 to 1967, he was assigned to Spangdahlem Air Base in West Germany, eventually becoming the commanding officer of the 49th Tactical-Fighter Wing.

In August 1967, Giraudo was assigned to Takhli Air Base in Thailand as the commander of the 355th Tactical-Fighter Wing. During the next 12 months, Giraudo flew 100 combat missions during the Vietnam War, including 77 over North Vietnam.

Giraudo was promoted to major general in 1970, and took command of the Seventeenth Air Force in Germany from 1973 to 1975. He retired at MacDill Air Force Base, Florida, on November 1, 1977. John C. Giraudo died of a stroke on June 17, 1996, at Palms of Pasadena Hospital in St. Petersburg, Florida.

== Awards and decorations ==
Maj Gen Giraudo awards include the following:

US Air Force Command Pilot Badge
Air Force Distinguished Service Medal with two bronze oak leaf clusters
Silver Star	Legion of Merit with bronze oak leaf cluster	Distinguished Flying Cross with Valor device
Bronze Star Medal	Purple Heart with bronze oak leaf cluster	Air Medal with three silver and one bronze oak leaf clusters
Air Medal (second ribbon required for accoutrement spacing)	Army Commendation Medal	Air Force Presidential Unit Citation with two bronze oak leaf clusters
Air Force Outstanding Unit Award with Valor device and two bronze oak leaf clusters	Prisoner of War Medal with service star	Combat Readiness Medal
American Campaign Medal	European–African–Middle Eastern Campaign Medal with four bronze campaign stars	World War II Victory Medal
National Defense Service Medal with service star	Korean Service Medal with two bronze campaign stars	Vietnam Service Medal with three bronze campaign stars
Air Force Longevity Service Award with one silver and three bronze oak leaf clusters	Republic of Korea Presidential Unit Citation	Republic of Vietnam Gallantry Cross
United Nations Service Medal for Korea	Vietnam Campaign Medal	Korean War Service Medal

== See also ==
- Charles Lee Harrison
- Richard P. Keirn
- Felix J. McCool
