= Jon A. Reynolds =

U.S. Air Force officer (1937–2022)

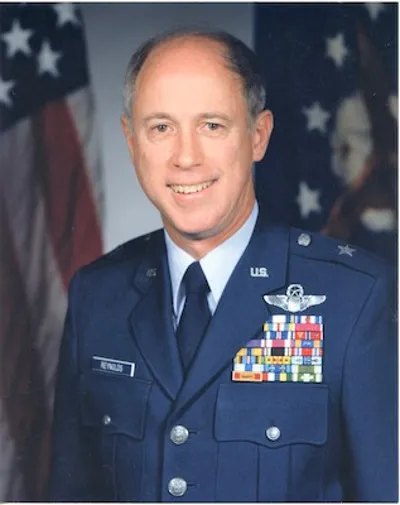
- Jon A. Reynolds
- Born: December 13, 1937; Philadelphia, Pennsylvania, U.S.
- Died: April 16, 2022 (aged 84); Bethesda, Maryland, U.S.
- Burial place: Arlington National Cemetery
- Military career
- Allegiance: United States
- Branch: United States Air Force
- Service years: 1959–1990
- Rank: Brigadier General
- Conflicts: Vietnam War
- Awards: Air Force Distinguished Service Medal; Silver Star (2); Defense Superior Service Medal; Legion of Merit; Distinguished Flying Cross; Bronze Star Medal (2); Air Medal (7); Purple Heart
- Other work: Vice president, Raytheon Company

Brigadier General Jon Anzuena Reynolds (December 13, 1937 – April 16, 2022) was a United States Air Force (USAF) officer who served in the Vietnam War. He was a prisoner of war in North Vietnam from November 1965 to February 1973. Following his release from captivity he continued his USAF career, finally serving as assistant deputy director for attachés.

== Early life and education ==
Reynolds was born in Philadelphia on December 13, 1937. His father worked as an insurance broker; his mother was employed as a nurse. He attended Lower Merion High School, Ardmore, Pennsylvania, graduating in 1955. He received a bachelor's degree in engineering from Trinity College in 1959.

== Military career ==
Reynolds was commissioned as a second lieutenant through the Air Force Reserve Officer Training Corps program and entered active duty in December 1959. From January 1960 to January 1961, he attended primary pilot training at Malden Air Base, Missouri and basic pilot training at Craig Air Force Base, Alabama. He then was assigned to advanced flight training in the F-100 Super Sabre at Luke Air Force Base, Arizona and Nellis Air Force Base, Nevada. In January 1962 he transferred to the 429th Tactical Fighter Squadron at Cannon Air Force Base, New Mexico, as an F-100 pilot.

In March 1963, Reynolds was assigned as an air liaison officer and forward air controller with the Army of the Republic of Vietnam 22nd Infantry Division. He returned to the United States in February 1964 and was assigned to the 4th Tactical Fighter Wing, Seymour Johnson Air Force Base, North Carolina, where he flew the F-105 Thunderchief. During 1964 and 1965, as a member of the 334th and 335th Tactical Fighter Squadrons at Seymour Johnson, he participated in squadron deployments to Incirlik Air Base, Turkey; Yokota Air Base, Japan; Osan Air Base, South Korea; and Takhli Royal Thai Air Force Base, Thailand.

While flying a mission near Yên Bái, North Vietnam, on November 28, 1965, Reynolds' F-105D was shot down. He ejected, was captured and interned as a prisoner of war. On July 6, 1966, he was one of the prisoners forced to participate in the Hanoi March. He was among the first group of American prisoners released during Operation Homecoming on February 12, 1973.

Following his return from captivity, Reynolds undertook graduate study through the Air Force Institute of Technology. In 1975 he received a master's degree in military history from Duke University. From July 1975 to June 1979, he served at the U.S. Air Force Academy as a history department member and directed the world and area studies and military history programs. He graduated from Air War College in 1978. He then was assigned as a politico-military affairs officer in the Western Hemisphere Division, Directorate of Plans, Headquarters U.S. Air Force, Washington D.C. In July 1980, he became a National War College faculty member. He received his doctorate in military history from Duke University in 1980. In June 1981 he returned to Air Force headquarters as chief of the Western Hemisphere Division, Directorate of Plans. During this tour, he served as a delegate to the Inter-American Defense Board and was a member of the Canada-United States Permanent Joint Board on Defense and the Canada-United States Military Cooperation Committee.

From March 1982 to March 1984, Reynolds attended Defense Intelligence School and studied Mandarin Chinese through the State Department's Foreign Service Institute. He was Air attaché and then defense/air attaché to the People's Republic of China from April 1984 to January 1988. During the time he was senior U.S. military representative there, he simultaneously served as head of the U.S. security assistance effort in Beijing. He was responsible for managing almost $1 billion in security assistance programs and was the first westerner to fly a People's Liberation Army Air Force fighter aircraft. He was promoted to brigadier general on October 1, 1986. He became military assistant to the Secretary of the Air Force in February 1988. In August 1989, he became assistant deputy director for attachés, Defense Intelligence Agency, Washington, D.C., responsible for directing 96 U.S. defense attaché offices worldwide.

Reynolds retired from the USAF on September 1, 1990.

== Personal life ==
Reynolds married Emilee McCarthy in 1974. They had been engaged and were scheduled to marry several weeks before his capture in 1965. Together, they had two children: Elizabeth and Andrew.

Following his retirement, Reynolds joined Raytheon Company as vice president for international technology programs, first working on the destruction of American chemical weapons at the Johnston Atoll Chemical Agent Disposal System and then as head of sales in China from 1994 to 2000. He initially resided in Greenville, Delaware, before relocating to Bethesda, Maryland, in his later years. He died there of lung cancer on April 16, 2022, aged 84.

== Decorations ==
Reynolds' military decorations and awards include the Air Force Distinguished Service Medal; Silver Star with oak leaf cluster; Defense Superior Service Medal; Legion of Merit; Distinguished Flying Cross; Bronze Star Medal with "V" device and oak leaf cluster; Air Medal with six oak leaf clusters; Purple Heart; Meritorious Service Medal with two oak leaf clusters; Republic of Vietnam Campaign Medal and Santos-Dumont Merit Medal.
