= Edward A. Brudno =

United States Air Force captain and prisoner of war

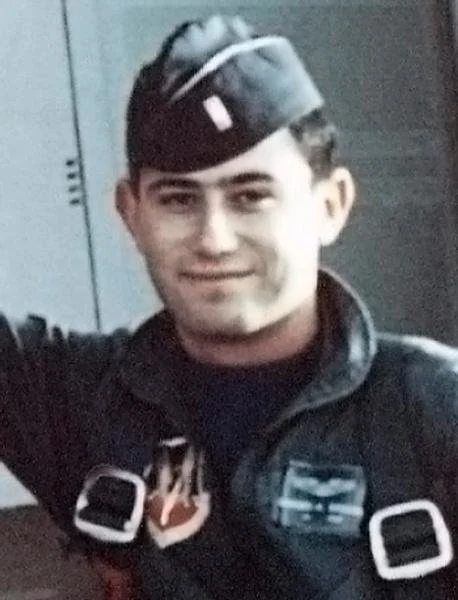
- Born: June 4, 1940; Quincy, Massachusetts, U.S.
- Died: June 3, 1973 (aged 32); Harrison, New York, U.S.
- Burial place: Arlington National Cemetery
- Military career
- Branch: United States Air Force
- Service years: 1963–1973
- Rank: Captain
- Unit: 68th Tactical Fighter Squadron
- Conflicts: Vietnam War (POW)
- Awards: Silver Star (2); Legion of Merit; Distinguished Flying Cross; Bronze Star (2); Purple Heart (2); Air Medal

Edward Alan Brudno (June 4, 1940 – June 3, 1973) was a United States Air Force captain. During the Vietnam War, Brudno was shot down during a mission and was kept as a prisoner of war in Hanoi for close to eight years, becoming one of the longest-held American prisoners of war.

== Early life ==
Brudno was born on June 4, 1940, in Quincy, Massachusetts, to a Jewish family. He graduated from North Quincy High School in 1958 and then attended Massachusetts Institute of Technology, where he graduated with a degree in aerospace engineering in 1963.

== Military career ==
Upon graduation from MIT, Brudno enlisted in the United States Air Force in February 1963 through the ROTC program in MIT. He then completed Undergraduate Pilot Training, earning his pilot wings at Craig Air Force Base in Alabama, in May 1964, before undertaking F-4C Phantom II Combat Crew Training and Pilot Systems Operator training in November 1964. Following the completion of the training, he was assigned to the 68th Tactical Fighter Squadron of the 8th Tactical Fighter Wing at George Air Force Base in California, in December 1964.

=== Vietnam War and POW ===
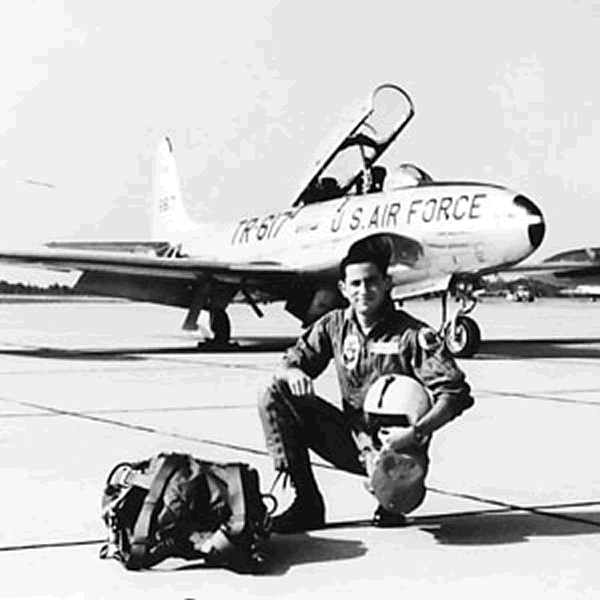
Brudno in front of a T-33 Shooting Star

In August 1965, the 68th TFS was deployed to Southeast Asia where it was assigned to the 6234th Tactical Fighter Wing (Provisional) at Korat Royal Thai Air Force Base in Thailand. On October 18, 1965, flying his 33rd mission, First Lieutenant Brudno was serving as copilot aboard an F-4C Phantom II with pilot Captain Thomas E. Collins, during a mission against a bridge near Hà Tĩnh in North Vietnam. Their aircraft was hit by heavy antiaircraft fire as Collins rolled in for attack, leaving it uncontrollable. Both airmen successfully ejected but were immediately captured by North Vietnamese forces.

His family did not learn he was alive until 10 February 1966, after he had already spent months in captivity that would total 89 months. In July 1966, he was forced to march through downtown Hanoi with 51 other handcuffed American POWs under bayoneted guard, while crowds assaulted them during what became known internationally as the "Hanoi March", drawing global attention to their mistreatment. Brudno was eventually coerced into writing a confession when his handcuffs were tightened into his wrists, triggering severe depression. Despite punishment, he found ways to communicate with fellow prisoners and later taught them subjects such as math and physics. Fellow POWs consistently praised his intelligence, with Paul Galanti calling Brudno one of the smartest men he had ever known.

He was imprisoned at Sơn Tây prison camp, a camp later selected by President Richard Nixon for a covert rescue attempt in November 1970. By the time the operation took place, however, the prisoners had already been transferred elsewhere nearly five months earlier. By 1972, Brudno had been moved again, this time to a facility the Americans nicknamed 'Dogpatch', located close to the China–Vietnam border. One day while shaving, he secretly took a razor blade and told Lt. Col. Elmo Baker that he was considering ending his life. Recognising the severity of his mental state, Baker remained with him and worked to lift him out of despair. Letters Brudno sent home revealed sharp emotional fluctuations, which his family quickly noticed. He was clearly suffering from what would now be recognised as severe post-traumatic stress, yet upon his return, there was little awareness or support to address it at that time.

On February 12, 1973, Brudno was released in Hanoi by the North Vietnamese along with numerous other American POWs during Operation Homecoming. He had spent over 2,675 days in captivity.

== Later life ==
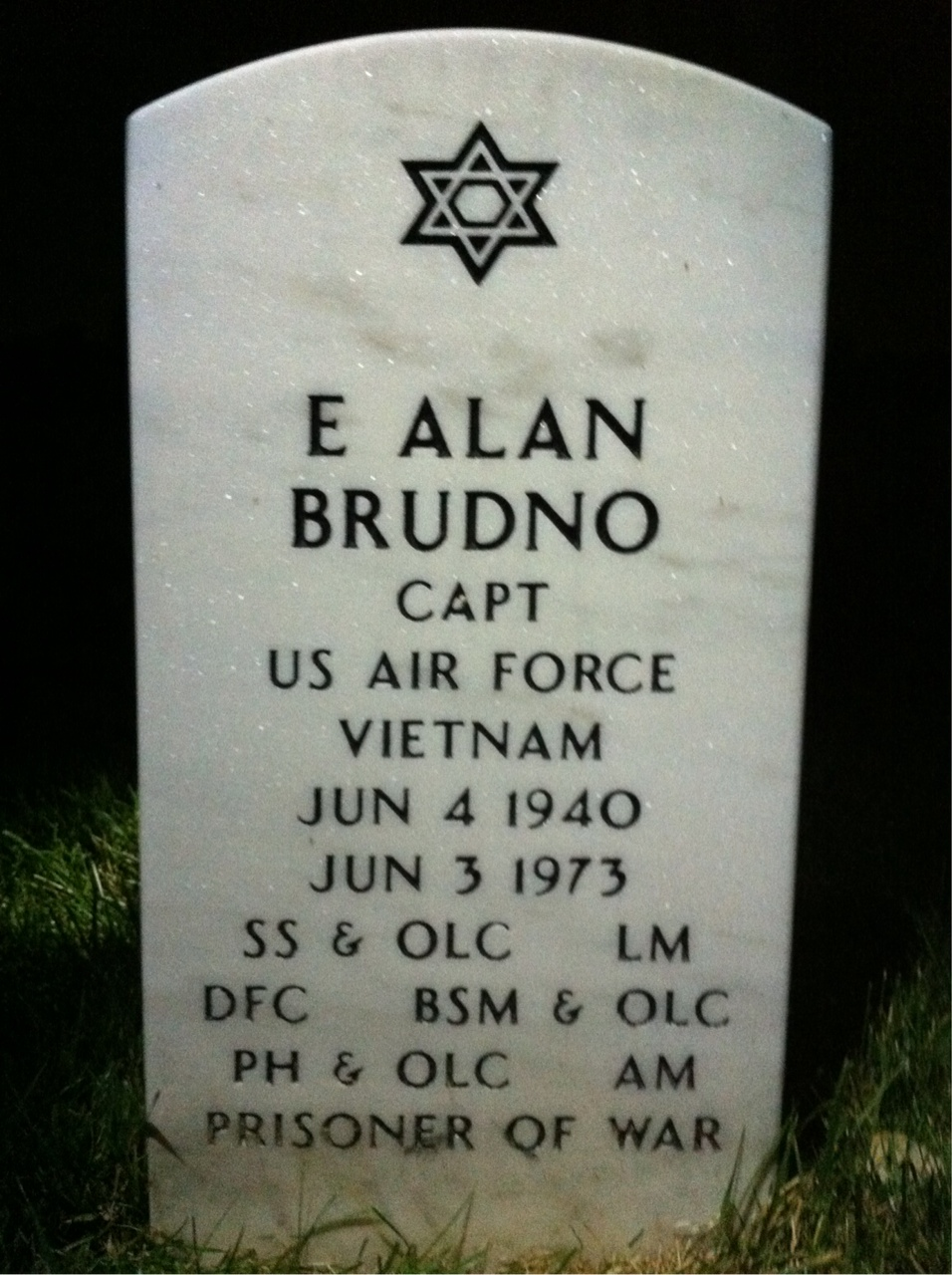
Brudno's grave at Arlington National Cemetery

After his return, Brudno initially displayed relief and optimism, but within weeks he began to experience severe depression. He struggled to adjust to civilian life after nearly eight years of captivity and was deeply affected by the time lost during his imprisonment. Those close to him observed significant emotional changes, and he reported feelings of isolation and difficulty reintegrating into family life. Despite seeking psychiatric treatment, his mental health continued to deteriorate. On June 3, 1973, approximately four months after his repatriation and a day before his 33rd birthday, Brudno died by suicide at his wife's family home in Harrison, New York. He was buried at Arlington National Cemetery.

== Awards and honors ==
His decorations include:

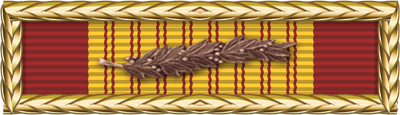

United States Air Force Pilot Badge
Silver Star with bronze oak leaf cluster
Legion of Merit	Distinguished Flying Cross with Valor device	Bronze Star Medal with Valor device and bronze oak leaf cluster
Purple Heart with bronze oak leaf cluster	Air Medal	Air Force Presidential Unit Citation
Prisoner of War Medal (Note: In 1985, this medal was awarded retroactively to all U.S. military personnel who had been prisoners of war.)	National Defense Service Medal	Vietnam Service Medal with three silver campaign stars
Air Force Longevity Service Award with bronze oak leaf cluster	Republic of Vietnam Gallantry Cross Unit Citation	Vietnam Campaign Medal

=== Vietnam Veterans Memorial inclusion ===
At the time, his suicide was classified as unrelated to combat wounds, resulting in his exclusion from the Vietnam Veterans Memorial. Under the memorial's original criteria, only servicemembers killed in Vietnam or those who later died from physical wounds sustained in the war were eligible for inclusion. Decades later, Brudno's family, led by his brother Robert Brudno, advocated for his inclusion, arguing that his death was the direct result of the psychological and physical wounds he suffered as a prisoner. The case prompted debate within the Vietnam Veterans Memorial Fund. Jan C. Scruggs, then president of the fund, initially expressed concern that including Brudno could set a precedent for adding the names of other veterans who died by suicide after the war. Following an Air Force recommendation and review of Brudno's case, the U.S. Department of Defense officially approved the addition of his name to the memorial in 2004, ruling that his 1973 suicide was a direct result of wartime injuries. The Pentagon emphasized that Brudno's case was unique and should not be interpreted as a precedent for broadly including postwar suicides. Brudno's inclusion in the memorial occurred alongside six other names, at a ceremony planned on Memorial Day.
