= Charles G. Boyd =

United States Air Force general (1938–2022)

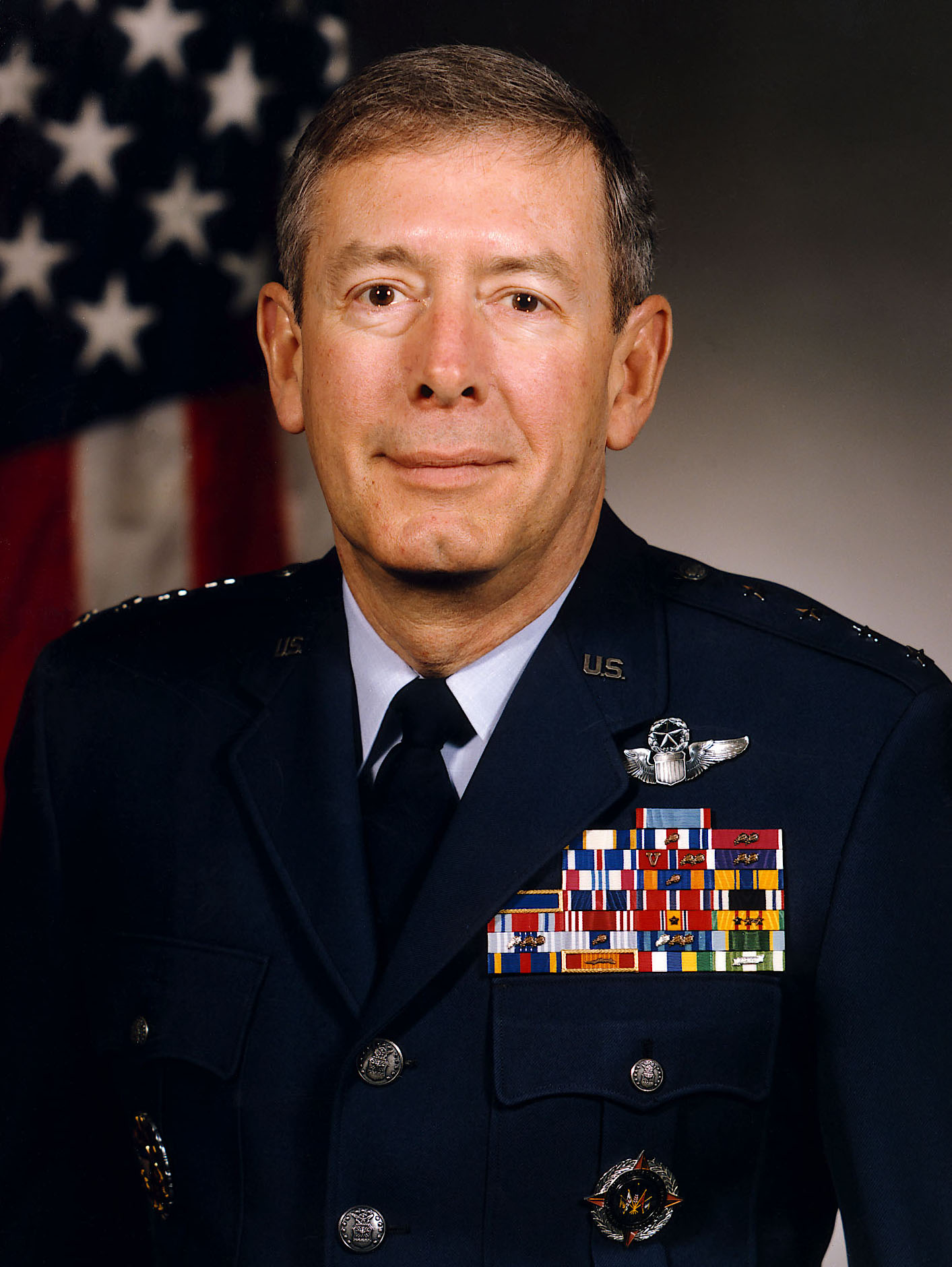
- Boyd in the 1990s
- Born: April 15, 1938 near Rockwell City, Iowa, U.S.
- Died: March 23, 2022 (aged 83); Haymarket, Virginia, U.S.
- Burial place: Arlington National Cemetery
- Spouses: Millicent Sample (m. 1961; died 1994) Jessica Mathews (m. 2005)
- Military career
- Allegiance: United States
- Branch: United States Air Force
- Service years: 1959–1995
- Rank: General
- Nickname: Chuck
- Commands: Air University
- Conflicts: Vietnam War
- Awards: Air Force Cross; Air Force Distinguished Service Medal; Silver Star (2); Legion of Merit (3); Distinguished Flying Cross; Bronze Star Medal with "V" device (3); Purple Heart (3)
- Other work: Council on Foreign Relations; Business Executives for National Security

Charles Graham "Chuck" Boyd (April 15, 1938 – March 23, 2022) was a four-star general of the United States Air Force. Boyd was a highly decorated combat pilot who served in Vietnam and is the only Vietnam War prisoner of war (1966–1973) to reach the four-star rank (1992). His final Air Force assignment was as deputy commander in chief, U.S. European Command, Stuttgart-Vaihingen, Germany. He retired from the Air Force in 1995 and remained active in the national security realm, including as a program director of the Council on Foreign Relations and as president of Business Executives for National Security. He was a member of the guiding coalition of the Project on National Security Reform.

== Early life and education ==
Charles Graham Boyd was born on April 15, 1938, near Rockwell City, Iowa. He entered the United States Air Force in April 1959.

Boyd received his Bachelor of Arts degree from the University of Kansas in 1975, and earned his Master of Arts degree from the same in 1976. His military education included attending the Air War College at Maxwell Air Force Base in Alabama in 1977. In 1986, he participated in the Program for Senior Executives in National and International Security at Harvard University.

== Air Force career ==
Boyd was commissioned as a second lieutenant through the aviation cadet program in July 1960 and served in a variety of assignments in Europe, the Pacific, and the Continental United States. A command pilot, with over 2,400 flight hours, he flew F-100s and F-105s in Southeast Asia during the Vietnam War. He was shot down on April 22, 1966, while on his 105th mission. From 1966 to 1973 (2,488 days), he was a prisoner of war, interned in various prisons in North Vietnam. During his captivity, Boyd was one of 52 Americans forced to participate in the Hanoi March, a propaganda event held in July 1966 in which U.S. prisoners of war were marched through the streets of Hanoi and brutally beaten by North Vietnamese civilians. He was released on February 12, 1973, as a part of Operation Homecoming. In a 2019 oral history interview with the Association for Diplomatic Studies and Training, Boyd reflected on the harshness of his captivity.

It was particularly rough going for the first few years. Torture aside, I was colder, hotter and hungrier in North Vietnam than I have ever been in my life. I remember huddling in thin, cotton, pajama-like clothing, and only slightly thicker cotton blankets, with my cellmate trying to share body heat. It’s one thing to get cold then go inside to warm up, and something completely different to stay cold for months on end. I remember lying naked except for shorts on my wooden plank bed, inside a steel roofed cell block, with no windows, covered with heat rash, sweating continuously. When flies would land on me, I would hesitate to brush them off, thus exerting energy which I thought would make me hotter. Hunger was a constant. What food there was ranged from disgusting to barely edible. At times, we received so little that prisoners began to contract acute malnutrition diseases. A period of my life best forgotten.

Boyd was vice commander of Strategic Air Command's 8th Air Force, director of plans at Headquarters U.S. Air Force, Washington, D.C., and commander of Air University, with headquarters at Maxwell Air Force Base, Alabama, before becoming deputy commander in chief, U.S. European Command, Stuttgart-Vaihingen, Germany, which was his final assignment.

His Air Force assignments include:

- April 1959 – July 1960, student, undergraduate pilot training, Aviation Cadet Program, Greenville Air Force Base, Mississippi
- July 1960 – January 1961, student, F-100 combat crew training, Luke Air Force Base, Arizona, and Nellis Air Force Base, Nevada
- July 1961 – October 1963, F-100 fighter pilot, 510th Tactical Fighter Squadron, Clark Air Base, Republic of the Philippines
- October 1963 – August 1964, F-105 fighter pilot, 355th Tactical Fighter Wing, George Air Force Base, California
- August 1964 – November 1965, F-105 fighter pilot, 355th Tactical Fighter Wing, McConnell Air Force Base, Kansas
- November 1965 – April 1966, F-105 fighter pilot, 388th Tactical Fighter Wing, Royal Thai Air Force Base, Thailand
- April 1966 – February 1973, interned in various prisons throughout North Vietnam
- February 1973 – August 1973, repatriation orientation
- August 1973 – June 1975, undergraduate student, Air Force Institute of Technology, University of Kansas
- June 1975 – June 1976, graduate student, Air Force Institute of Technology, University of Kansas
- August 1976 – May 1977, student, Air War College, Maxwell Air Force Base, Alabama
- June 1977 – June 1979, special assistant to the chief of staff, Allied Forces Southern Europe, and executive officer to the chief of staff, Allied Air Forces, Southern Europe, Naples, Italy
- June 1979 – September 1980, chief of Western Hemisphere Division, Directorate of Plans, Headquarters U.S. Air Force, Washington, D.C.
- September 1980 – June 1982, deputy assistant director for Joint and National Security Council matters, Headquarters U.S. Air Force, Washington, D.C.
- June 1982 – July 1984, assistant director for Joint and National Security Council matters, Headquarters U.S. Air Force
- July 1984 – December 1986, deputy chief of staff for plans and programs, Headquarters U.S. Air Forces in Europe, Ramstein Air Base, West Germany. BGen Boyd played a major role in the deployment of Ground Launch Cruise Missiles in NATO.
- December 1986 – June 1988, vice commander of 8th Air Force, Barksdale Air Force Base, Louisiana
- June 1988 – August 1989, director of plans, Office of the Deputy Chief of Staff, Plans and Operations, Headquarters U.S. Air Force, Washington, D.C.
- August 1989 – January 1990, assistant deputy chief of staff for plans and operations, Headquarters U.S. Air Force, Washington, D.C.
- January 1990 – October 1992, commander of Air University, Maxwell Air Force Base, Alabama
- October 1992 – August 1995, deputy commander in chief, U.S. European Command, Stuttgart-Vaihingen, Germany

His promotions and dates of rank are:

Dates of Rank
Insignia	Rank	Date
	2nd Lt	July 22, 1960
	1st Lt	January 22, 1962
	Capt	January 22, 1965
	Maj	December 1, 1970 (promoted to major while a prisoner of war in Vietnam)
	Lt Col	May 1, 1975
	Col	December 1, 1979
	Brig Gen	April 1, 1985
	Maj Gen	November 1, 1987
	Lt Gen	January 3, 1990
	Gen	December 1, 1992 (Boyd is the only Vietnam War POW to reach the four-star rank)

== Family ==
His second wife is Jessica Tuchman Mathews, former president of the Carnegie Endowment for International Peace. Boyd's first wife, Millicent Ann Sample (23 April 1938 – 11 April 1994) is buried in Arlington National Cemetery. Boyd and Sample had two children, Jessica Marie and Dallas Graham Boyd.

== Post-military career and death ==
Following his retirement from the Air Force in 1995, Boyd served as strategy consultant to Speaker of the United States House of Representatives, Newt Gingrich. From July 1998 he was executive director of the U.S. Commission on National Security for the 21st Century, whose final report in January 2001 predicted a growing threat to the United States from terrorism. He has also served as senior vice president and Washington program director of the Council on Foreign Relations.

From May 1, 2002, until December 31, 2009, he was the president and CEO of Business Executives for National Security (BENS), a national security public interest group. From December 14–17, 2009, Boyd led a delegation from BENS to Pyongyang, North Korea, to discuss economic issues with officials from the Democratic People's Republic of Korea government. Boyd remained involved with BENS as a member of the board of directors.

He was a member of the board of directors at defense electronics firm, DRS Technologies; graphics software firm, Forterra Systems; and venture capitalists In-Q-Tel, who support the work of the Central Intelligence Agency.

Boyd endorsed Joe Biden in the 2020 United States presidential election, the first candidate he had publicly ever endorsed. He died at the age of 83 on March 23, 2022, from lung cancer in Haymarket, Virginia. He was buried with full military honors next to his first wife, Millicent Sample Boyd, at Arlington National Cemetery.

== Military awards and decorations ==
Boyd's major military awards and decorations include:

Badge	U.S. Air Force Command Pilot Badge			
1st Row	Air Force Cross		Air Force Distinguished Service Medal	
2nd Row	Silver Star with 1 bronze Oak leaf cluster	Legion of Merit with 2 bronze Oak leaf clusters	Distinguished Flying Cross	Bronze Star with "V" device and 2 bronze Oak leaf clusters
3rd Row	Purple Heart with 2 bronze Oak leaf clusters	Defense Meritorious Service Medal	Air Medal with 1 bronze Oak leaf cluster	Air Force Commendation Medal with 1 bronze Oak leaf cluster
4th Row	U.S. Air Force Presidential Unit Citation	Air Force Outstanding Unit Award	Air Force Organizational Excellence Award	Prisoner of War Medal
5th Row	Combat Readiness Medal	Army Good Conduct Medal	National Defense Service Medal with 1 Service Star	Vietnam Service Medal with 3 bronze Campaign stars
6th Row	Air Force Overseas Short Tour Service Ribbon with 1 silver and 2 bronze Oak leaf clusters	Air Force Overseas Long Tour Service Ribbon with 1 bronze Oak leaf cluster	Air Force Longevity Service Award with 1 silver and 2 bronze Oak leaf clusters	Small Arms Expert Marksmanship Ribbon
7th Row	Air Force Training Ribbon	Vietnam Gallantry Cross Unit Citation with Palm and Frame	Inter-American Defense Board Medal	Vietnam Campaign Medal with "60-" clasp
Badges	Joint Chiefs of Staff Identification Badge		United States European Command Badge	

=== Air Force Cross citation ===
Boyd, Charles G.
Captain, U.S. Air Force
421st Tactical Fighter Squadron, 388th Tactical Fighter Wing, Korat Royal Thai Air Base, Thailand
Date of Action: 22 April 1966

The President of the United States of America, authorized by Title 10, Section 8742, United States Code, takes pleasure in presenting the Air Force Cross to Captain Charles Graham Boyd, United States Air Force, for extraordinary heroism in connection with military operations against an opposing armed force as a combat strike pilot of an F-105D Thunderchief of the 421st Tactical Fighter Squadron, 388th Tactical Fighter Wing, Korat Royal Thai Air Base, Thailand, in action approximately 35 miles northwest of Hanoi, North Vietnam, on 22 April 1966. On that date, Captain Boyd volunteered to participate in a flight with the mission of destroying Surface to Air Missile (SAM) Sites posing a threat to flights striking a bridge in the Phu Tho area. While attacking a hostile SAM site, Captain Boyd saw two missiles streak toward his aircraft. His superb airmanship and instant reaction enabled him to evade the missiles, which burst very near his aircraft. Without hesitation, Captain Boyd continued the attack on the hostile missile site. As he made a second pass through the intense flak which filled the sky around him, Captain Boyd's aircraft received a direct hit by anti-aircraft fire and he was forced to eject himself in a heavily populated, hostile area. The selfless act of making repeated attacks through intense ground fire after barely avoiding two missiles was far beyond the normal call of duty. Through his extraordinary heroism, superb airmanship, and aggressiveness in the face of hostile forces, Captain Boyd reflected the highest credit upon himself and the United States Air Force.

== See also ==
- List of United States Air Force four-star generals
- Hanoi March
- United States prisoners of war during the Vietnam War
