= Robert H. Shumaker =

U.S. Navy rear admiral and Vietnam War POW

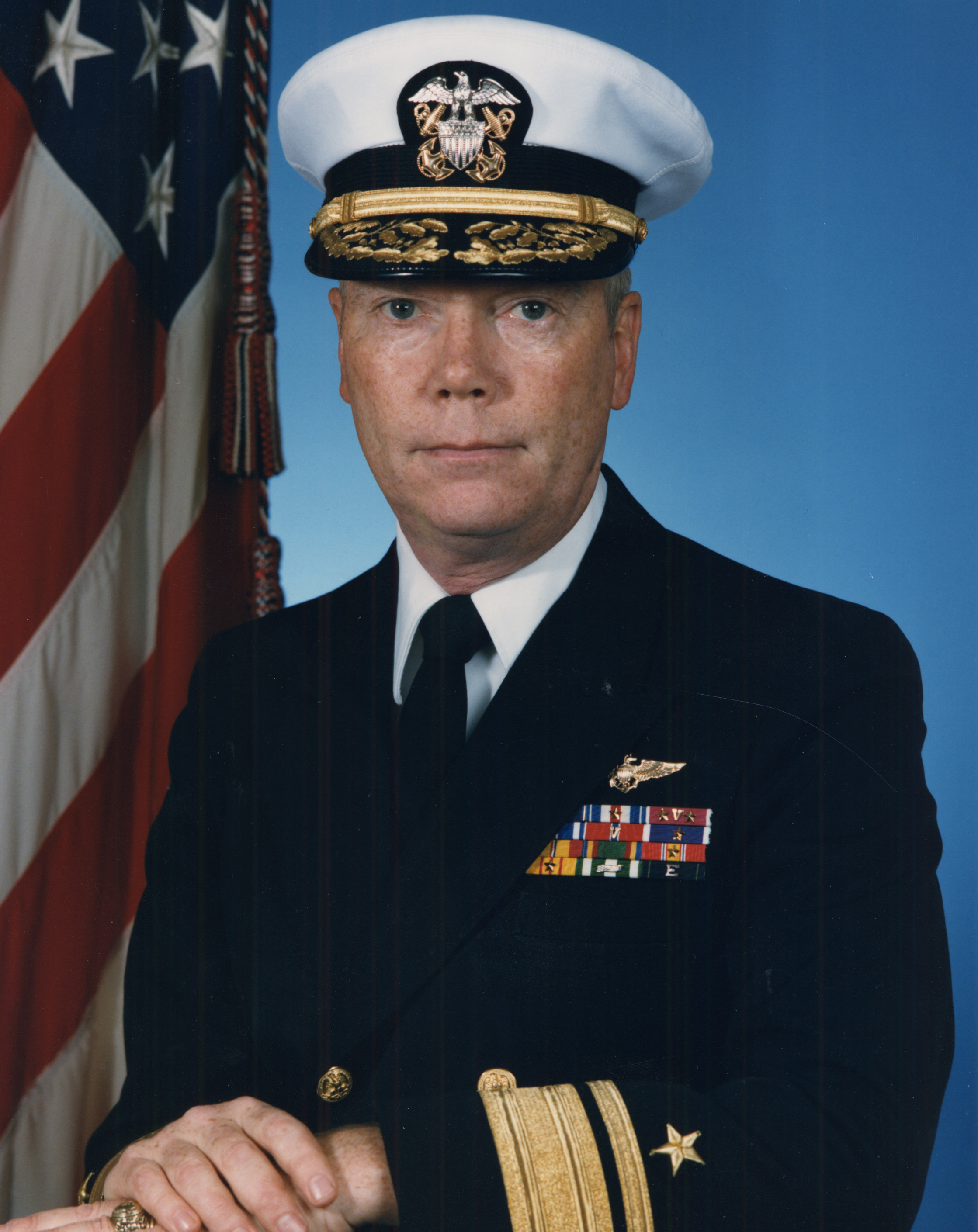
- Born: May 11, 1933 (age 93); New Castle, Pennsylvania, U.S.
- Military career
- Allegiance: United States
- Branch: United States Navy
- Service years: 1956–1988
- Rank: Rear Admiral
- Nickname: Bob
- Commands: Naval Postgraduate School
- Conflicts: Vietnam War
- Awards: Navy Distinguished Service Medal; Silver Star (2); Legion of Merit with "V" (4); Distinguished Flying Cross; Bronze Star Medal with "V"; Purple Heart (2)

Robert Harper Shumaker (born May 11, 1933) is a retired rear admiral and naval aviator in the United States Navy. He spent eight years and one day as a prisoner of war (POW) in North Vietnam. He notably coined the term "Hanoi Hilton” for the notorious Hỏa Lò Prison.

== Early life ==
Shumaker was born on May 11, 1933, at New Castle, Pennsylvania. His father Alvah was a lawyer and his mother Eleanor was a writer. He attended Northwestern University for a year and then the United States Naval Academy, graduating with a Bachelor of Science degree in 1956.

== Military career ==
After graduating from the U.S. Naval Academy, Shumaker then completed flight training, earning his designation as a Naval Aviator in January 1958. After flight training, Shumaker eventually joined VF-32, a fighter squadron in Jacksonville, Florida. He was a finalist in the Apollo astronaut selection, but a temporary physical ailment prevented his selection in 1963.

Shumaker graduated from the U.S. Naval Postgraduate School with a Master of Science degree in aeronautical engineering. Shumaker joined VF-154 in San Diego.

=== Vietnam War and capture ===
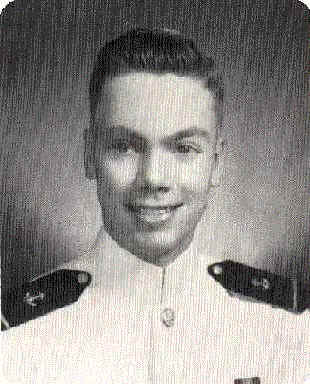
Midshipman Shumaker

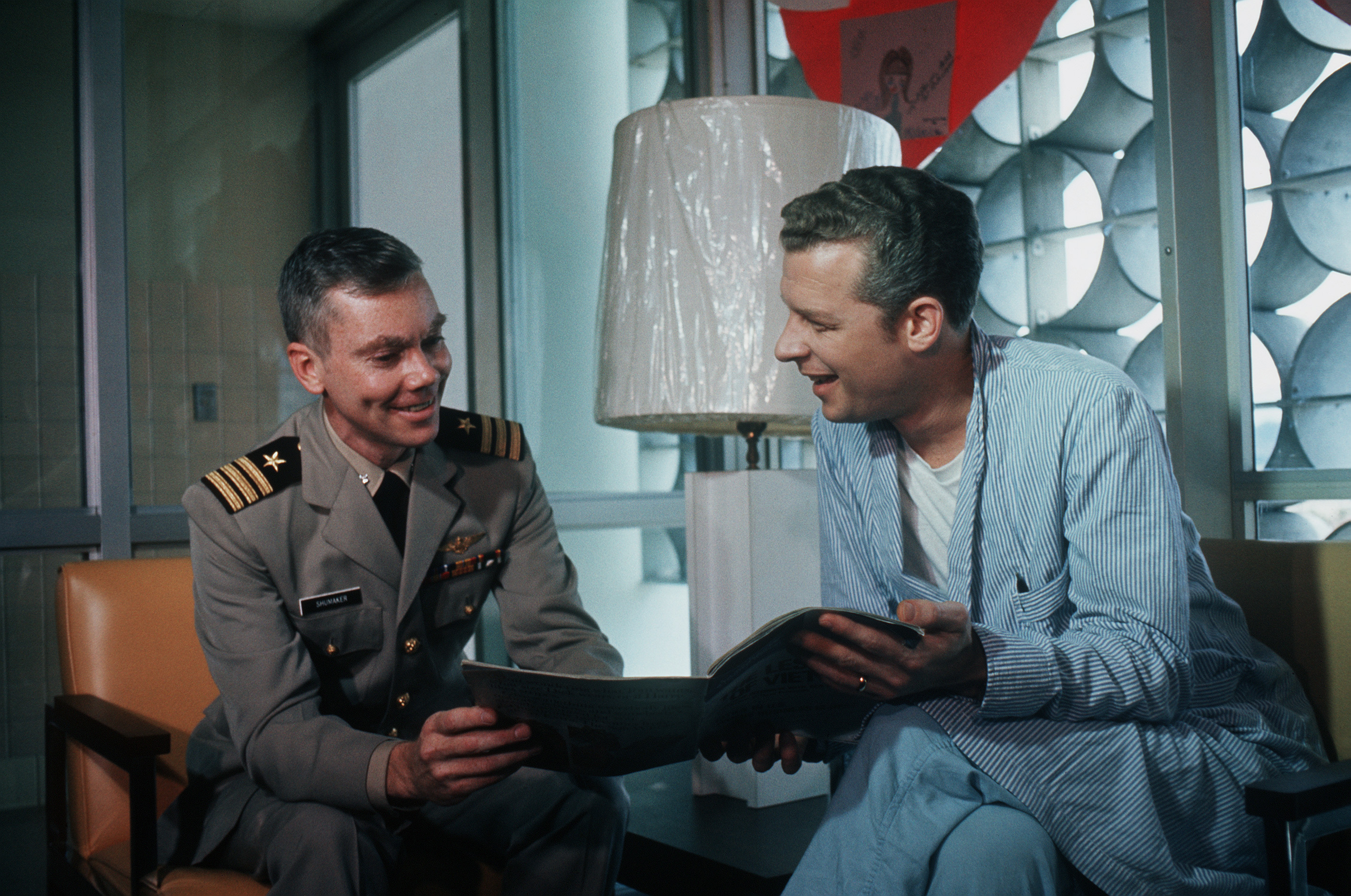
Commander Robert Shumaker meeting with Lieutenant Commander Phillip N. Butler following their release as POWs

Lieutenant Commander Shumaker was an F-8D pilot assigned to VF-154 on board the carrier USS Coral Sea. Shumaker's aircraft, a F-8 fighter, was shot down by 37mm cannon fire on February 11, 1965, in the province of Quang Binh. His parachute opened a mere 35 feet (11 m) from the ground, and he was captured by the North Vietnamese. He was the second navy aviator to be captured, following Everett Alvarez Jr the previous year. The impact broke Shumaker's back and he was first frogmarched through the countryside, at which time his photograph was taken by acclaimed Vietnamese War photographer Van Bao. He was then placed in a jeep and transported over the rutted roads to Hanoi. Upon arrival in Hanoi, a white-smocked North Vietnamese gave him a cursory examination before dozens of photographers yet did not give him any medical attention. His back healed itself, but it was six months before he could bend.

For the next eight years, Shumaker was held in various prisoner of war camps, including the infamous Hỏa Lò Prison in Hanoi dubbed the "Hanoi Hilton". Shumaker, as a prisoner, was known for devising all sorts of communications systems, including the notable tap code system and never getting caught. Like other POWs, he was badgered to write a request for amnesty from Ho Chi Minh, which he refused to do. As punishment, the Vietnamese forced Shumaker to stay in a cell with no heat and no blankets during the winter. After about a week, Shumaker had not relented, and he was forced to kneel for another week. Finally, he was kneeling on broom handles with boards on his shoulders. After a month the Vietnamese finally broke him and went on to the next POW.

Shumaker was released in Operation Homecoming on February 12, 1973. He had been promoted to the rank of commander during his captivity. His fellow POWs consider him as a resister, leader, and patriot.

=== Later career ===
Shumaker was hospitalised to recover from his injuries at Balboa Naval Hospital, from February to June 1973, and then attended the Naval Postgraduate School to complete his master's degree and PhD in electrical engineering from June 1973 to June 1977. Shumaker next served as a project manager for smart missiles with the Naval Air Systems Command at NAS Patuxent River, from June 1977 to June 1983, followed by service as superintendent of the Naval Postgraduate School from June 1983 to June 1986.

Shumaker's final assignment was as director of the Tactical Air, Surface & Electronic Warfare Development Division in the Office of the Chief of Naval Operations at the Pentagon from June 1986 until his retirement from the navy on February 1, 1988, at the rank of rear admiral.

== Later life ==
After retiring from the navy, Shumaker became an assistant dean at George Washington University and later became the associate dean of the Center for Aerospace Sciences at the University of North Dakota.

In April 2011 Shumaker was presented with the Distinguished Graduate Award from the United States Naval Academy.

== Awards and decorations ==
Shumaker's decorations include:

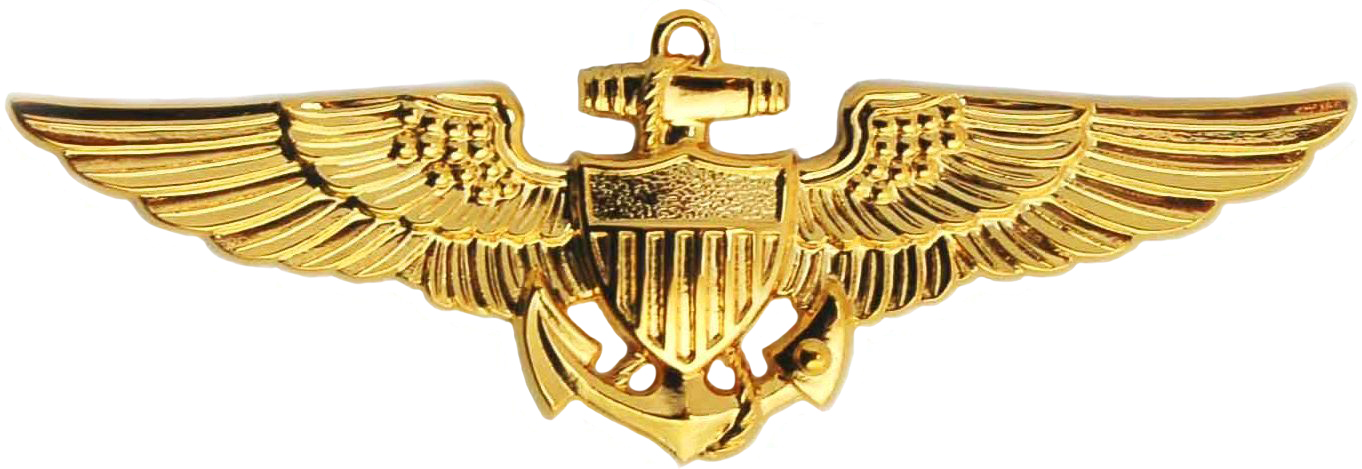

Naval Aviator Badge
Navy Distinguished Service Medal		Silver Star w/ one 5/16" Gold Star
Legion of Merit w/ Combat "V" and three 5/16" Gold stars	Distinguished Flying Cross	Bronze Star Medal w/ Combat "V"
Purple Heart w/ two 5/16" Gold Stars	Combat Action Ribbon	Navy Unit Commendation
Prisoner of War Medal	National Defense Service Medal w/ one 3/16" Bronze star	Vietnam Service Medal w/ three 3/16" Silver and one 3/16" Bronze star
Republic of Vietnam Gallantry Cross	Vietnam Campaign Medal	Navy Pistol Marksmanship Ribbon w/ 'E' device

== Personal life ==
Shumaker married Lorraine Shaw in 1963. They have one son Grant, who is a neurosurgeon in Dakota Dunes, South Dakota. Shumaker and his wife currently live in Fairfax Station, Virginia. He is the uncle of former Illinois Congressman Robert Dold.
