= Phillip N. Butler =

US POW in N. Vietnam for eight years, president Veterans for Peace

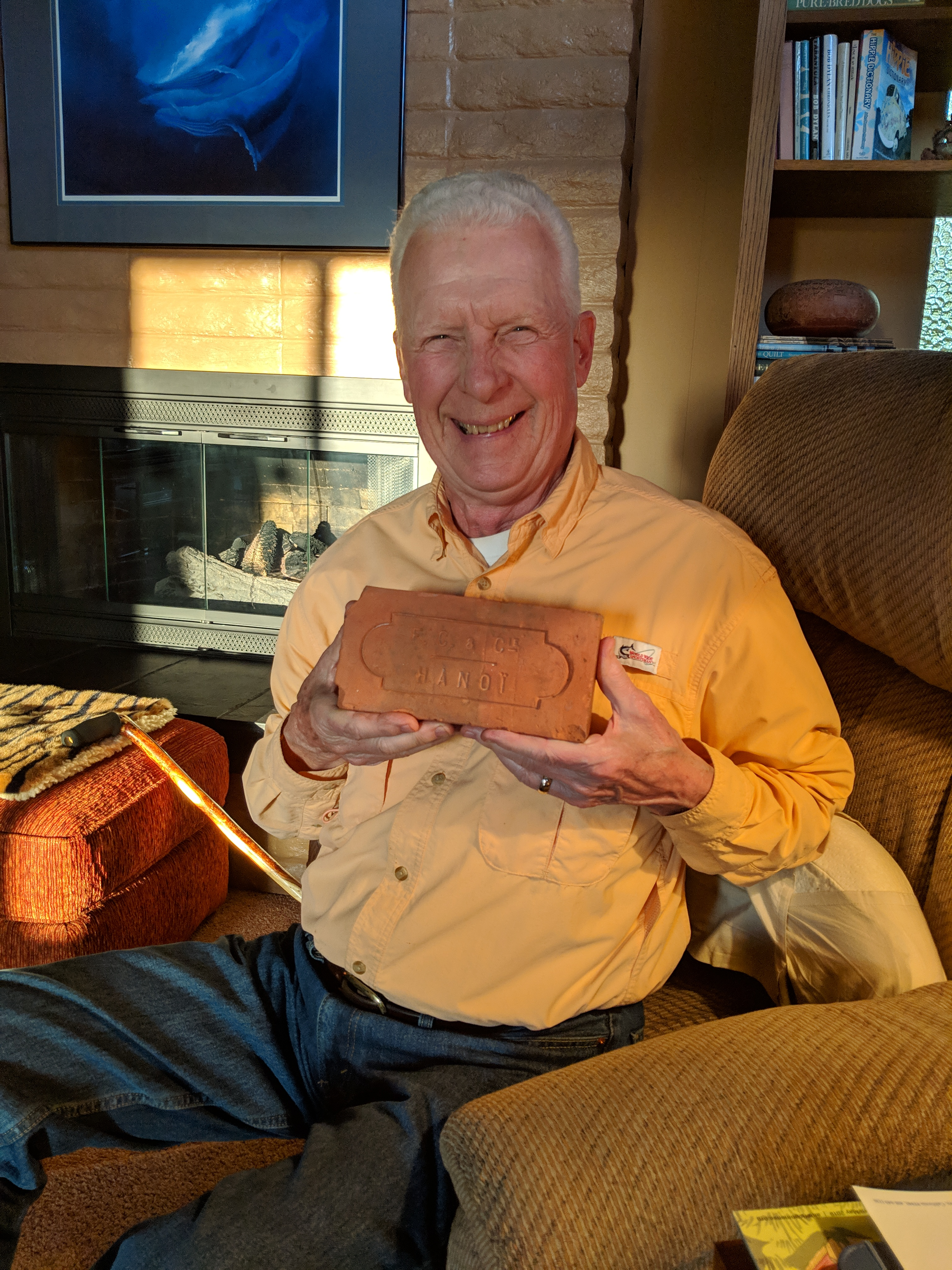
- Butler with brick from "Hanoi Hilton"
- Born: August 11, 1938 (age 88); Tulsa, Oklahoma, United States
- Military career
- Allegiance: United States
- Branch: United States Navy
- Service years: 1961–1981
- Rank: Commander
- Nickname: Phil
- Conflicts: Vietnam War
- Awards: Silver Star (2); Legion of Merit (2); Bronze Star Medal (2); Purple Heart (2)
- Other work: President of Veterans for Peace

Phillip Neal Butler (born August 11, 1938) is a retired United States Naval officer and pilot. He was the eighth-longest-held U.S. prisoner of war (POW) held in North Vietnam during the Vietnam War. Butler, who was forced to eject after a mid-air explosion on April 20, 1965, was a prisoner of war in North Vietnam until his release as part of Operation Homecoming in 1973. Butler was one of the five POWs (with Carlyle "Smitty" Harris, Hayden Lockhart, Robert Peel, and Robert H. Shumaker) credited with establishing the tap code. The code enabled the prisoners to communicate with each other.

After his release, Butler earned a PhD in sociology and used his communication skills to provide leadership training in military and civilian life. Butler provided community service as President of Veterans for Peace. In October 2019 Butler was inducted into the Oklahoma Military Hall of Fame.

== Early life ==
Phillip Neal Butler was born on August 11, 1938, in Tulsa, Oklahoma. He attended Lanier Elementary School, Wilson Jr. High School and Will Rogers High School, from which he graduated in Tulsa, Oklahoma. He logged enough flying hours to receive a commercial pilots license two months after his high school graduation. Butler attended the University of Oklahoma with a Naval Reserve Officers Training Corps (NROTC) scholarship and then accepted an appointment to the United States Naval Academy at Annapolis.

== Military career ==
=== Navy training and early career ===
Phillip Butler graduated with a Bachelor of Science degree in 1961 from the United States Naval Academy. Butler received his officer's commission and married Karen Olson the day after graduation. On assignment in Texas, Butler flew the single-seated fighter airplane, Grumman F-11 Tiger, during the Cuban Missile Crisis. Butler was assigned to Naval Air Station Lemoore in California.

=== Capture ===
During his second West Pacific cruise, on the night of April 20, 1965, Butler launched from the USS Midway in his A-4C Skyhawk. His mission was to fly from the Gulf of Tonkin to Highway 1, the major transportation route that the North Vietnamese used to carry military supplies to their troops in the south. The bombing run was at night because that was when the North Vietnamese moved material. According to Butler's report his aircraft exploded due to a malfunction of the electrically-fused Mark-81 VT experimental fuses on the 250-lb bombs.

After ejecting, he covered over 70 miles (110 km) in four days with nothing to eat or drink other than what he could find on the jungle floor. On the fourth day, the North Vietnamese, using dogs, were able to track him down and capture him. Butler went down near the North Vietnamese city of Vinh.

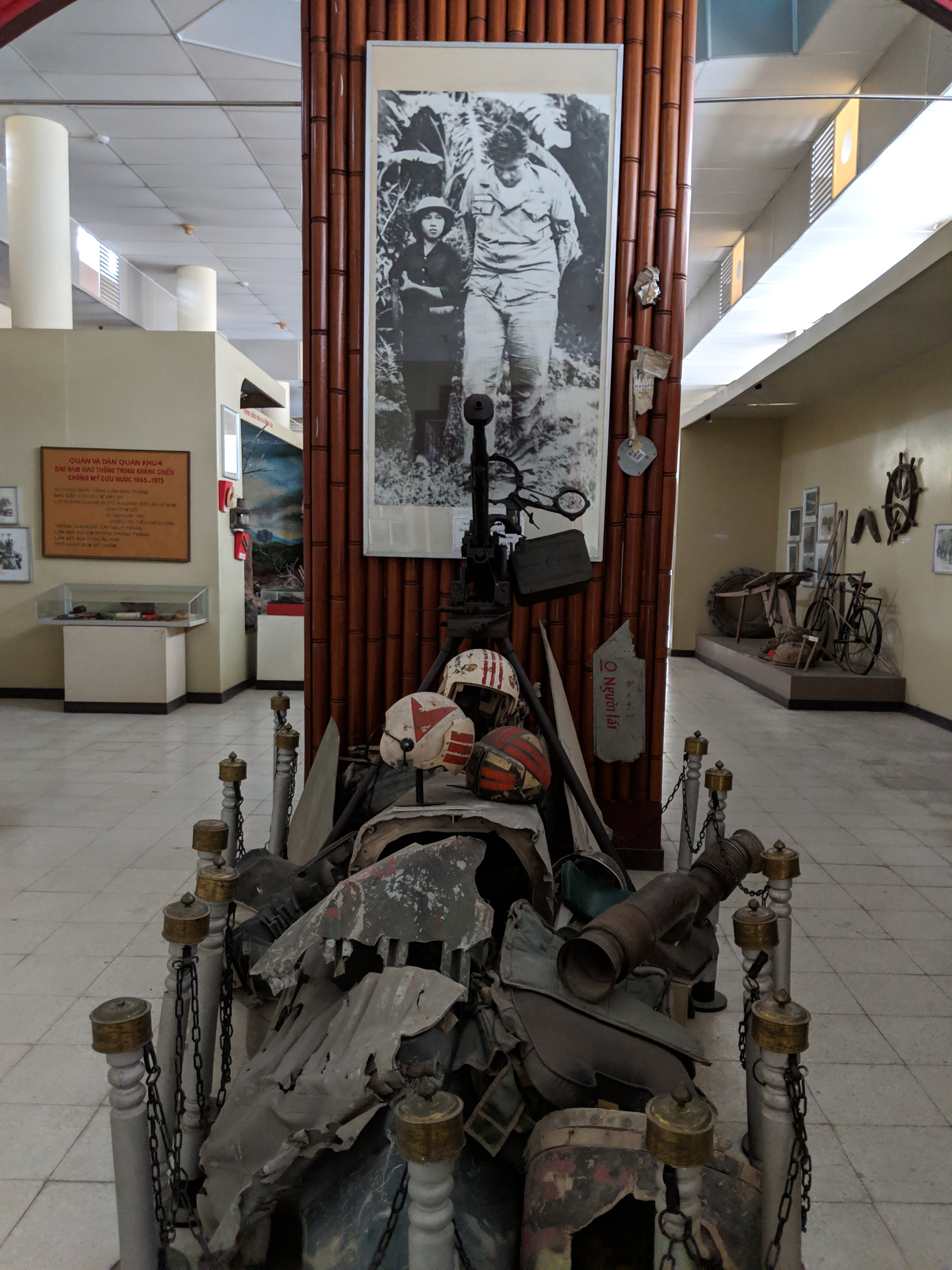
Image at Vinh city Military Museum show gear from downed US pilot captured during the Vietnam War.

Butler was moved around to ten different prisons in North Vietnam over the next seven years and ten months.

Butler was first reported missing and then mistakenly reported killed in action. The erroneous news of his death was published in his home town of Tulsa, Oklahoma.

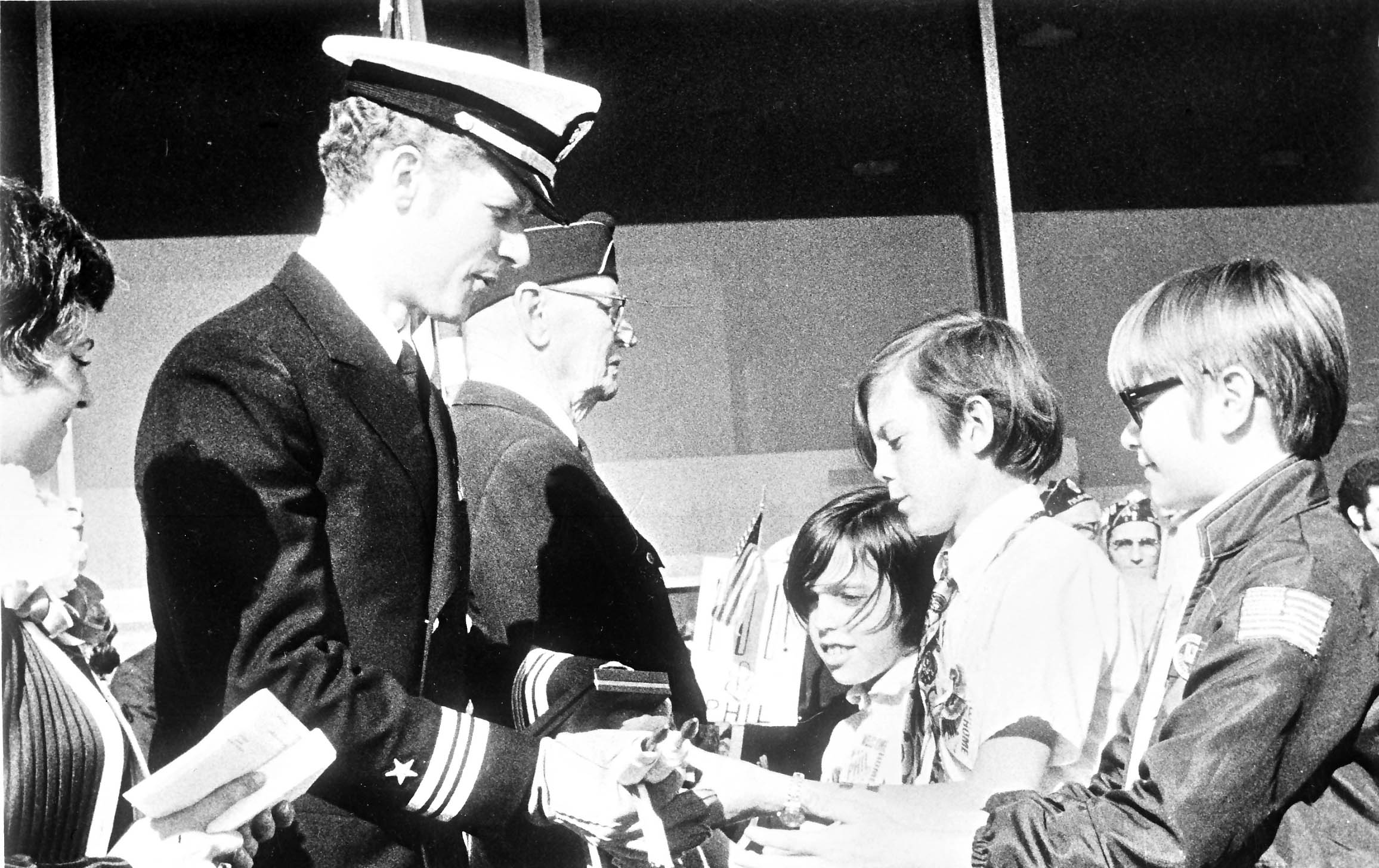
Phil Butler returns to Tulsa Oklahoma to greet his family

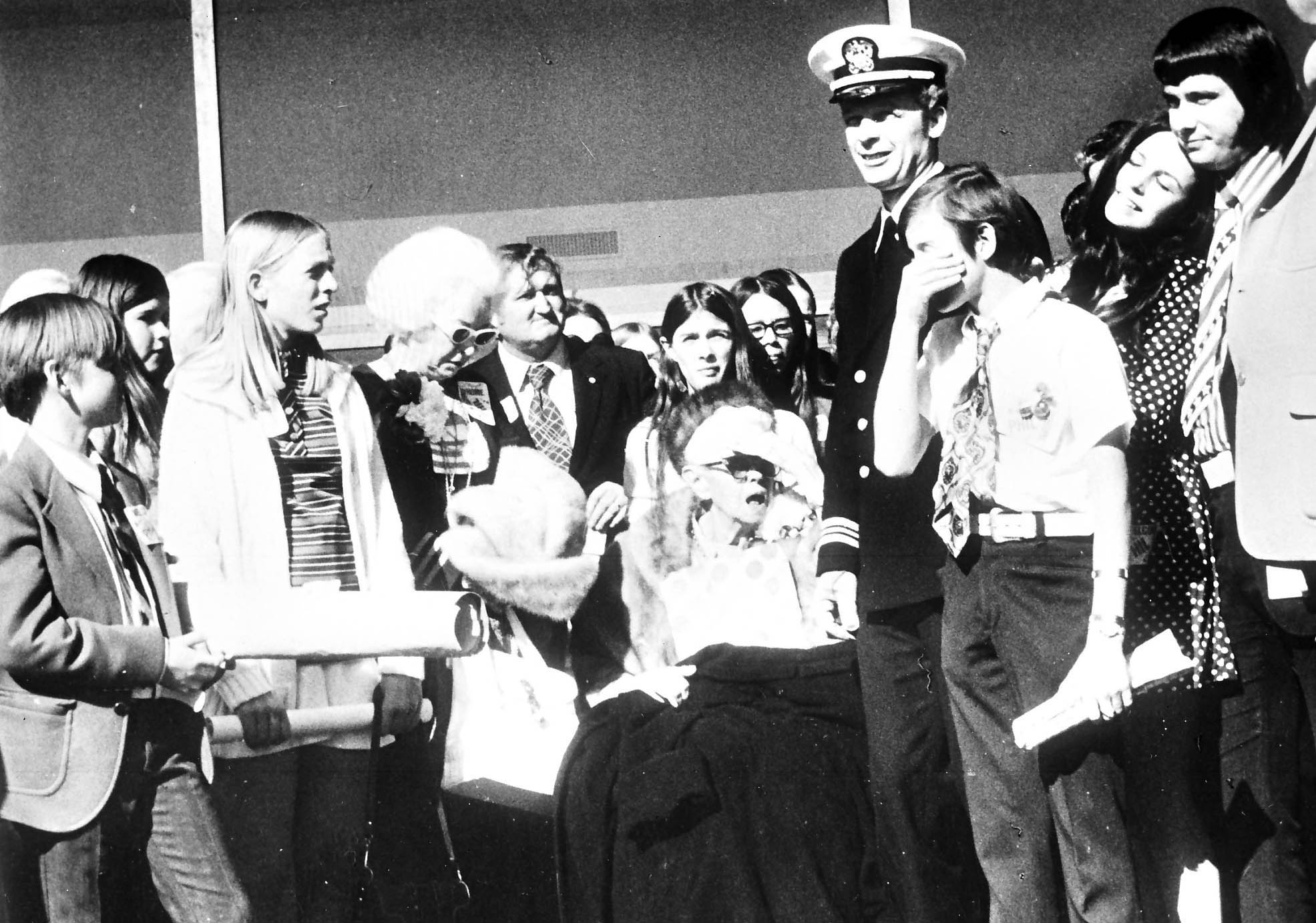
Lt. Cmdr. Phillip Butler's greeted by family including Grandmother Butler (wheel chair), Cousin John A. Howard (12 year old to his right)

In 1965 Butler was placed in the same cell with Carlyle "Smitty" Harris, Lieutenant Robert Peel and Robert H. Shumaker. Harris taught the others a special code that he had learned at a survival training. This tap code enabled the prisoners to communicate with quiet taps on the walls of the cells.

After the death of Ho Chi Minh in September 1969 the treatment of the US POWs improved.

=== After release ===
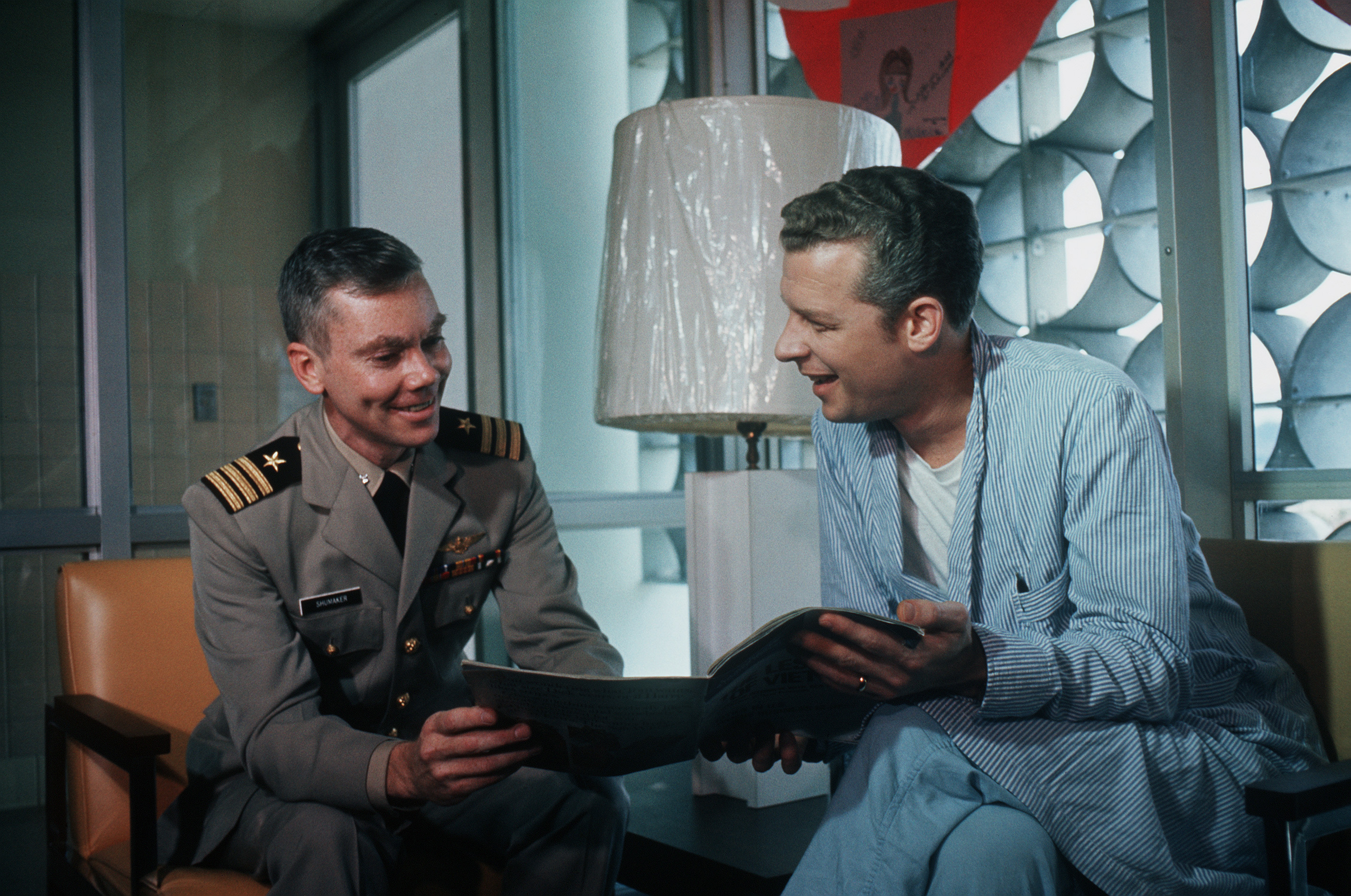
U.S. Navy Lieutenant Commander Philip Neal Butler meeting with U.S. Navy Commander Robert Harper Shumaker following their release as POWs

After recovery from his injuries and a difficult divorce Butler attended graduate school while in the Navy. Butler earned a Ph.D. in Sociology at UC San Diego and worked as a Navy Organizational Effectiveness consultant and a professor of management at the U.S. Naval Postgraduate School in Monterey, CA. Butler was promoted to the rank of Captain in October 1980 but he elected to retire early from the Navy as a Commander in June 1981.

=== Medals ===
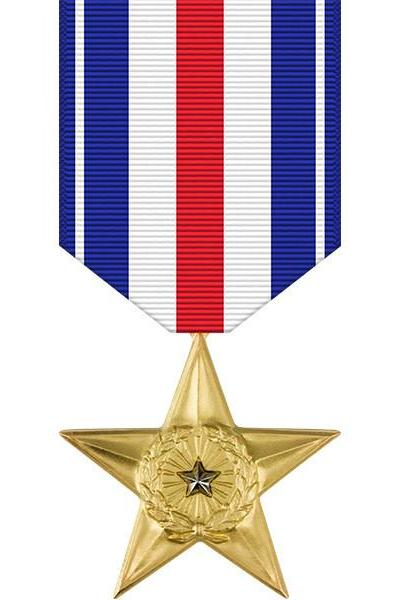
Silver Star medal award for courage

Prisoner of War medal

- Butler was awarded 2 Silver Stars (Silver Star Medal with Gold Star indicating two awards), In part it read ..." for conspicuous gallantry and intrepidity while interned as a Prisoner of War In North Vietnam. During the period May to July 1967 Commander Butler's captors, completely ignoring international agreements, subjected him to extreme mental and physical cruelties in an attempt to obtain military information or false confessions for propaganda purposes...by his determination, courage, resourcefulness and devotion to duty Commander Butler reflected great credit upon himself and upheld the highest tradition of the Naval Service and the US Armed Forces."
- Butler was awarded a Bronze Star with Combat Distinguishing Device and a Gold Star indicating two awards
- Purple Heart with Gold Star indicating 2 awards
- Two Legion of Merit awards "..for exceptionally meritorious conduct in the performance of outstanding services...while interned as a POW in North Vietnam..he performed duties involving highly classified material in an exemplary and professional manner. Through his zealousness and ingenuity, he generated new ideas and improvised techniques greatly enhancing covert operations.
- Navy Commendation Medal with Combat Distinguishing Device,
- Prisoner of War Medal.

=== Awards and honors ===
- Inducted into the Oklahoma Military Hall of Fame 2019
- Awarded Veteran of the Year by the Monterey County Board of Supervisors October 23, 2018
- Baha'i Human Rights Award 2019 presented at the United Nations human rights day celebration

== Civilian life ==
=== Business ===
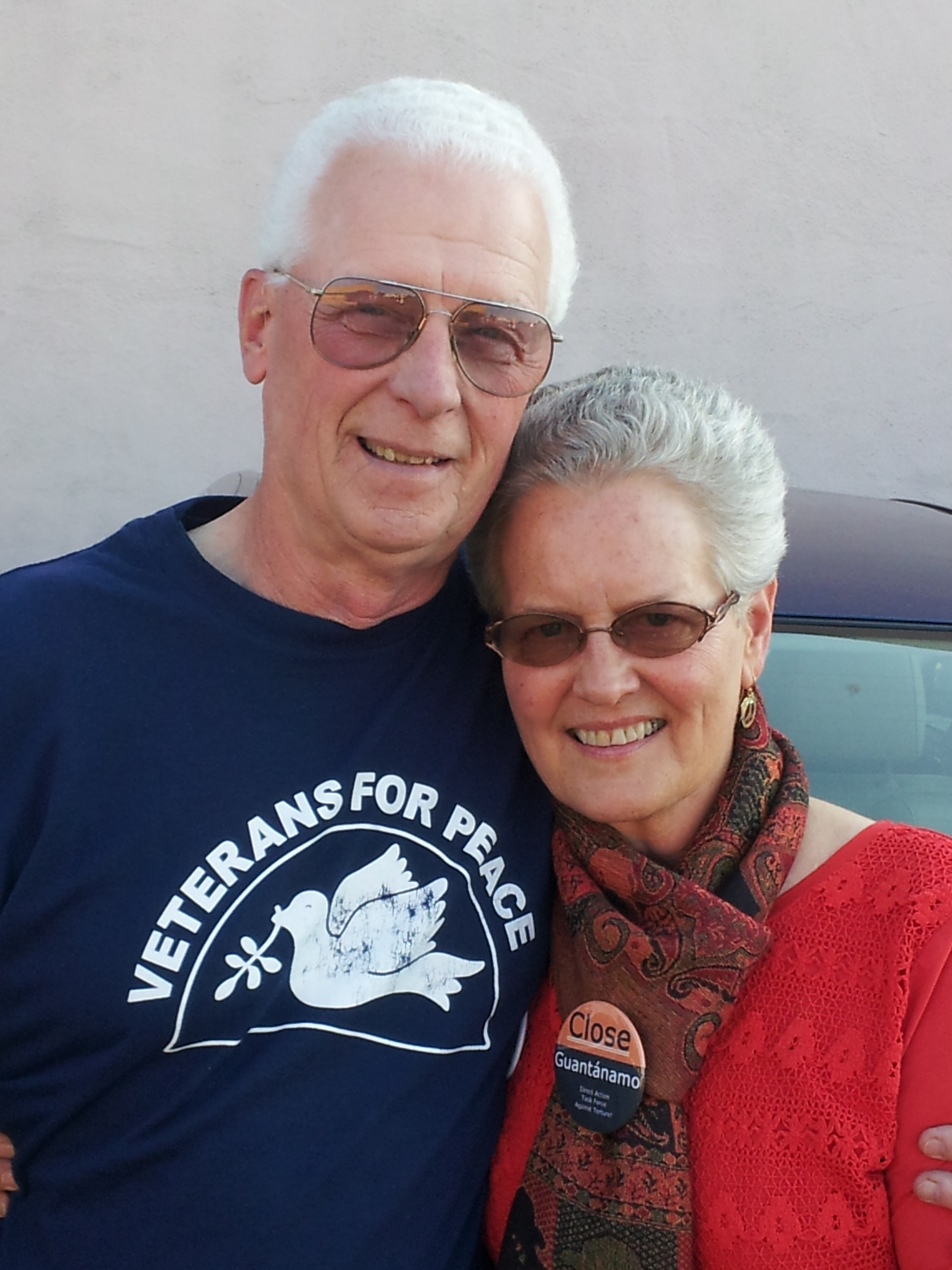
President of Veterans for Peace Phil Butler, and his wife Barbara

Butler had a consulting and management company, Camelot Enterprises 1981–2000, specializing in executive team building, interpersonal skills, planning, personal coaching and mentoring. He became a motivational speaker, speaking to several hundred large audiences about his POW experiences, relating the same fundamentals of survival and success with their lives.

=== Veterans for Peace ===
Butler served as co-founder and 24-year president of Veterans for Peace chapter 46 (1990–2020). He served as a national board member for 6 years and chair for 4 years. Among many political statements, Butler opposed the candidacy of fellow former POW John McCain in the 2008 US presidential campaign, supporting Barack Obama. He said that "John McCain is not somebody I would like to see with his finger near the red button".

=== Community service ===
- Veterans for Peace chapter 46 of Monterey County
- Coalition of Homeless Services Providers
- Peace Coalition of Monterey County
- Point Lobos State Reserve, docent for 35 years
- Big Sur Land Trust Board member 9 years
- Board member The World Affairs Council of Monterey
- Board member and chair (1997-2000) of National Veterans for Peace
- Community Advisory Committee, California Department of Corrections, Soledad Prison / Correctional Training Facility
- President and Founder of the Management Institute of Monterey
- Board member of Ombudsman for Long Term Care
- Commissioner and Chair of the Community Action Council of Monterey County
- VFP Chapter 46 Co-founder & president 30 years
- The Alliance on Aging
- Big Sur Land Trust BOD 9 years
- Community Advisory Commission for CTF State Prison
- CA State Correctional Training Facility – 11 years - Coaching & mentoring
- Community Action Council of Monterey County
- Monterey County AIDS Project – BOD & Chair 6 years - Companion couple (with wife Barbara) to people with AIDS
- Ombudsman for Long Term Care BOD
- Peace Coalition of Monterey County - 20 years
- Planned Parenthood Mar Monte with Barbara
- Point Lobos State Reserve – Docent 35 years - with Barbara
- SPCA for Monterey County – 10 years with Barbara
- MVAAC Military & Veterans Affairs Advisory Commission for Monterey County – 8 years
- Phil and Barbara actively helped veterans, women, land and environment issues, universities, homeless people, and they gave scholarships to over 35 students at CSUMB (CA State University Monterey Bay) and other universities.

== Writings by Phillip Butler ==
- From Nationalist to Humanist. The Humanist Magazine March/April 1986 Vol 46, pp 23–32
- AIDS awareness; December 13, 1992. The Monterey County Herald guest editorial p 3A
- Why I volunteer June 1, 1996, Monterey Bay community Links
- No Tanks in Monterey 4 July Parade: War machines in city streets sends a wrong message June 27, 1999) Monterey County Herald
- On Torture from someone who knows. American Civil Liberties Union (ACLU) blog June 28, 2009
- Three Lives of a Warrior 2010 Camelot Press ISBN 9781452885032
- Ex-Viet POW Phil Butler on "3 Lives of a Warrior" Peter B Collins show October 19, 2010, PBC broadcast.
- A Vietnam War POW takes America to task over its treatment of a Taliban POW. July 3, 2014. Monterey County Weekly.
- Prisoner Swap re Sgt. Bowe Bergdahl 20 July 2014 Monterey County Weekly
- A Gathering Storm Veterans for Peace newsletter January 5, 2017

== Bibliography ==
- Stockdale, Jim; Stockdale, Sybil (1984). In Love and War: The story of a family's ordeal and sacrifice during the Vietnam years. New York: Harper and Row. ISBN 0-06-015318-0.
- Lockwood, Lee (April 7, 1967). "North Vietnam Under Siege: an exclusive report including 12 pages in color". Look. 62 (14).
- Alvarez, Everett; Schreiner, Samuel (1991). Code of Conduct. Donald I. Fine. ISBN 1556113102.
- Wyatt, Captain Frederick A.; Wyatt, Mrs. Frederick A. (1977). We Came Home. Toluca Lake, CA: POW Publications.
- Alvarez, Everett; Pitch, Anthony S. (1989). Chained Eagle. New York: Donald I. Fine. ISBN 1556111673.
- Hirsch, James S. (2004). Two Souls Indivisible: The Friendship that Saved Two POW's in Vietnam. New York: Houghton Mifflin.
- Blakey, Scott (1978). Prisoner at War: The Survival of Commander Richard A. Stratton. Garden City, New York: Anchor Press/Doubleday. ISBN 038512905X.
- Coffee, Gerald (1990). Beyond Survival: Building on the Hard Times--A POW's Inspiring Story. New York: G. P. Putnam's Sons. ISBN 0399134166.
- Foster, Gary Wayne (2022) The Hanoi March: American POWs in North Vietnam's Crucible ISBN 978-1-954163-35-5, 1954163355.
