= Tap code =

Encoding for text messages

Latin alphabet tap code table
	1	2	3	4	5
1	A	B	C/K	D	E
2	F	G	H	I	J
3	L	M	N	O	P
4	Q	R	S	T	U
5	V	W	X	Y	Z

The tap code, sometimes called the knock code, is a way to encode text messages on a letter-by-letter basis in a very simple way. The message is transmitted using a series of tap sounds, hence its name.

The tap code has been commonly used by prisoners to communicate with each other. The method of communicating is usually by tapping either the metal bars, pipes or the walls inside a cell.

== Design ==
The tap code is based on a Polybius square using a 5×5 grid of letters representing all the letters of the Latin alphabet, except for K, which is represented by C.

Each letter is communicated by tapping two numbers, the first designating the row and the second (after a pause) designating the column. For example, to specify the letter "B", tap once, pause, and then tap twice. The listener only needs to discriminate the timing of the taps to isolate letters.

To communicate the word "hello", the cipher would be the following (with the pause between each number in a pair being shorter than the pause between letters):

H	E	L	L	O
2, 3	1, 5	3, 1	3, 1	3, 4
•• ••• • ••••• ••• • ••• • ••• ••••

The letter "X" is used to break up sentences, and "K" for acknowledgements.

Because of the difficulty and length of time required for specifying a single letter, prisoners often devise abbreviations and acronyms for common items or phrases, such as "GN" for Good night, or "GBU" for God bless you.

By comparison, despite its messages being shorter, Morse code is harder to send by tapping or banging. Its short and long signals can be improvised as taps and thumps, or short and long whistles or scraping sounds, but tap codes are simpler to learn and can be used in a wider variety of situations. The tap system simply requires one to know the alphabet and the short sequence "AFLQV" (the initial letter of each row), without memorising the entire grid. For example, if a person hears four knocks, they can think "A... F... L... Q". If after a pause there are three knocks, they think "Q... R... S" to arrive at the letter S.

== History ==
Russian alphabet tap code
	1	2	3	4	5	6
1	А	Б	В	Г	Д	Е/Ё
2	Ж	З	И/Й	К	Л	М
3	Н	О	П	Р	С	Т
4	У	Ф	Х	Ц	Ч	Ш
5	Щ	Ъ/Ь	Ы	Э	Ю	Я

The origins of this encoding go back to the Polybius square of Ancient Greece. Like the "knock code", a Cyrillic script version is said to have been used by nihilist prisoners of the Russian czars. The knock code is featured in Arthur Koestler's 1941 work Darkness at Noon. Kurt Vonnegut's 1952 novel Player Piano also includes a conversation between prisoners using a form of tap code. The code used in the novel is more primitive and does not make use of the Polybius square (e.g. "P" consists of sixteen taps in a row).

United States prisoners of war during the Vietnam War are most known for having used the tap code. It was introduced in June 1965 by four POWs held in the Hỏa Lò ("Hanoi Hilton") prison: Captain Carlyle "Smitty" Harris, Lieutenant Phillip Butler, Lieutenant Robert Peel, and Lieutenant Commander Robert Shumaker. Harris had heard of the tap code being used by prisoners in World War II and remembered a United States Air Force instructor who had discussed it as well.

In Vietnam, the tap code became more widely used than Morse; despite messages taking longer to send, the system was easier to learn and could be applied in a wider variety of situations. Tap codes proved to be a very successful way for otherwise isolated prisoners to communicate. POWs would use the tap code in order to communicate to each other between cells in a way which the guards would be unable to pick up on. They used it to communicate everything from what questions interrogators were asking (in order for everyone to stay consistent with a deceptive story), to who was hurt and needed others to donate meager food rations. It was easy to teach and newly arrived prisoners became fluent in it within a few days. It was even used when prisoners were sitting next to each other but not allowed to talk, by tapping on another's thigh. U.S. Navy Rear Admiral Jeremiah Denton developed a vocal tap code of coughs, sniffs and sneezes. By overcoming isolation with the tap code, prisoners were said to be able to maintain a chain of command and keep up morale.

In 1980, a doctor sentenced to life in solitary confinement in Somalia used tap code to share the entirety of Tolstoy's Anna Karenina, nearly 2 million letters, via tap code with fellow prisoners.

== In popular culture ==
In the 1990 video game Metal Gear 2: Solid Snake, the tap code is used by Dr. Drago Pettrovich Madnar to communicate to Solid Snake through a cell wall.

In Season 2 Episode 2 of Person of Interest in 2012, the tap code is used by Harold Finch to discreetly leave breadcrumbs of his location to John Reese by encoding his location as tap code on a telephone.

In the 2013 film Escape Plan, Ray Breslin use the tap code to secretly inform prisoners about the planned riot.

In the 2015 video game Her Story, the main characters use the tap code to surreptitiously communicate.

In Season 2 Episode 14 of The Flash in 2016, the masked prisoner in Zoom's lair uses the tap code to try to communicate with the others.

In the 2021 film The Ice Road, the tap code is used on a metal pipe conduit by trapped miners to communicate with executives of the mining company.

== See also ==
- Morse code
- Wabun code
