= Richard P. Keirn =

United States Air Force officer (1924–2000)

- Born: July 29, 1924; Akron, Ohio, U.S.
- Died: May 22, 2000 (aged 75); Melbourne, Florida, U.S.
- Burial place: Florida Memorial Gardens
- Relatives: Steve Keirn (son)
- Military career
- Allegiance: United States
- Branch: United States Army Air Forces; United States Air Force
- Service years: 1942–1976
- Rank: Colonel
- Nickname: Pop
- Conflicts: World War II; Vietnam War
- Awards: Silver Star; Legion of Merit (2); Distinguished Flying Cross (3); Bronze Star Medal (2)

Richard Paul Keirn (29 July 1924 – 22 May 2000) was a colonel and fighter pilot in the United States Air Force. He was one of two United States service members to be a prisoner of war (POW) in both World War II and the Vietnam War and was the first US airman to be shot down by a surface-to-air missile (SAM) during the Vietnam War.

== Early life ==
Keirn was born on 29 July 1924 in Akron, Ohio.

== Air Force career ==
While serving as a United States Army Air Forces flight officer during World War II, Keirn's B-17 was shot down on his first mission and he was held as a prisoner of war in Nazi Germany from 11 September 1944 to 5 May 1945.

Following World War II, Keirn served in the Ohio Air National Guard 164th Fighter Interceptor Squadron before returning to the active Air Force in December 1956.

Captain Keirn volunteered for duty in Vietnam and in July 1965 deployed with the 47th Tactical Fighter Squadron to Ubon Royal Thai Air Force Base, Thailand. On 24 July 1965, his F-4C Phantom #63-7599 was shot down by a North Vietnamese SAM-2 45 miles (72 km) northeast of Hanoi, in the first loss of a US aircraft to a Vietnamese SAM. Keirn ejected successfully from his stricken aircraft and was captured. His bombardier/navigator, Captain Roscoe Henry Fobair, failed to eject and was killed; his remains were recovered in 2001. During his captivity, Keirn was one of 52 Americans forced to participate in the Hanoi March, a propaganda event held in July 1966 in which U.S. POWs were marched through the streets of Hanoi and brutally beaten by North Vietnamese civilians. He was released on 12 February 1973 as a part of Operation Homecoming.

Upon return to the United States, Keirn returned to flying status with the Air Force, flying both the O-2 Skymaster, and RF-4C Phantom II, and served as assistant director and as Director of Operational Services, Deputy Chief of Staff, Operations, Headquarters Ninth Air Force, Shaw Air Force Base, South Carolina, from 23 April 1975 to 30 June 1976.

=== Military awards and decorations ===
Colonel Keirn's major military awards and decorations include:

USAF Command Pilot Badge
Silver Star	Legion of Merit w/ 1 bronze oak leaf cluster	Distinguished Flying Cross w/ 2 bronze oak leaf cluster
Bronze Star w/ Valor device and 3 bronze oak leaf clusters	Purple Heart w/ 4 bronze oak leaf clusters	Air Medal
Joint Service Commendation Medal	Air Force Commendation Medal	Air Force Presidential Unit Citation w/ 2 bronze oak leaf clusters
Air Force Outstanding Unit Award	Prisoner of War Medal w/ 1 bronze service star	Combat Readiness Medal
Army Good Conduct Medal	American Campaign Medal	European–African–Middle Eastern Campaign Medal w/ 1 silver and 2 bronze campaign stars
European–African–Middle Eastern Campaign Medal (second ribbon required for accouterment spacing)	World War II Victory Medal	Medal for Humane Action
National Defense Service Medal w/ 1 service star	Armed Forces Expeditionary Medal	Vietnam Service Medal w/ 4 bronze campaign stars
Air Force Longevity Service Award w/ 4 bronze oak leaf clusters	Armed Forces Reserve Medal w/ silver hourglass device	Small Arms Expert Marksmanship Ribbon
Croix de Guerre with Palm (France)	Republic of Vietnam Gallantry Cross Unit Citation w/ Palm and Frame	Vietnam Campaign Medal

=== Silver Star citation ===
Lieutenant Colonel Richard P. Keirn
U.S. Air Force
Prisoner of War (North Vietnam)
Date of Action: August 15 – November 15, 1967

The President of the United States of America, authorized by Act of Congress, July 8, 1918 (amended by act of July 25, 1963), takes pleasure in presenting the Silver Star to Lieutenant Colonel Richard P. Keirn, United States Air Force, for gallantry and intrepidity in action in connection with military operations against an opposing armed force during August 1967, while a Prisoner of War in North Vietnam. Ignoring international agreements on treatment of prisoners of war, the enemy resorted to mental and physical cruelties to obtain information, confessions, and propaganda materials. Lieutenant Colonel Keirn resisted their demands by calling upon his deepest inner strengths in a manner which reflected his devotion to duty and great credit upon himself and the United States Air Force.

== Family ==
Keirn was married with a son, professional wrestler Steve Keirn and a daughter.
