= Alvin Townley =

American author (born 1975)

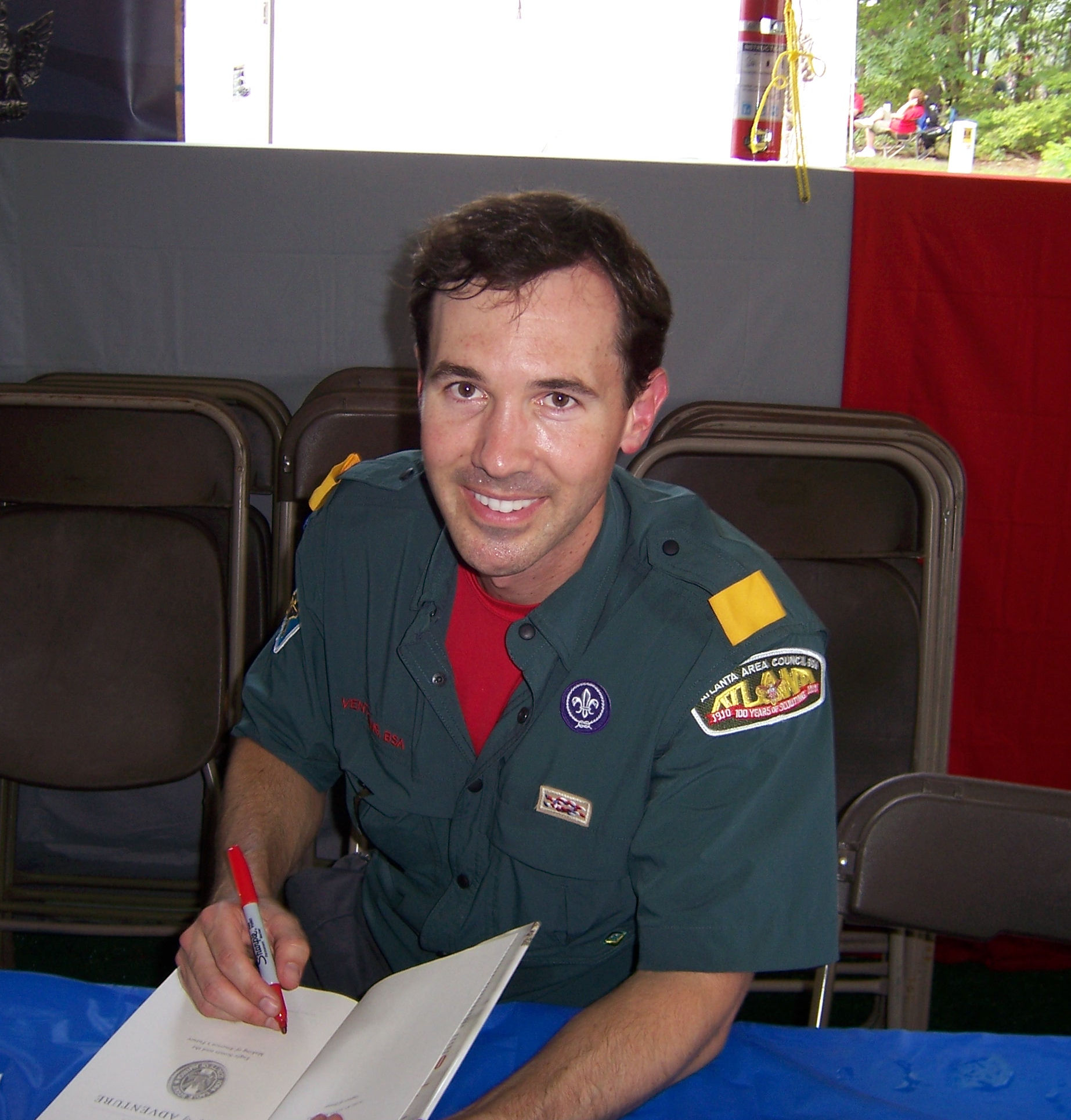
- Alvin Townley at the 2010 National Scout Jamboree

Alvin Townley (born 1975) is an American author who writes about adventure, service, and inspiration. His most recent book, Defiant, about prisoners of war and POW families during the Vietnam era, is his fourth nationally acclaimed work.

He debuted with his best-selling book Legacy of Honor: The Values and Influence of America's Eagle Scouts (St. Martin's Press, New York, 2007), a story of his cross-country journey, during which he met Eagle Scouts from all walks of life.

In 2009 Townley released Spirit of Adventure: Eagle Scouts and the Making of America's Future. It features Ron Young, an Army helicopter pilot and former POW in the 2003 Gulf military action against Iraq who later became a contestant in the reality show The Amazing Race 7. Also featured are twin surgeons Vince and Vance Moss, China Care founder Matt Dalio, Arizona Cardinals lineman Deuce Lutui, Peace Corps volunteers, marine biologists, and naval aviators aboard the aircraft carrier USS Nimitz.

In Summer 2011, St. Martin's Press released Townley's third book, FLY NAVY: Discovering the Enduring Spirit and Extraordinary People of Naval Aviation. To write the book, he traveled to bases across the country and also visited five aircraft carriers in three oceans, meeting the people of naval aviation - past and present, officers and enlisted. The book defines the individuals and values that underlie America's naval air power.

In February 2014, St. Martin's Press released his fourth book, DEFIANT, about eleven extraordinary Vietnam POWs known as the Alcatraz Gang and their wives, who founded the National League of Families. Members of "the eleven" include Medal of Honor recipient James Stockdale, Senator Jeremiah Denton, and Congressman Sam Johnson. The book received praise from The New York Times, John McCain, Jimmy Carter, and many others and earned him Author of the Year honors from the Georgia Writers Association.

Townley is himself an Eagle Scout, having earned his Eagle Scout Award in 1993 with Troop 103 in Atlanta, Georgia. He is a Vigil Member of the Order of the Arrow, and has completed backpacking, canoeing, and sailing adventures at Philmont Scout Ranch, Northern Tier National High Adventure Bases, and the Florida National High Adventure Sea Base.

After graduating from Lakeside High School (DeKalb County, Georgia), the Atlanta native graduated from Washington & Lee University, in Lexington, Virginia in 1997 with a major in politics. There, he was active in student government and the cross-country and track teams. He interned in the U.S. House of Representatives, then went to work for Arthur Andersen LLP, where he managed responsibilities for global strategy and communication in their Worldwide Executive Office. In his twenties, he began a one-year trek across the country to interview Eagle Scouts and discover the legacy of Scouting.

The well-known Eagle Scouts Townley met include Michael Bloomberg, Supreme Court Justice Stephen Breyer, Ross Perot, Defense Secretary Robert Gates and Treasury Secretary Henry Paulson, William H. Gates, Sr., J.W. Marriott, Jr., Bill Bradley, and Jim Lovell of Apollo 13. Others include Tuskegee Airman Percy Sutton, former POW George Thomas Coker, NBA forward Mark Madsen, an NYPD September 11 hero, and a crew of Hurricane Katrina relief workers.

The books received positive reviews from numerous figures, including President Jimmy Carter and novelist Tom Wolfe.

Defense Secretary Robert Gates called his first book “inspirational,” and President Jimmy Carter said, “These Eagle Scouts will inspire readers to become leaders in serving others.” NFL MVP Peyton Manning said, "Spirit of Adventure tells a compelling story about a new generation and America's future." The New York Times called Defiant "gripping."

Alvin resides in Atlanta, Georgia.
