= Alcatraz Gang =

Group of US prisoners of war in Vietnam

Coordinates: 21°1′31″N 105°50′47″E

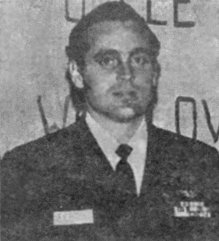
LT George T. Coker, USN, shortly after his release from the POW camps in North Vietnam; March 1973.

The Alcatraz Gang was a group of eleven American prisoners of war (POW) held separately in Hanoi, North Vietnam during the Vietnam War because of their particular resistance to their North-Vietnamese military captors. These eleven POWs were: George Thomas Coker, USN; Jeremiah Denton, USN; Harry Jenkins, USN; Sam Johnson, USAF; George McKnight, USAF; James Mulligan, USN; Howard Rutledge, USN; Robert Shumaker, USN; James Stockdale, USN; Ron Storz, USAF; and Nels Tanner, USN.

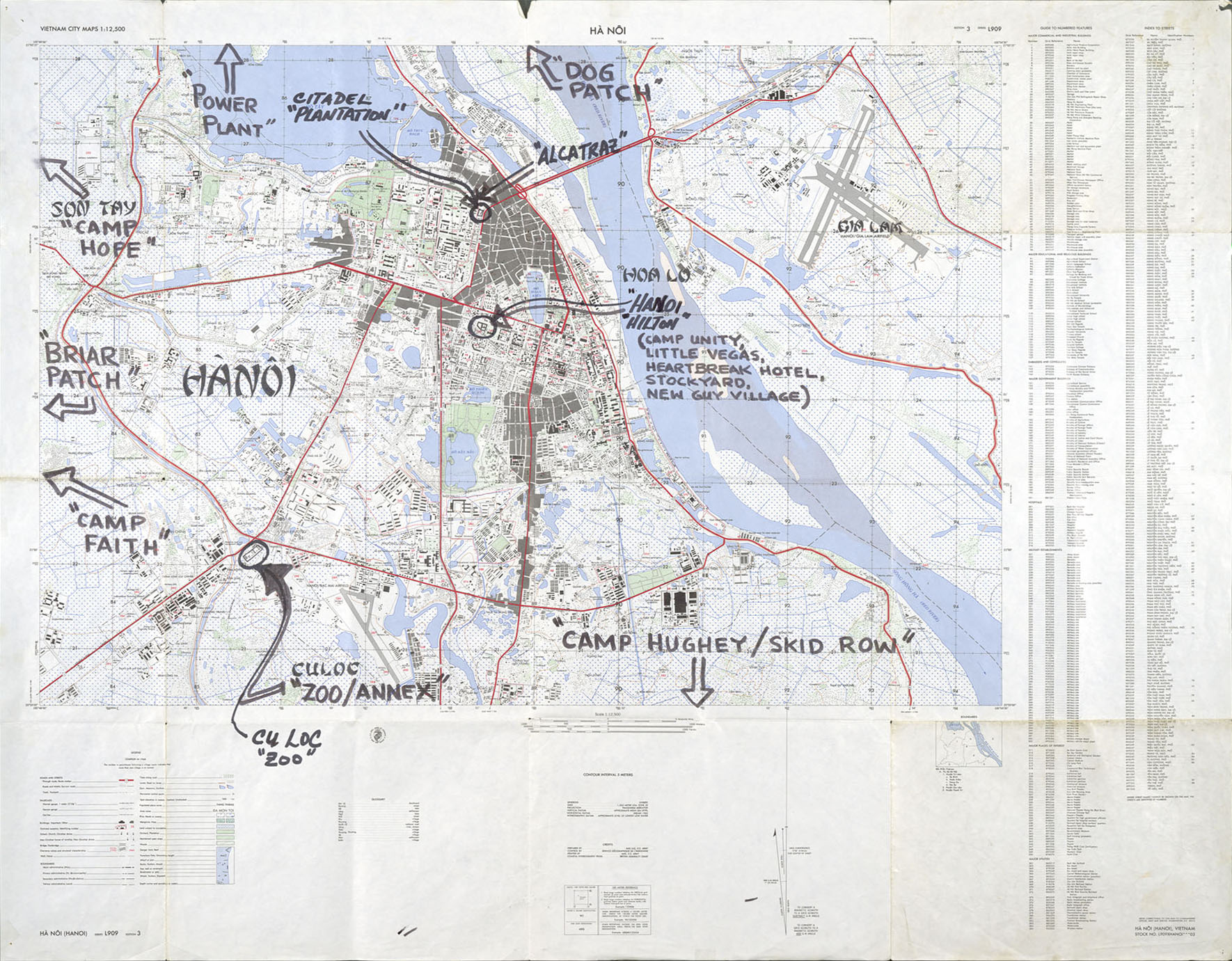
Map annotated by former POW Mike McGrath (Navy pilot), indicating the location of Alcatraz and the Hanoi Hilton

These prisoners were held in solitary confinement from 25 October 1967 to 9 December 1969 at a special facility (dubbed "Alcatraz" by Stockdale) in a courtyard behind the North Vietnamese Ministry of National Defense, about a mile away from Hỏa Lò Prison ("Hanoi Hilton"-named by Schumaker, the earliest captured prisoner among the eleven). The prisoners were shackled with legcuffs every night in 3-by-9-foot windowless concrete cells with the light on around the clock. (Note: Rochester & Kiley 2007, p. 326) The 11 Americans were separated because they were leaders of the prisoners' resistance. Stockdale once tried to kill himself so that the North Vietnamese could not force him to make a propaganda film, though he survived the suicide attempt. The film was never made. Of Stockdale, Coker said "He was probably the strongest, most exemplary leader of the whole North Vietnamese POW environment". Coker and McKnight were the last POWs assigned to the Alcatraz Gang, being so assigned for previous fierce resistance to their treatment and an unsuccessful escape from the Power Plant or "Dirty Bird" prison camp.

The group received special torture and were taken into torture sessions in order of rank, highest to lowest. Coker was the youngest and lowest ranking of the eleven POWs and was taken in last. He said he is still grateful for every minute the others held out. During the end of his session, something changed and the session stopped, which the POWs thought was because of a political decision from higher authorities to stop the sessions. All of the prisoners except Storz were moved to other prisons in December 1969. Storz, debilitated from sickness and untreated injuries, was left behind and died in captivity on 23 April 1970.

When all the POWs were released from North Vietnam in February and March 1973 (Operation Homecoming), so much had changed back in the United States that Coker (and Denton) said it was as if "... we weren't here (in America) at all. We were strangers in our own country, and we didn't like a lot of what we saw". Many still have throbbing in joints from the rope torture and Coker's wife says, "In his sleep, he holds up 'the wall'". Coker also said, "If you're never tested, you don't know (what you can do)".

Rutledge died at 55 on 11 June 1984, after an 18 month battle with cancer. Jenkins was killed in an aircraft accident on 2 August 1995. Stockdale, who was awarded the Medal of Honor, died on 5 July 2005 after a battle with Alzheimer's disease. Denton, who went on to become a Senator, died in 2014. Tanner died on 12 June 2015 at 82. Johnson, who served in the House of Representatives, died in 2020. Mulligan died on 18 January 2023 at 96. This leaves two survivors - Coker, and Shumaker.

== See also ==
- United States prisoners of war during the Vietnam War
