= Ronald E. Storz =

U.S. Airforce Pilot

- Born: October 21, 1933; New York City, New York, U.S.
- Died: April 23, 1970 (aged 36); Hanoi, North Vietnam
- Military career
- Allegiance: United States
- Branch: United States Air Force
- Service years: 1952–1970
- Rank: Lieutenant Colonel
- Conflicts: Vietnam War
- Awards: Air Force Cross; Legion of Merit; Prisoner of War Medal

Ronald E. Storz (October 21, 1933 – April 23, 1970) was a United States Air Force pilot and recipient of the Air Force Cross who died in captivity as a prisoner of war during the Vietnam War.

== Biography ==
Ron Storz was born on October 21, 1933, in New York City, New York. He enlisted in the U.S. Air Force on June 12, 1952, entering the Aviation Cadet Program for Navigator/Aviation Observer training on March 27, 1954. He was commissioned a Second Lieutenant in the Air Force on August 9, 1955.

=== Vietnam War ===
In 1965, then-Captain Storz was serving as a Forward Air Controller flying a O-1 Bird Dog aircraft with the 33rd Air Base Squadron at Tan Son Nhut Air Base in South Vietnam. On April 28, 1965, he was shot down near the Vietnamese Demilitarized Zone separating North Vietnam and South Vietnam and captured. During his captivity, Storz was one of 52 Americans forced to participate in the Hanoi March, a propaganda event held in July 1966 in which U.S. prisoners of war were marched through the streets of Hanoi and brutally beaten by North Vietnamese civilians.

Storz was a member of the Alcatraz Gang, a group of eleven American prisoners held separately from other POWs because of their particular resistance to their captors. These prisoners were held in solitary confinement from October 1967 to December 1969 at a special facility (dubbed “Alcatraz” by ranking POW James Stockdale) in a courtyard behind the North Vietnamese Ministry of National Defense, about a mile away from Hỏa Lò Prison (nicknamed the “Hanoi Hilton” by U.S. POWs).

Debilitated from sickness and untreated injuries, Storz lapsed into a coma and died In April 1970. His remains were repatriated to the United States on March 6, 1974. For his conduct as a prisoner of war, Storz received the Air Force Cross, the United States Air Force's highest decoration for extraordinary heroism. Additional awards included the Legion of Merit and the Prisoner of War Medal.

== Air Force Cross citation ==
Ronald Edward Storz
Lieutenant Colonel, U.S. Air Force
Date of Action: August 1967 to April 1970

The President of the United States of America, authorized by Title 10, Section 8742, United States Code, takes pride in presenting the Air Force Cross (Posthumously) to Lieutenant Colonel Ronald Edward Storz (AFSN: 0-3057474/12404348), United States Air Force (Reserve), for extraordinary heroism in military operations against an opposing armed force while a Prisoner of War in North Vietnam from August 1967 to April 1970. Through his extraordinary heroism and willpower, in the face of the enemy, Lieutenant Colonel Storz reflected the highest credit upon himself and the United States Air Force.
