= Hanoi Towers =

Coordinates: 21.025660°N 105.845724°E

- Tháp Hà Nội, Tháp Trung tâm Hà Nội
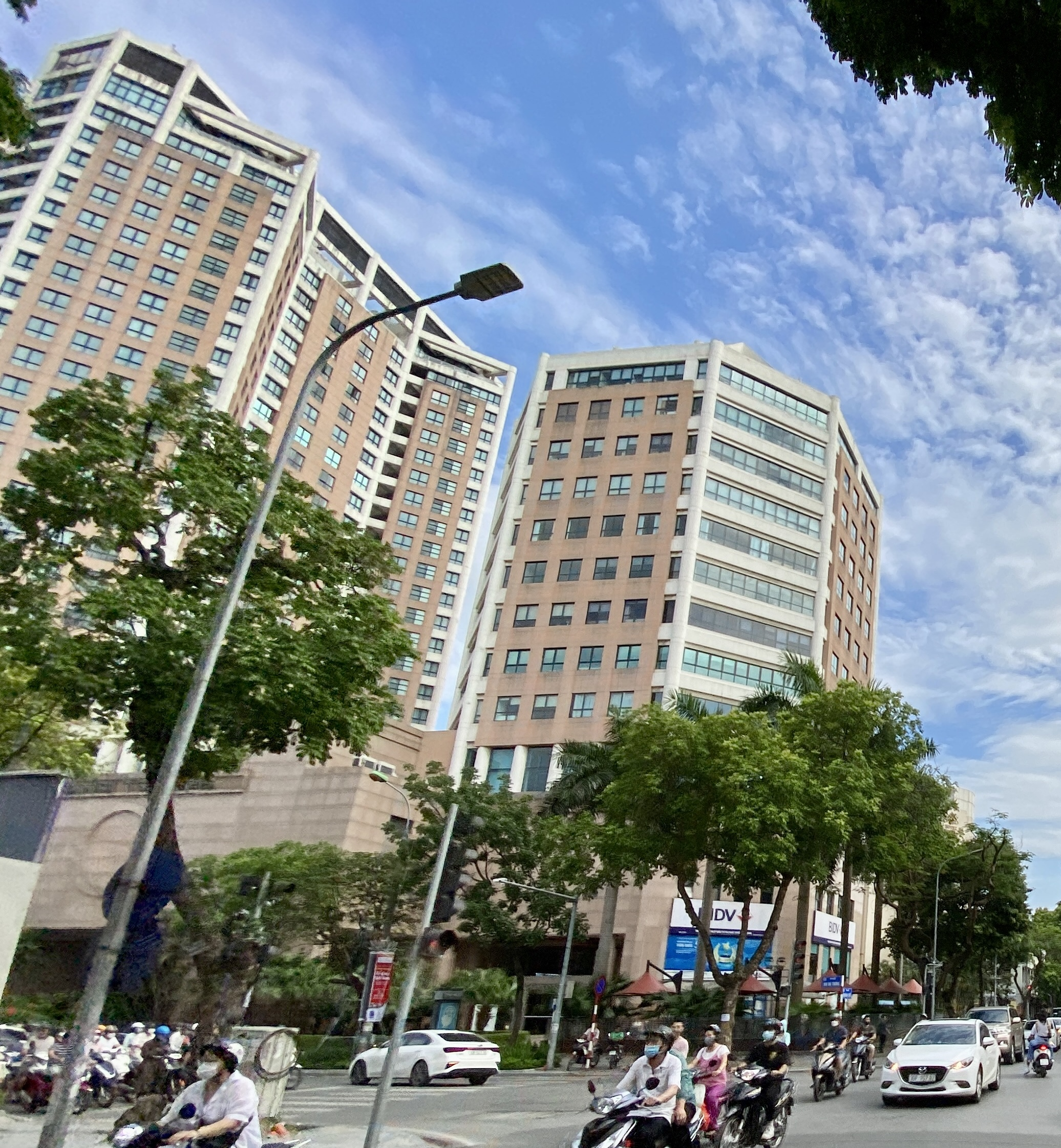
- Hanoi Towers looked from Quán Sứ street
- Alternative names: Hanoi Tower Center; Somerset Grand Hanoi
- Hotel chain: Somerset by The Ascott Limited

Record height
- Tallest in Hanoi from 1997 to 2007^{[I]}
- Preceded by: Hanoi Daewoo Hotel
- Surpassed by: 34T Trung Hoà–Nhân Chính

General information
- Status: Completed
- Type: Office, hotels, serviced apartments
- Architectural style: Modernist
- Location: 49 Hai Bà Trưng Street, Cửa Nam (French Quarter, Hoàn Kiếm district), Hanoi, Vietnam
- Year built: 2
- Construction started: June 1995
- Completed: November 1995
- Inaugurated: December 1997; 28 years ago
- Owner: CapitaLand
- Landlord: Hanoi Tower Center Co., Ltd

Technical details
- Floor count: Hanoi Tower: 14; Somerset Grand Hanoi: 27
- Floor area: 45,000 m^{2} (484,376 sq ft)

Design and construction
- Architecture firm: RDC Architects
- Services engineer: Electrical Works Plumbing & Sanitary Works
- Main contractor: Ssangyong E&C

Other information
- Number of rooms: 185
- Parking: 2 underground floors

The Hanoi Towers or Hanoi Tower Center (Vietnamese: Tháp Hà Nội, Tháp Trung tâm Hà Nội) is a complex building in Hanoi, the capital city of Vietnam. The building is located on the land which was mostly part of Hỏa Lò Prison and surrounded by three streets: Hai Bà Trưng, Quán Sứ, and Thợ Nhuộm. It consists of a 14-story office building called the Hanoi Tower or The Office [of Hanoi Towers], with a dual-block 27-story apartment hotel building, Somerset Grand Hanoi. The investor and operator of the complex is the Singapore-based The Ascott Limited, a subsidiary of CapitaLand.

Since the building was completed, the Somerset Grand Hanoi Tower was the highest building in Hanoi until 2007, when the apartment building 34T Trung Hòa — Nhân Chính in Cầu Giấy District completed. However, the building is still the highest one in Hoàn Kiếm District, as the city's government has ordered a height limit on new buildings in the historic downtown area since 2021.

== History ==
Before the mid-1990s, the area of the building now was mostly part of Hỏa Lò Prison. After breaking part of the prison, the complex was started to build in mid of 1995 and inaugurated in late 1997.

== Towers use ==
=== Offices ===
The office tower of the complex, Hanoi Tower with the podium frontier on Hai Bà Trưng Street, is currently the location for some of major company offices are AIG, BIDV, Cathay Pacific, Cathay United Bank, IWG plc (formerly Regus), KfW, Malaysia Airlines, NH Investment & Securities, Ocean Bank

=== Embassies ===
The office tower also home of some embassies, including:

- Embassy of Norway, 8th Floor
- Embassy of Belgium, 9th Floor
- Embassy of Israel, 10th Floor

=== Retail and services ===
The podium is the common space for offices and retail. The Hanoi Towers Shopping Center is located on the Thợ Nhuộm street side and Hanoi Tower Wedding & Convention Center are on Hai Bà Trưng Street, including Wayne's Coffee and Unik Mart.

A swimming pool and tennis court are on the roof of the podium.

== Gallery ==
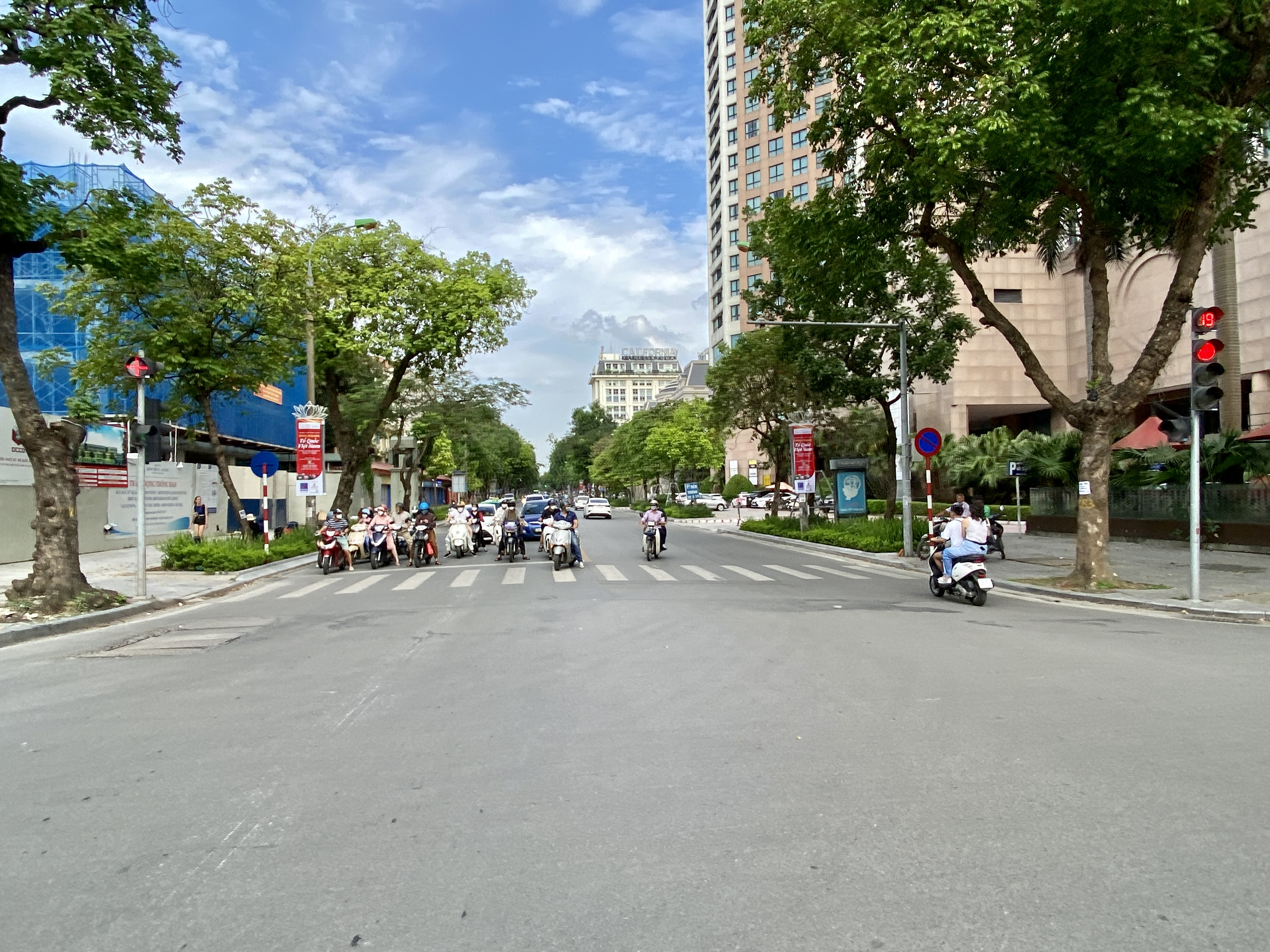
The building main entrance seen from Quán Sứ Street

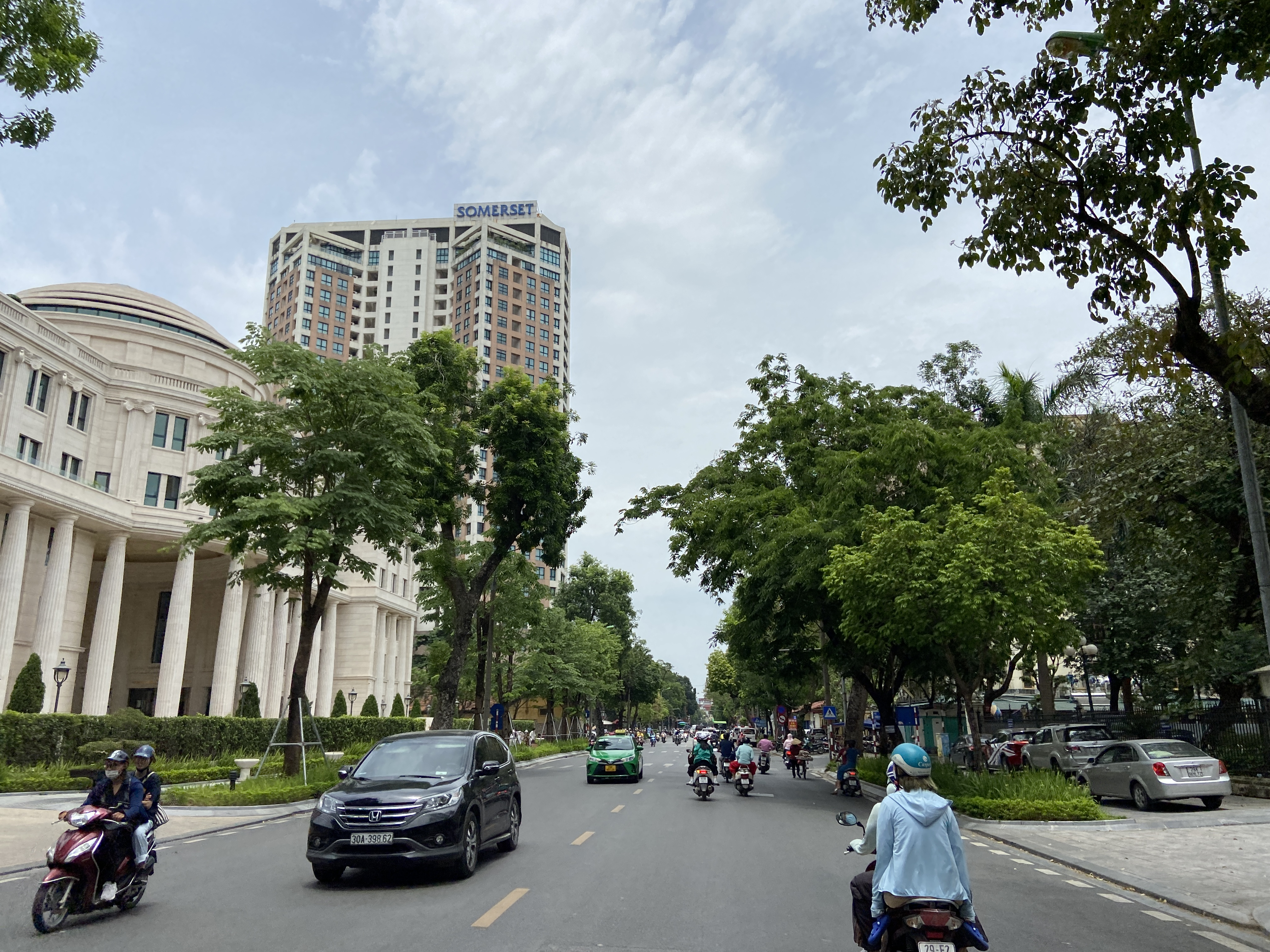
Somerset Grand Hanoi with Supreme People's Court of Vietnam on Hai Bà Trưng Street

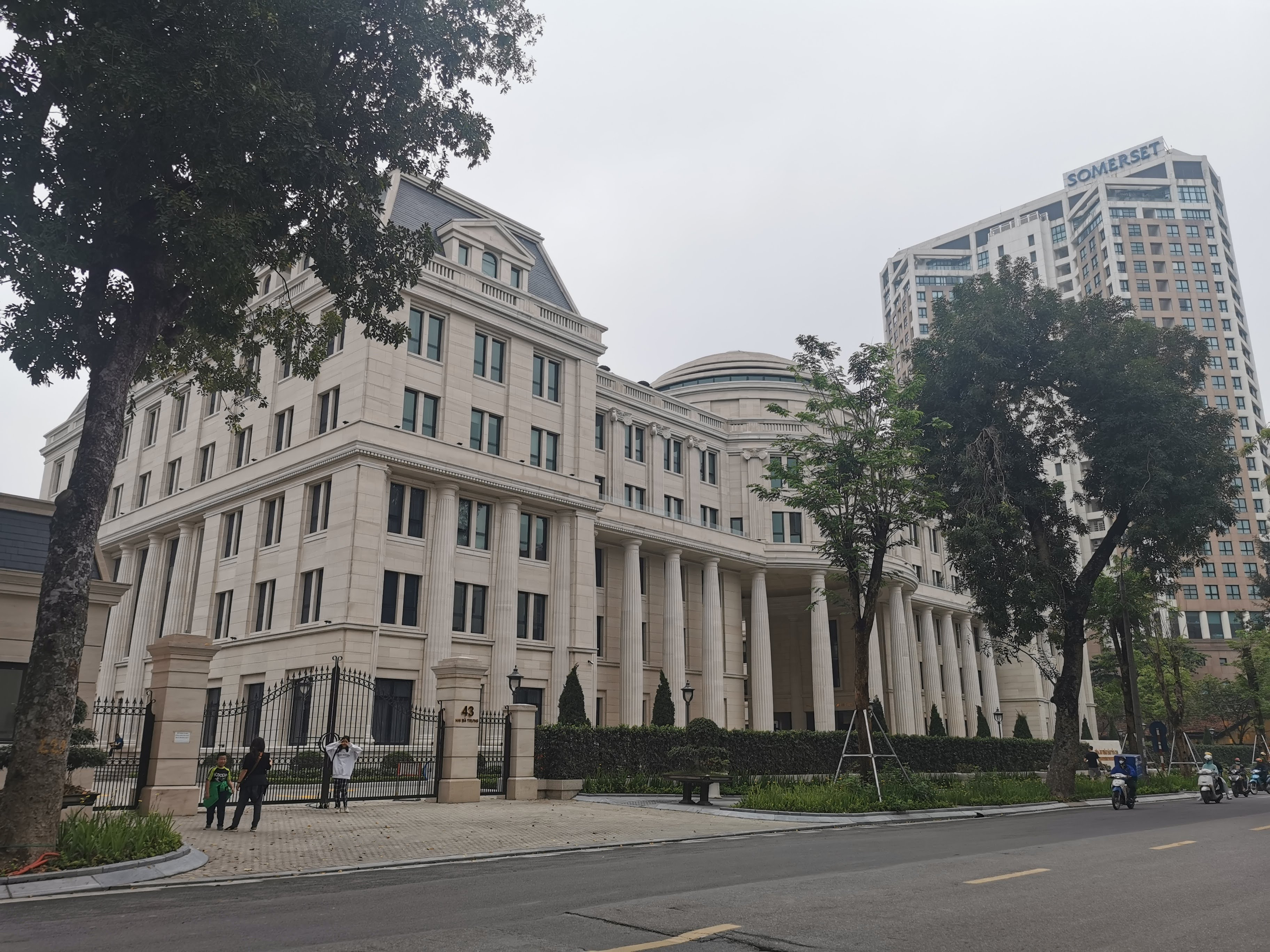
Another view of the Supreme People's Court of Vietnam next to Hanoi Towers
