= Webster High School (Tulsa, Oklahoma) =

Coordinates: 36.105524°N 96.014238°W

Daniel Webster High School
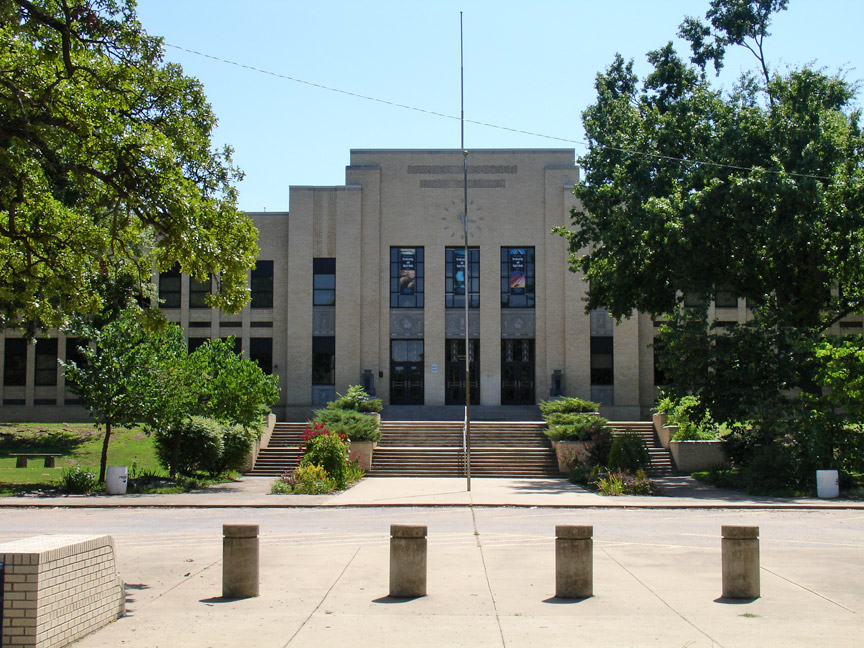
- 1919 West 40th Street, Tulsa, Oklahoma

Information
- Type: Public broadcasting and digital media magnet school
- Established: 1938
- Principal: Jennifer Baugess
- Staff: 19.83 (FTE)
- Grades: 9-12
- Enrollment: 380 (2023–2024)
- Student to teacher ratio: 19.16
- Colors: Blue and white
- Mascot: Warrior
- Website: Daniel Webster High School

Daniel Webster High School is a high school in Tulsa, Oklahoma, United States. (Note: Often referred to as Daniel Webster Middle and High School, because it serves 9th grade students, who would otherwise attend a middle school (grades 6-9) in the Tulsa Public School System.) It is part of the Tulsa Public Schools, and is a public school for students from grades 9 through 12. The school opened in 1938 in the West Tulsa section of the city, and is housed in a PWA-style Art Deco building designed by architects Arthur M. Atkinson, John Duncan Forsyth, Raymond Kerr, and William H. Wolaver.

In 2021, Daniel Webster High School was placed on the National Historic Registry.

In 2009, the school established a broadcasting and digital media magnet school program.

== Facility description ==
The main building is two stories high plus a full basement. It contains 15 classrooms, a library, two cafeterias, a lecture room, a corrective gymnasium, a girls' gymnasium, a 400-seat auditorium, a domestic-science department, two manual training rooms, three laboratories, offices, and dressing rooms. An adjacent building contains shops, a boys' gymnasium, and lockers. Both buildings are made of fireproof construction with exterior walls of brick and trimmed with stone.

== Notable alumni ==
- Bob Ballinger - member of the Arkansas House of Representatives from Berryville, Arkansas
- Chris Benge - speaker of the Oklahoma House of Representatives
- Bill Borders - former Olympian wrestler and attorney from Tulsa, Oklahoma
- Dick Calmus - former major league baseball pitcher
- Carl Morton - former major league baseball pitcher
- Patti Page - singer, 2013 recipient of Grammy Lifetime Achievement Award
- Howard Rutledge (Class of 1946) - Vietnam POW for 7 1/2 yrs; wrote book In the Presence of Mine Enemies
- Mitch Schauer - television producer and animator, The Angry Beavers
