= John Heaphy Fellowes =

Vietnam-era POW hero (1932–2010)

John H. "Jack" Fellowes
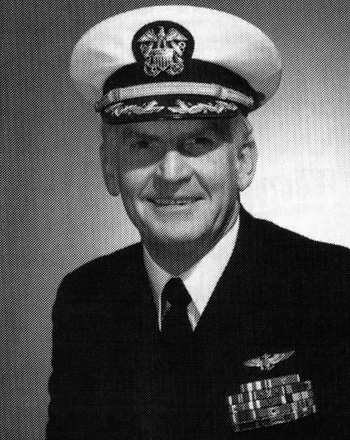
- Fellowes' USN photo (c. 1985)
- Born: November 22, 1932; Buffalo, New York
- Died: May 3, 2010 (aged 77); Annapolis, Maryland
- Burial place: Annapolis, Maryland
- Military career
- Allegiance: United States
- Branch: United States Navy
- Service years: 1951–1986
- Rank: Captain
- Commands: Attack Squadron 65, USS Constellation
- Conflicts: Vietnam War
- Awards: Silver Star; Legion of Merit (2); Distinguished Flying Cross; Bronze Star (3); Purple Heart (2); POW Medal

John Heaphy "Jack" Fellowes (November 22, 1932 – May 3, 2010) was a U.S. Navy captain, pilot who became a prisoner of war (POW) during the Vietnam War. He was known as "Happy Jack" because of his infectious sense of humor, which he maintained even while a POW. He was awarded the Silver Star for his "conspicuous gallantry and intrepidity" while a POW, credited with "contributed significantly toward the eventual abandonment of harsh treatment by the North Vietnamese".

== Early life ==
Fellowes was born in Buffalo, New York, and raised in Tucson, Arizona. He graduated from Tucson High School in 1950 and The Hill School in 1951. He enlisted in the Navy on August 27, 1951, and obtained an appointment to the United States Naval Academy, from which he graduated in 1956.

== Vietnam tour of duty ==
In 1966, the A-6 Intruder aircraft which Fellows was piloting was shot down over North Vietnam. He was held as a prisoner of war in POW camps for six and a half years (1966–1973). After his release, he continued to serve in the Navy until his retirement in July 1986.

On Fellowes' 55th bombing mission, he was a Lieutenant Commander serving as the pilot of an A-6 Intruder from squadron VA-65 operating from the USS Constellation (CV-64), when he and his Bombardier–Navigator, Lieutenant, junior grade George Thomas Coker, were shot down over North Vietnam on August 27, 1966, while flying near Vinh in Nghệ An Province. The aircraft was hit by a surface-to-air missile which blew off the right wing, and the two crewmembers ejected from the aircraft after it went into a flat spin. Their wingman tracked the parachutes as the crew descended, but lost sight of them because of poor visibility and flak after the crew were within 50 feet of the ground. Ejection was at about 2,000 feet altitude and 18 miles inland in flat terrain. Coker and Fellowes landed about one mile apart. Fellowes landed on a hillside and Coker in a large rice paddy in a well-populated area. Both were captured by armed villagers soon after landing. At the time of his capture, Fellowes had a broken back. For three hours after they ejected, American aircraft made a thorough search, despite moderate to heavy flak, but were unable to spot the parachutes or get a signal from their emergency beepers. When he realized he was going to be captured, Fellowes sat down to light a cigar but his captor grabbed it out of his hand as he was about to light it. This convinced him the enemy was not amicable.

Fellowes verbally gave credit to fellow POWs for their "leadership qualities" and their devotion to survival; as well as the moral integrity his comrades displayed. Some of those which Fellowes spoke of were James Stockdale, Jeremiah Denton, and Robinson Risner. In later years Fellowes not only spoke of the abysmal treatment of the POWs in regards to the lack of medical treatment and poor food supplies, but also extolled the virtues of survival training and moral virtues that the military training had provided.

Fellowes was held in five different camps while a POW including Cu Loc, Hỏa Lò ("Hanoi Hilton"), and Alcatraz Grove, during which he was beaten, tortured, and starved. At one point he was tortured for 12 continuous hours, which resulted in permanent damage to both of his arms. On March 4, 1973, both Coker and Fellowes were released as part of Operation Homecoming. Vietnam-era POWs were released in order of capture, and Fellowes and Coker were in the second large release group, about #123 and #124. Of their 2,382 days in captivity (6.5 years), 2.5 years were in solitary confinement and 2.5 years in the "Hanoi Hilton". They also spent time in several other POW camps around Hanoi. Fellowes was promoted to Commander while a POW.

Fellowes was awarded the Silver Star for his leadership and resistance while a POW. The citation reads in part:

...For conspicuous gallantry and intrepidity while interned as a Prisoner of War in North Vietnam on August 27, 1966. Commander Fellowes' captors, completely ignoring international agreements, subjected him to extreme mental and physical cruelties in an attempt to obtain military information and false confessions for propaganda purposes. Through his resistance to those brutalities, he contributed significantly toward the eventual abandonment of harsh treatment by the North Vietnamese, which was attracting international attention. By his determination, courage, resourcefulness, and devotion, Commander Fellowes reflected great credit upon himself and upheld the highest traditions of the Naval Service and the United States Armed Forces.

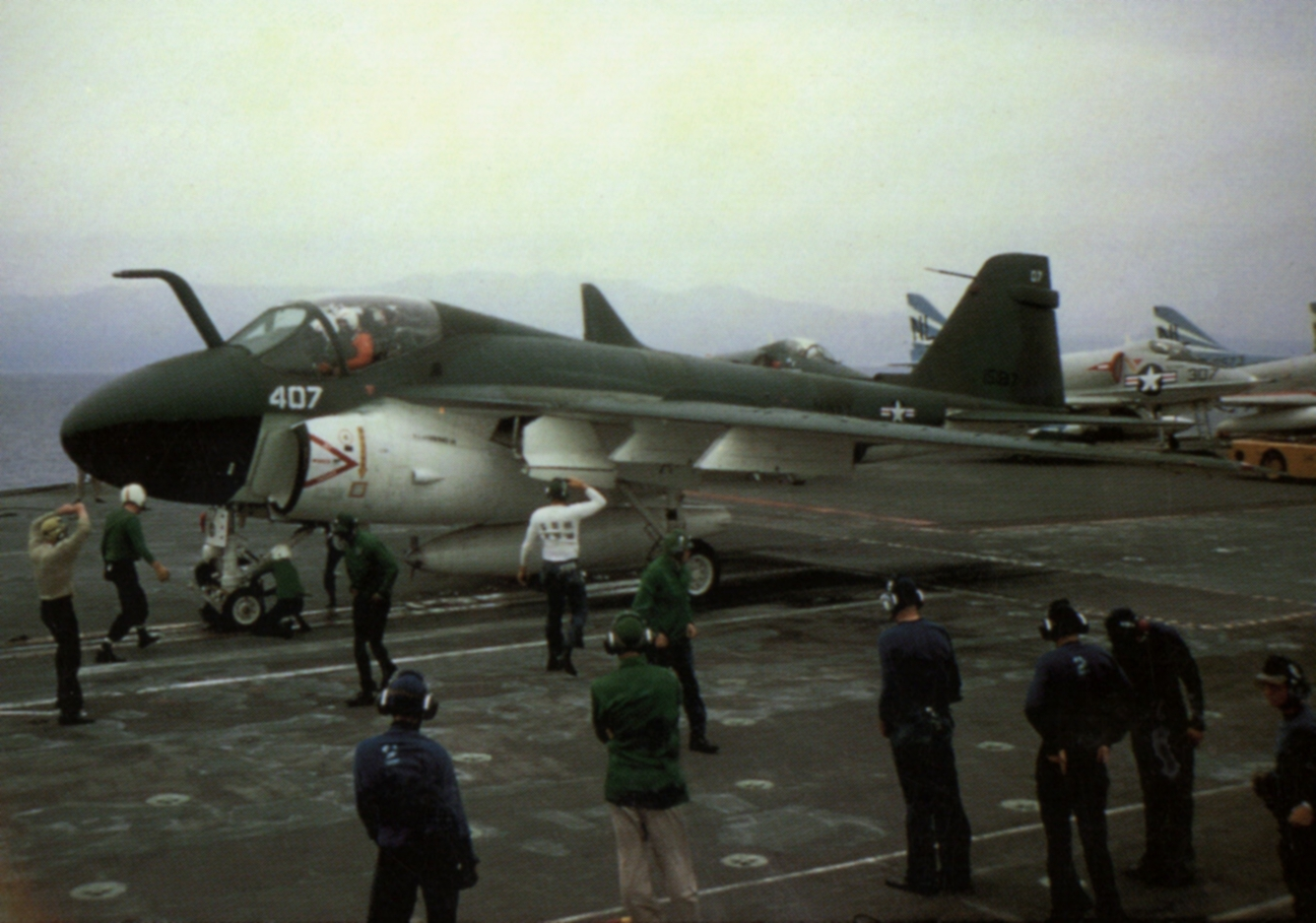
A-6 Intruders flown by VA-65 in 1966

== After Vietnam ==
Fellowes remained in the Navy until July 1986; George Coker until September 1986. Fellowes served as an instructor at the Naval Academy from 1973 to 1977 and then attended the Naval War College from 1977 to 1978. The last six years of his career he served with the Navy Regional Physical Evaluation Board. In retirement he mentored midshipmen at the United States Naval Academy, teaching them about leadership and integrity. Fellowes died of congestive heart failure at his home in Annapolis, Maryland on May 3, 2010, and is buried at the United States Naval Academy Cemetery. Funeral services were held on May 14, 2010, at the Naval Academy Chapel. He and his wife Pat had four children: Cathy, Sharon, John (who also served as a Navy Navigator) and Tom.

Fellowes is one of the three credited by Lanny Bassham, in his book 'Freedom Flight', for the development of his mental management system.

== Military decorations ==
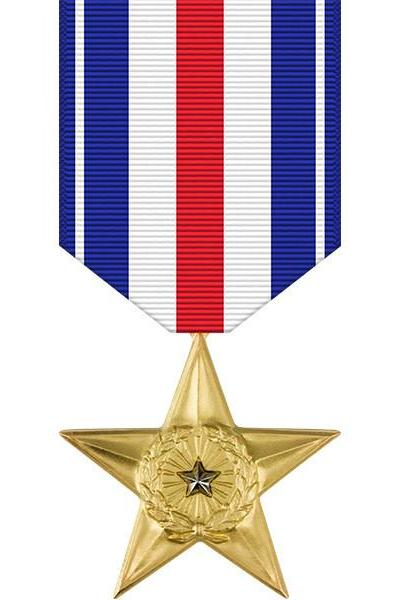
Silver Star

Among Fellowes' military decorations are the following:

- Silver Star
- Legion of Merit, two, + Combat V
- Distinguished Flying Cross
- Bronze Star, three, + Combat V
- Purple Heart, two
- Air Medal, five
- Navy Commendation, two, + Combat V
- Combat Action Ribbon
- Navy Unit Commendation
- POW Medal
- National Defense Service Medal, two
- Vietnam Service Medal
- Vietnam Gallantry Cross Unit Citation
- Vietnam Civil Actions Medal
- Vietnam Campaign Medal

== Bibliography ==
- Olson, James Stuart (1988). Dictionary of the Vietnam War. Westport, Connecticut: Greenwood Press. ISBN 978-0-313-24943-3.
