= Leon Ellis =

Leon Ellis may refer to:

- Leon F. "Lee" Ellis, United States Air Force colonel, author, speaker, and consultant
- Leon MacIntosh Ellis, New Zealand forestry administrator and consultant
