= Trần Duyệt =

Vietnamese prison warden and colonel (1933–2025)

Trần Trọng Duyệt (Chinese: 陈钟阅; 1933 – 27 August 2025) was a Vietnamese prison warden and colonel. He was a jailer and chief warden of Hỏa Lò Prison from 1967 to 1973. In 2008, he endorsed John McCain's bid in the presidential election.

== Biography ==
Trọng Duyệt was born in 1933 in Thái Bình, into a family with a revolutionary background. His father was a Confucian scholar and teacher. The family had eight children, and all five sons participated in the revolution. Two of his elder brothers were killed during the resistance war against the French.

In 1949, Trọng Duyệt joined the Youth for National Salvation unit in Hữu Nam commune. A year after, he became a soldier and took part in combat operations against French colonial forces during the liberation of Thái Bình. Following the restoration of peace in North Vietnam in 1954, he attended the Military Command School of the Tả Ngân Military Region and was subsequently assigned to Regiment 50 of that region.

Between 1963 and 1965, he served as a political instructor at the Anti-Aircraft Artillery Officer School, while also taking part in operations in Quảng Bình and Vĩnh Linh. From June 1966 to October 1967, he worked as an editor for psychological operations broadcasts transmitted by Voice of Vietnam. From November 1967 to March 1973, he was responsible for managing prisoner-of-war pilots held at Hỏa Lò Prison in Hanoi. His notable prisoners were John McCain and West German nurse Monika Schwinn.

After the handover of American prisoners under the Paris Peace Accords, he participated in the Bình Trị Thiên campaign, the Battle of Buôn Ma Thuột, and the campaign for the capture of Saigon. Following Vietnam's reunification, he served in the General Political Department and later undertook international assignments in Cambodia. After returning to Vietnam, he became Chief of Political Affairs of the Navy General Staff, a position he held until his retirement in 1994.

Trọng Duyệt died in Haiphong on 27 August 2025, at the age of 92.
