= Ocean Bank =

U.S. commercial bank

- Type: Privately owned
- Industry: Finance
- Founded: December 8, 1982; 43 years ago
- Headquarters: 780 NW 42nd Avenue; Miami, Florida, U.S.
- Key people: A. Alfonso Macedo (President and CEO)
- Products: Loans, deposit products, investments, merchant card services, and cash management services
- Total assets: USD 6.4 billion
- Website: oceanbank.com

Ocean Bank is the largest independent state-chartered commercial bank headquartered in Florida. Ocean Bank was founded in 1982 and is headquartered in Miami, Florida.

Ocean Bank serves the Florida market with 23 branches in Miami-Dade and Broward counties and Orlando, and is expanding into Palm Beach County during 2024. Ocean Bank serves the banking needs of Florida’s privately owned businesses, real estate developers, construction companies, professionals, consumers and high-net-worth individuals.

- Commercial, Business & Personal Banking
- Corporate Cash Management
- Real Estate & Construction Financing
- Global Financing
- Commercial Mortgage Financing
- Factoring
- Personal Loans & Home Mortgages
- Credit Cards
- Digital Banking

Banking is complemented by investment products and advisory services. High-net-worth individuals and their families are provided investment financial services through Ocean Financial Advisors, a registered investment advisor with the State of Florida and Ocean Financial Services, a FINRA-registered broker-dealer. Investment products offered exclusively by Ocean Financial Services, LLC are not bank deposits, are not insured by the FDIC, are not guaranteed by the bank and are subject to investment risk, including the possible loss of the principal invested. Investment advisory services are offered through Ocean Financial Advisors, LLC an investment advisor registered with the State of Florida. Ocean Financial Services, LLC and Ocean Financial Advisors, LLC are wholly owned subsidiaries of Ocean Bank.

- Investment Management
- Financial Advisory
- Wealth Management
- Global Banking

No loan provision was required for the fourth quarter of 2023 which reinforces the financial health of the Bank's loan portfolio. Capitalized at more than twice the amount to achieve “well-capitalized” status (highest level) as rated by U.S. banking regulators. BauerFinancial, an independent company that rates bank performance, has awarded Ocean Bank its highest rating of 5 Stars every quarter for seven years.

== Executive officers ==
- A. Alfonso Macedo, president, chief executive officer and chairman of the board
- Barbara Brick, executive vice president and director of BSA and compliance
- Rodolfo Bucaro, executive vice president and chief information officer
- Eddie Diaz, executive vice president and head of corporate lending
- Manuel M. Del Cañal, executive vice president and head of wealth management
- Vanessa Lugo, executive vice president and chief financial officer
- Pedro Max, executive vice president and head of business banking and branches
- Sam Monti, executive vice president and chief credit officer
- Yuni Navarro, executive vice president and chief administrative officer
- Stan Rubin, executive vice president and chief risk officer
- Rogelio Villarreal, executive vice president and head of commercial lending

== Branches ==
Miami-Dade County

Main Office, Airport West, Aventura, Bird Road, Brickell, Coral Gables, Coral Way, Doral, Downtown Miami, Kendall, Miami Beach, Miami Lakes, Miller Drive, Palm Springs, Pinecrest, South Miami, West Flagler, West Hialeah, West Kendall, West Miami

Broward County

Downtown Fort Lauderdale and Weston

Orange County

Downtown Orlando

Palm Beach County

Boca Raton (coming in 2024)

Wealth Management

Main Office, Brickell
