= George Thomas Coker =

United States Navy commander (born 1943)

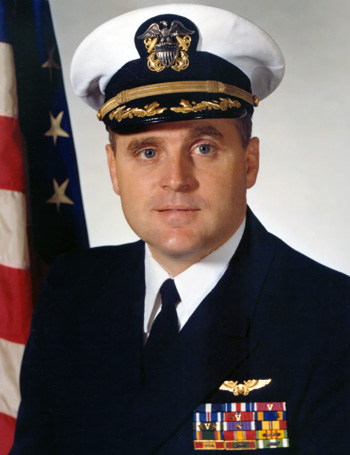
- Coker's USN photo (c. 1980)
- Born: July 14, 1943 (age 83); Amarillo, Texas
- Education: Rutgers University; University of San Diego; Old Dominion University
- Children: 3
- Military career
- Allegiance: United States
- Branch: United States Navy
- Service years: 1963–1986
- Rank: Commander
- Units: Attack Squadron 65, USS Constellation
- Conflicts: Vietnam War
- Awards: Navy Cross; Silver Star; Legion of Merit; Distinguished Flying Cross; Bronze Star Medal (2); Purple Heart (2); Meritorious Service Medal; Air Medal (5)
- Other work: Distinguished Eagle Scout

George Thomas Coker (born July 14, 1943) is a retired United States Navy commander who was awarded the Navy Cross for extraordinary heroism as a prisoner of war (POW) during the Vietnam War. An Eagle Scout, he is noted for his devotion to Scouting.

In 1966, the A-6 Intruder jet on which Coker was serving as co-pilot, bombardier, and navigator was shot down over North Vietnam. He was held as a prisoner of war in the "Hanoi Hilton" and other camps for six and a half years. After his release, he continued to serve in the Navy until his retirement in 1986.

== Personal information ==
George Coker was born in Amarillo, Texas, on July 14, 1943. In 1951, his family moved to Linden, New Jersey, where he became a New Jersey high school state wrestling champion in the 142 lb weight class and played high school varsity football at Saint Benedict's Preparatory School in Newark, New Jersey. Coker attended Rutgers University from 1961 to 1963, where he also wrestled. While at Rutgers, he participated in an aviation officer cadet program and was commissioned an ensign in the United States Navy. After his release from Vietnam, he returned to college and graduated from the University of San Diego in 1976 with a BS in political science. He studied education and mathematics at Old Dominion University from 1982 to 1986. Coker is married and has three children, two daughters and a son, Theresa, Elizabeth, and Thomas Jr.

== Scouting life ==
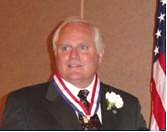
George Thomas Coker after receiving his Distinguished Eagle Scout Award; August 9, 2005.

Coker grew up in Linden, New Jersey, and became an Eagle Scout in Troop 32 of Saint Elizabeth's Catholic Church in Linden on January 27, 1959. He has stated that his passion for Scouting is one of the things that got him through his 6.5 years as a POW in North Vietnam, to the point that at times all he could remember was the Scout Oath, but not the names of his family members.

Both of Coker's older brothers were involved in Scouting and Coker first became involved when he joined Cub Scouts in late 1951. He completed the Cubbing program and joined Troop 32. Troop 32 had about a dozen members at that time but had over 60 members when Coker made Eagle Scout in 1959. During this time the troop formed an Explorer Post and Sea Scout unit. After making Eagle Scout, Coker joined the Sea Scout unit and worked at Camp Winnebago BSA before the joined the Navy in October 1963. When Coker returned to Linden after being released from captivity, the Scouts were his biggest supporter. Troop 32 now had over 100 members. Local citizens turned out by the hundreds to greet him. Coker visited many of the local Scouting units. Coker was then inactive in Scouting during a busy Naval career, but got involved again when his son joined Cub Scouts as a Tiger Cub after the family had settled in Virginia Beach, Virginia. He became the den leader of 7 boys, all of whom earned their Arrow of Light, the highest recognition in Cub Scouting. They moved on to Troop 62, Virginia Beach, in May 1994; with five of them later becoming Eagle Scouts, including his son.

Troop 62's adults asked Coker to become Scoutmaster, a position in which he served for several years. Coker is also a Vigil Honor member of the Order of the Arrow (OA). Coker served as the lodge adviser for Tidewater Council's OA lodge, Blue Heron Lodge, from December 2005 until December 2007. He was honored by the Boy Scouts of America with their Distinguished Eagle Scout Award on August 9, 2005.

== Naval career ==
Coker served as a U.S. Naval flight officer for twenty-three years. He joined the Navy Reserve on October 31, 1963, at Lakehurst, New Jersey, on November 13, 1963, serving until his retirement on September 30, 1986. He entered the Naval Aviation Officer Program and was commissioned and received his Naval Flight Officer Wings on August 15, 1964. Following graduation, he attended Basic Naval Aviation Observer (BNAO) School at NAS Pensacola, Florida, followed by advanced jet navigation training at NAS Glynco, Georgia. He served as Naval Aviation Observer (NAO), and completed additional training as an A-6 Intruder bombardier-navigator.

=== Vietnam War ===
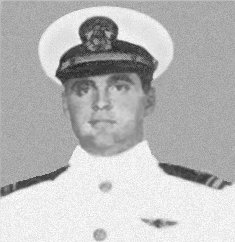
George Thomas Coker in May 1966

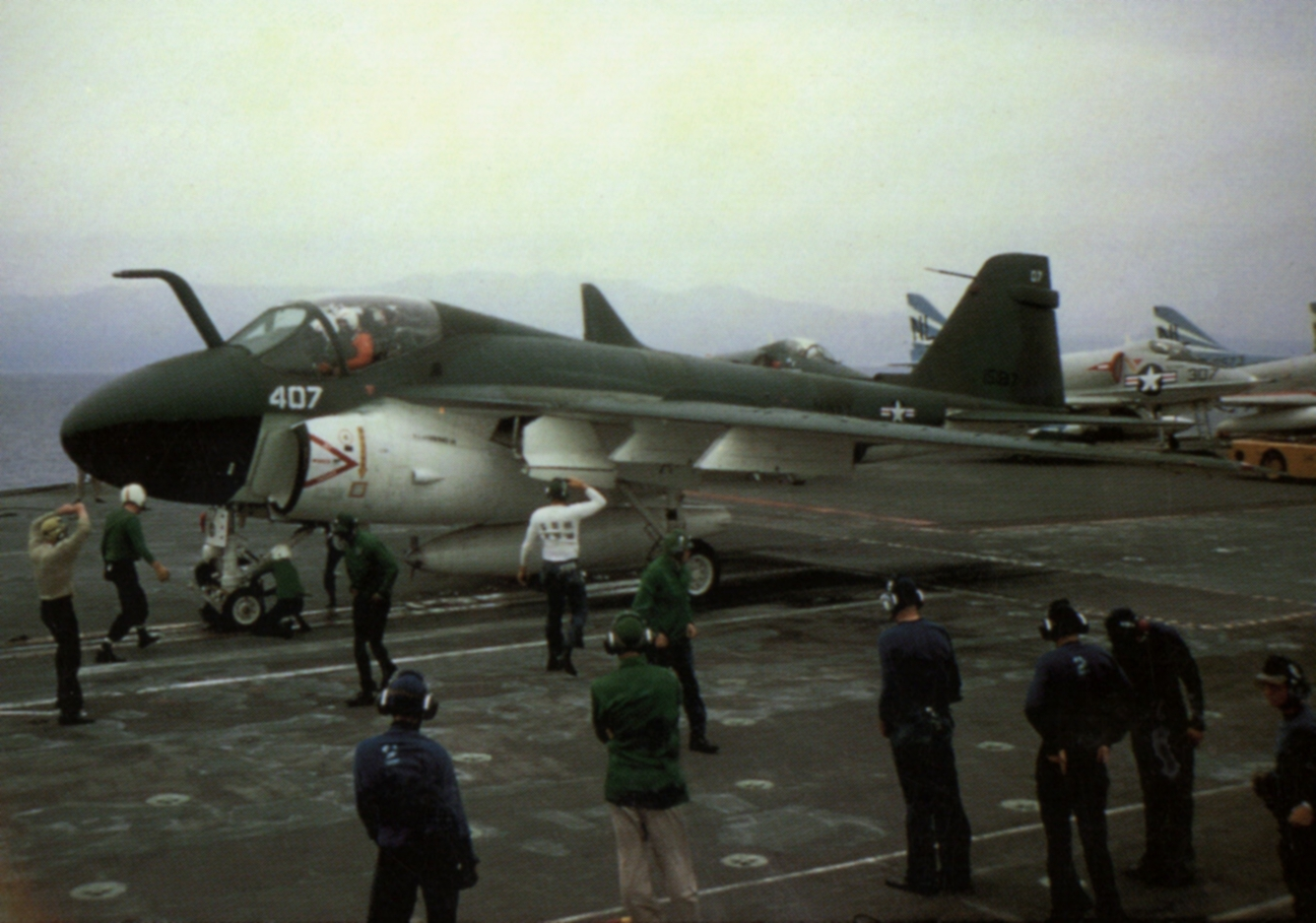
VA-65 A-6A on USS Constellation in 1966

He deployed to Vietnam in 1966 with Attack Squadron 65 (VA-65) aboard the USS Constellation. On June 30, his first deployment, Coker took part in a 19-aircraft attack on a radar control facility in Kép, 38 miles (61 km) northeast of Hanoi. In the face of flak, automatic weapons fire and extremely difficult weather conditions, Coker directed the pilot, navigated his aircraft, managed the ordnance system and used his electronic countermeasures equipment to provide protection for the strike group. The attack inflicted significant damage on the well-protected and dug-in radar station and its equipment, with all three radar stations out of operation and the target described as "obliterated". For his actions, Coker was awarded the Navy Commendation Medal with Combat "V".

Coker was awarded the Distinguished Flying Cross for his actions the following day, July 1. His jet aircraft was diverted to attack three North Vietnamese torpedo boats in the Gulf of Tonkin that were heading towards U.S. Navy destroyers in the area. Coker navigated to the scene and called out airspeed, altitude and dive angle to allow the pilot to focus their attacks on the enemy boats as they in turn concentrated their fire at Coker's aircraft. One enemy ship was hit and sunk, and a second suffered a near-miss. The citation notes that "Lieutenant Coker's resourcefulness, superb airmanship, and courage in the face of great danger contributed materially to the success of the mission." In a two-hour-long battle, all three ships were sunk by the U.S. Navy aircraft.

Coker was awarded the Navy Commendation Medal for his actions as part of a coordinated 23-aircraft attack on petroleum storage tanks in Hai Phong on August 2, 1966, consisting of four waves of A-6 Intruders and A-4 Skyhawks, releasing a combination of 750 and 1,000 pound bombs and firing rockets. The attack was the third in a series of attacks on North Vietnamese oil storage depots dating back to June. Despite heavy anti-aircraft fire, Coker provided accurate guidance to the pilot on airspeed, altitude and dive angle, while operating both the attack navigation radar system and electronic countermeasures. Despite adverse weather conditions, Coker's actions contributed to an attack that destroyed all but one of the facility's storage tanks.

=== Prisoner of war ===
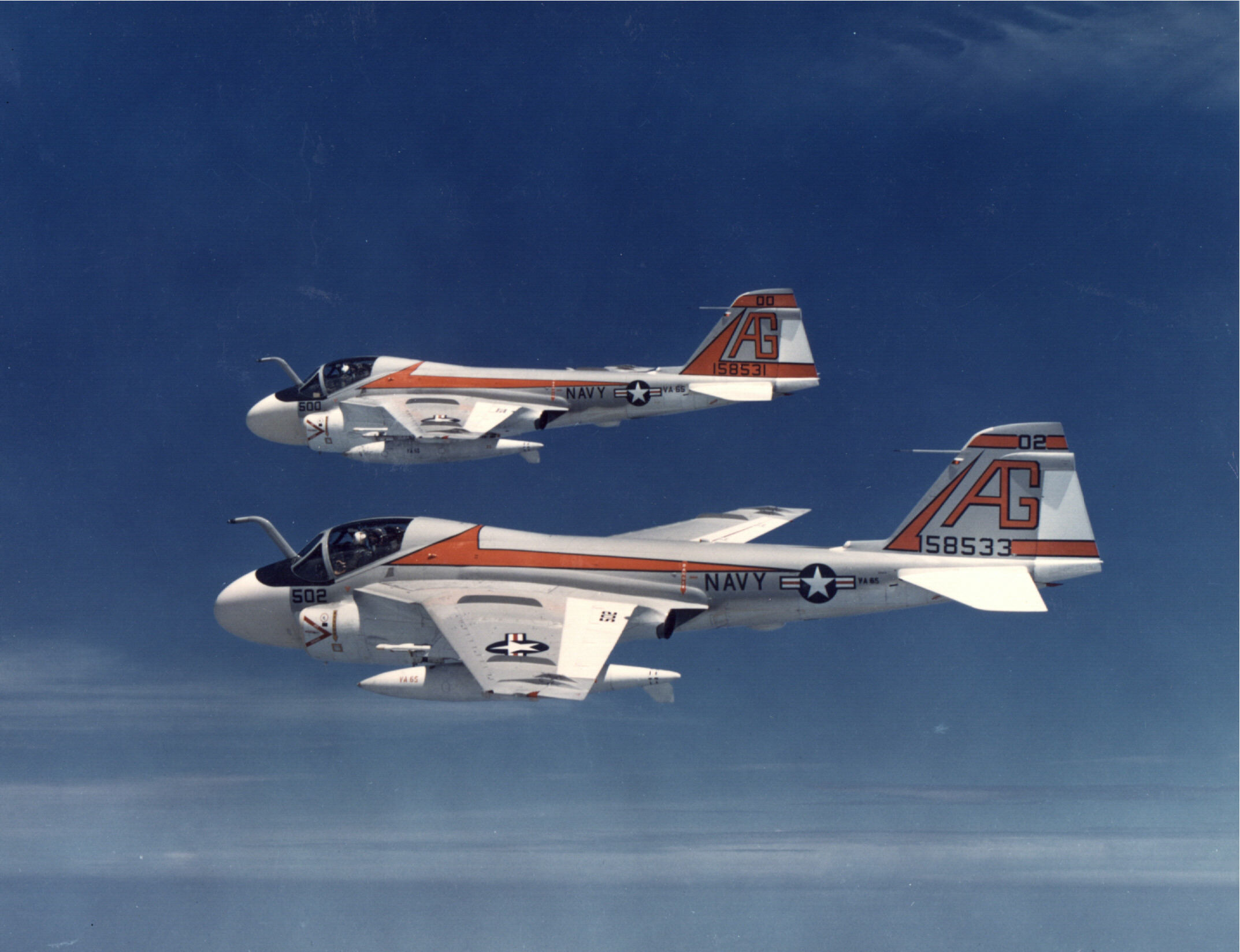
A-6 Intruders flown by VA-65 in 1972

On Coker's 55th bombing mission, he and his pilot, John H. "Jack" Fellowes, were shot down over North Vietnam on August 27, 1966, while flying near Vinh in Nghệ An Province. The aircraft was hit by a surface-to-air missile, which blew off the right wing, and the two crewmembers ejected from the aircraft. Their wingman tracked the parachutes as the crew descended, but lost sight of them due to poor visibility and flak after the crew were within 50 feet (15 m) of the ground. Ejection was at about 2,000 feet (610 m) altitude and 18 miles (29 km) inland in flat terrain. Coker and Fellowes landed about one mile apart. Fellowes landed on a hillside and Coker in a large rice paddy in a well-populated area. Both were captured by armed villagers soon after landing. For three hours after they ejected, American aircraft made a thorough search, despite moderate to heavy flak, but were unable to spot the parachutes or get a signal from their emergency beepers.

Coker was held by the North Vietnamese at a number of different POW camps in the Hanoi area, including Cu Loc, Dirty Bird, Alcatraz Grove, the Zoo, Little Vegas and Hỏa Lò Prison (the "Hanoi Hilton").

While in a facility on the outskirts of Hanoi known as "The Zoo", he was forced to endure a torture called "the wall", in which he, as well as other prisoners of war, were forced to stand facing a wall in his cell with his hands above his head from the time a gong sounded at 5:30 in the morning until it sounded again at 10:00 at night. After two weeks, the knee injury he suffered when he ejected had worsened, and he was taken to a hospital where the infection was drained. After a two-day respite while he recuperated, "the wall" torture continued for two more months. Coker called this "probably my worst experience in Vietnam".

During his captivity, Coker was notable for the ferocity with which he resisted his incarceration. Coker was considered one of "the baddest of the baddest" of the POWs, a reference to his stubborn resistance to his captivity. Coker's Silver Star citation cited his fierce resistance as one of the significant reasons the North Vietnamese eventually abandoned harsh treatment of the prisoners. Coker served as chaplain to his fellow prisoners while he was in captivity, providing them with spiritual guidance and constructive counseling. For these efforts, he was awarded the Legion of Merit.

In July 1967, Coker devised "unusual and ingenious methods" to allow his fellow prisoners to communicate with each other within their camp, assisting their collective efforts to resist their captor's demands and improving the morale of American and Allied POWs. For his "heroic achievement", Coker was awarded the Bronze Star Medal with Combat "V".

That year, Coker and Air Force Captain George McKnight (another of the "baddest") conceived an escape plan. The two would escape from their cells and make it to the nearby Red River, swim by night and hide by day, estimating that it would take three or four days to reach the mouth of the river. There they would commandeer a boat and make it out to sea where they hoped to flag down a ship of the United States Seventh Fleet, estimating that it would take eight days from their escape until their rescue. The two removed the hinges from their cell and escaped from Dirty Bird prison in Hanoi the night of October 12, 1967, climbed to the roof of the prison block and jumped to another roof to escape. They tied themselves together to avoid separation and jumped into the Red River near the Tanwa Bridge. That night they made it 15 miles (24 km) downstream in the dark and hid in the mud on the river's edge at daybreak. The two were recaptured 12 1/2 hours after they had escaped when they were spotted by fishermen along the shore early that morning and were handed over to soldiers. They were held in irons at Hỏa Lò prison before being returned to Dirty Bird a few days later. Their effort made them two of the very few POWs to ever escape from a North Vietnamese POW camp. Coker was awarded the Navy's second-highest award for heroism, for his actions in his attempted escape as a prisoner of war.

His citation for the Navy Cross reads in part:

Navy Cross

... for extraordinary heroism during an extremely daring escape from a solitary confinement cell while a Prisoner of War in Hanoi, North Vietnam on October 12, 1967. During a period of particularly harsh treatment, Lieutenant Commander Coker and another prisoner executed an escape as a two-man team despite the high risk of brutal reprisal or possible loss of life. That night, after opening the cell door by removing door bolt brackets from inside the room, he proceeded over the wall and through several blocks of housing to the Domer Bridge. Walking under the bridge to the Red River's edge, he swam downstream all night and at sunrise buried himself in a mudbank in an effort to remain concealed. He was later discovered, recaptured, severely beaten for many hours, and banished to solitary confinement for two and a half years.

On October 25, 1967, Coker was one of 11 of the most effective resisters, among the 267 POWs then held, who were placed in a special facility in a courtyard behind the North Vietnamese Ministry of National Defense, soon nicknamed "Alcatraz", located about one mile away from Hỏa Lò Prison. Coker and McKnight were added to nine prisoners who had been at a facility nicknamed "Vegas": Jeremiah Denton, Harry Jenkins, Sam Johnson, James Mulligan, Howard Rutledge, Robert Shumaker, James Stockdale, Ronald Storz and Nels Tanner. While most of those among the Alcatraz 11 were senior officers, Coker was the youngest and most junior of those isolated from the other POWs. The 11, known as the "Alcatraz Gang", were separated from other captives and placed in solitary confinement for their leadership in resisting their captors. In Alcatraz, each of the 11 men were kept in solitary confinement. Coker spent two years alone in a windowless concrete cell measuring 3 feet (0.91 m) by 9 feet (2.7 m) that had a light bulb kept on around the clock. He was locked each night in irons by a guard. Coker remained in Alcatraz until December 9, 1969, and spent the next three years in captivity shuffled between a number of prisons.

=== Operation Homecoming ===
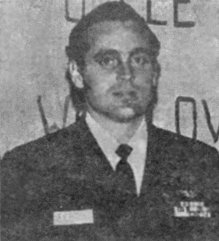
George Thomas Coker shortly after his release from the POW camps in North Vietnam; March 1973.

On March 4, 1973, both Coker and Fellowes were released as part of Operation Homecoming. Vietnam-era POWs were released by order of capture and Fellowes and Coker were in the second large release group, about No. 123 and #124. Of their 2,382 days in captivity (6.5 years), 2.5 years were in solitary confinement and 2.5 years in the "Hanoi Hilton". They also spent time in several other POW camps around Hanoi. Fellowes retired from the Navy in July 1986 and Coker on October 1, 1986.

Coker was promoted to full lieutenant during his captivity and retroactively designated as a Naval Flight Officer (NFO), all NAOs having been redesignated as NFOs during his captivity. Coker was awarded six decorations at a ceremony at NAS North Island in San Diego, California: Navy Cross, Silver Star, Legion of Merit, two Bronze Star Medals, and the Navy Commendation Medal. In 1974, Mayor John T. Gregorio presented him with a key to the city of Linden. Coker was also awarded the Meritorious Service Medal for his "aggressive leadership" as Director of the Atlantic Fleet Command Center upon retiring from the navy in September 1986.

In October 1973, Coker presented scenarios to the National League of Families in which a flyer might deliberately obfuscate the observed deaths of fellow flyers, thus converting what otherwise would be a Killed In Action classification into a false Missing In Action classification. He also told the National League of Families that the circumstances of flyers lost over remote, rugged, jungle terrain meant “‘You’re going to say suddenly the likelihood of a POW in Laos is near zero.’”

== Post-naval service ==
In addition to continued Scouting activities, Coker has been involved in supporting ex–POWs for many years. In December 2004, he was elected commander of his local POW chapter, the Tidewater ex-POW Association. In 2008, he was also serving as the head of a Virginia state ex–POW association. Coker and his wife are also active in church and civic activities, such as counseling young married couples. Coker still has nightmares from his time as a POW. Reflecting on his wartime experiences in a Veterans Day tribute to POWs, he said "If you're never tested, you don't know ... You're capable of a great deal more than you realize, if you really set your mind to it. Look at me. I did it, and there's nothing special about me. I'm just another guy." Coker went on to say part of that is "realizing there's something bigger than yourself".

=== Tributes ===
- The 1974 documentary film Hearts and Minds, which was critical of the United States' role in the Vietnam War, featured Coker briefly. Coker, at the time of filming, had recently returned from six and a half years of internment, torture and mistreatment in North Vietnamese camps for American prisoners of war. The film shows a homecoming parade in his honor in his hometown of Linden, New Jersey, where he tells the assembled crowd on the steps of city hall that, if the need arose, they must be ready to send him back to war. Answering a student's question about what Vietnam looked like, he responded: "Well, if it wasn't for the people, it was very pretty. The people over there are very backward and very primitive, and they just make a mess out of everything." Time magazine's Stefan Kanfer criticized the lack of balance in the film's portrayal of Coker, noting that "[t]he camera, which amply records the agonies of South Vietnamese political prisoners, seems uninterested in the American lieutenant's experience of humiliation and torture."
- Coker is one of the names of fellow POW's that future Senator John McCain recites in the 2005 film, Faith of My Fathers, a film based on the 1999 McCain memoir of the same title, Faith of My Fathers.
- A fellow POW, Commander Paul Galanti, said "George is one of my heroes ... but the real reason we're home is the bad guys wanted to get Coker out of the country. So, you see, George Coker is the real reason we were released."

== Military awards ==
Coker's decorations and awards include:

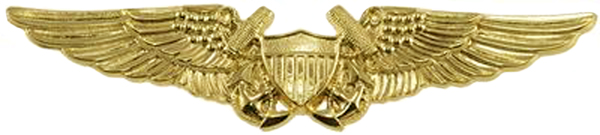

Naval Flight Officer insignia
Navy Cross	Silver Star	Legion of Merit w/ Combat "V"
Distinguished Flying Cross	Bronze Star w/ Combat "V" one 5/16" Gold Star	Purple Heart w/ one 5/16" Gold Star
Meritorious Service Medal	Air Medal w/ Strike/Flight Numeral 5	Navy and Marine Corps Commendation Medal w/ Combat "V" two 5/16" Gold Stars
Combat Action Ribbon	Navy Unit Commendation	Prisoner of War Medal
National Defense Service Medal w/ one 3/16" Bronze Star	Vietnam Service Medal w/ two 3/16" silver stars and two 3/16" bronze stars	Navy and Marine Corps Sea Service Deployment Ribbon
Republic of Vietnam Gallantry Cross Unit Citation w/ Palm and Frame	Republic of Vietnam Civil Actions Medal w/ Palm and Frame	Vietnam Campaign Medal

== See also ==
- List of Eagle Scouts (Boy Scouts of America)
