= Leon F. "Lee" Ellis =

Air Force colonel

Leon Francis Ellis, Jr.
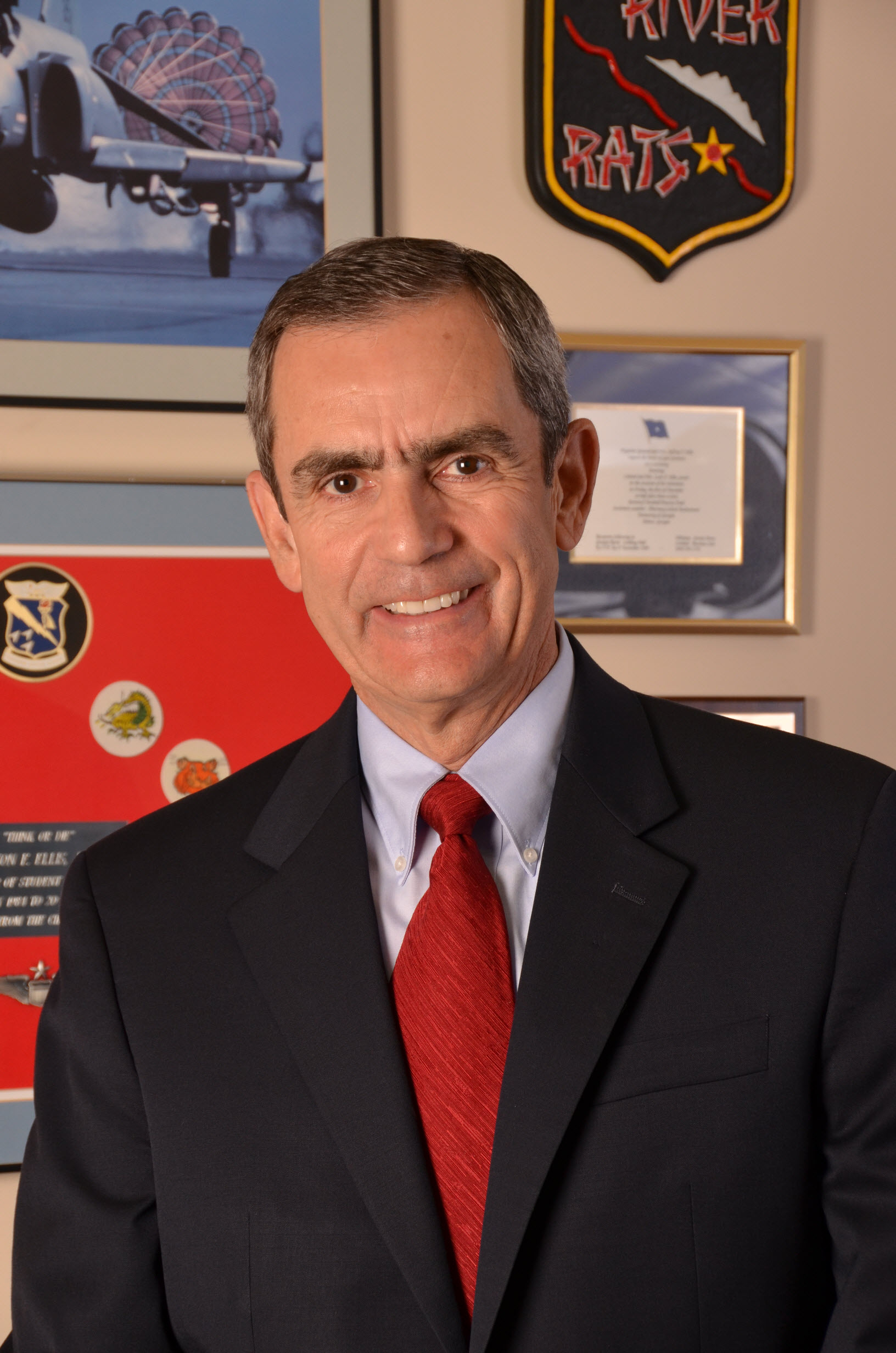
- Born: October 9, 1943 (age 83); Commerce, Georgia, U.S.
- Relatives: Mary Ellis (Wife); Patrick, Kristy, Lance and Meredith (Children)
- Military career
- Allegiance: United States of America
- Branch: United States Air Force
- Service years: 1965–1990
- Rank: Colonel
- Unit: 366th Tactical Fighter Wing
- Commands: 560th Flying Training Squadron; USAF ROTC Detachment University of Georgia
- Conflicts: Vietnam War
- Awards: Silver Star (2); Legion of Merit (2); Bronze Star (2); Purple Heart; Meritorious Service Medal (4); Air Medal (9)
- Other work: Founder and President of Leadership Freedom LLC and FreedomStar Media

Leon Francis "Lee" Ellis (born October 9, 1943) is a retired United States Air Force colonel, author, speaker, and consultant. Ellis gained notoriety when, as a fighter pilot in the Vietnam War, he was shot down, captured, and spent 5 1/2 years as a prisoner of war in Hanoi and surrounding areas with former presidential candidate and Senator John McCain (R-AZ) and others. His capture occurred on November 7, 1967, and he was released on March 14, 1973. He was one of the youngest, junior members in the camps. Ellis is an international speaker and consultant on the subjects of leadership and human performance, organizational integrity, operational effectiveness, and personal accountability. He frequently consults with various organizations—from small businesses to Fortune 500 organizations on these subjects. Ellis' latest book, Leadership Behavior DNA: Discovering Natural Talents and Managing Differences was published in 2020 with co-author Hugh Massie. Engage with Honor: Building a Culture of Courageous Accountability published in 2016 and his last book, Leading with Honor: Leadership Lessons from the Hanoi Hilton published in 2012, share his POW experience and the leadership principles that helped him and his compatriots resist, survive, and return with honor. His previous book, Leading Talents, Leading Teams, was published by Northfield Publishing and shares in-depth team concepts on how to lead and manage based on individual, innate gifts and talents. Additionally, Lee has co-authored three additional books and workbooks on career planning.

== Early life ==
Ellis was born in Commerce, Georgia, to Leon and Molene Ellis. His father was a food service manager at the University of Georgia, and his mother was a middle school science teacher. He has one brother, Robert Ellis. Ellis had early memories of being interested in airplanes and flying. He recalls a moment at 5-years old when he climbed on a World War II airplane in a local park and told his parents this is what he wanted to do when he grew up. His parents encouraged his early interest in flying. He went to Ila Elementary and Commerce High School; and though he maintained good grades, he admittedly was not a disciplined student. He lettered in multiple sports including football, basketball, and baseball and was a good athlete.

After high school, Ellis attended the University of Georgia in Athens and enrolled in Air Force ROTC. He graduated with a B.A. degree in History while pursuing his passion for a military aviation career. Upon graduation from the University of Georgia in 1965, he was selected as a Distinguished Graduate of AFROTC and was commissioned as a second lieutenant in the United States Air Force.

== Military service ==
Ellis entered pilot training program at Moody Air Force Base, Valdosta, Georgia. Fifty-three weeks later he received his Wings and an assignment to combat training in the F-4C Phantom fighter bomber with follow-on orders to Vietnam. In addition to his academic achievements mentioned above, Ellis also graduated from the Armed Forces Staff College and the Air War College, and earned a Master of Science Degree in Counseling and Human Development from Troy University in Montgomery, Alabama.

=== POW experience ===
After arriving in Vietnam, Ellis was assigned to execute bombing raids in North Vietnam, one of the heaviest guarded regions of the country. On his 53rd mission, he and aircraft commander, Captain Ken Fisher, received serious damage to their F-4C Phantom aircraft. Both men had to eject from the fighter jet and were immediately captured on the ground when they landed with their parachutes. After two weeks of traveling through various regions in a Vietnamese military vehicle, they arrived at the Hoa Loa Prison in Hanoi, Vietnam (also known as the Hanoi Hilton). Hoa Loa was an old French Bastille prison fortified strongly to keep prisoners from escaping. For the next 9 months, Lee and three other comrades shared 6'x7.5' cell.

Over the next 5 ½ years, Ellis' described his POW experience as "moments of boredom interrupted by stark moments of terror." In addition to physically torturing prisoners for information, the prison would broadcast anti-American propaganda several times a day throughout the entire camp as a means of breaking their spirit and confidence. Ellis and his comrades began using several forms of subversive communication to stay in touch with each other without being caught. Ellis became one of the key communicators in the camps using a tap code system used by American World War II POWs in Germany. (This was also highlighted in Arthur Koestler's book about the Soviet Gulags, Darkness at Noon). The code uses a 5x5 matrix composed of the 26 letters of the alphabet, with K and C being the same tap code. For example, the word "Hi" would consist of two taps, then three taps for "H"; and two taps, then four taps for "I". The POWs tapped letters and words through the thick walls to form messages that each cell would pass along to the next.

Some of Ellis' fellow senior ranking officers in the camps were Colonel Robbie Risner USAF, CAPT Jeremiah Denton USN, and CAPT Jim Stockdale USN. In the prison camps, frequently the senior-ranking officers received the first and most harsh treatment in an effort to obtain propaganda and information. Much of the torture abuse was aimed at discouraging the senior officers from carrying out leadership duties.

Prisoners of war were released from the camps in order of capture through Operation Homecoming. On March 14, 1973, Lee and several comrades, including Sen. John McCain (R-AZ), were flown from Vietnam to Clark Air Base, Philippines. From there, Ellis and others eventually landed at Maxwell Air Force Base in Montgomery, Alabama, where he was reunited with his family. Ellis was single at the time of his capture.

=== Later career ===
After repatriation he returned to flying duties with increasing positions of leadership. Rising to the rank of colonel before retirement, Ellis's assignments included duty as a pilot, flight instructor, staff officer, chief of flight standardization and evaluation, flying squadron commander, and supervisor in higher education. He supervised, educated, and trained officers for the last 17 years of his U.S. Air Force career. Ellis served as the Vice Commandant of the Squadron Officer School, the Air Force's leadership school for captains. He completed his Air Force career as professor of aerospace studies and commander of Air Force ROTC at the University of Georgia, retiring with almost twenty-five years of service.

== Awards and decorations ==
Ellis is a command pilot whose decorations include the Silver Star with one Oak Leaf Cluster; the Legion of Merit with one Oak Leaf Cluster; the Bronze Star with Valor Device; the Meritorious Service Medal with two Oak Leaf Clusters; the Purple Heart; the Air Medal with eight Oak Leaf Clusters; and the Prisoner of War Medal. In addition, he was awarded four Air Force Commendation Medals and four Meritorious Service Medals for performance excellence. He retired after 24 years of service with the rank of colonel. He was selected in 1975 as the Air Force nominee for the U.S. Junior Chamber of Commerce's "Ten Outstanding Men of the Year" Award.

US Air Force Command Pilot Badge
Silver Star with bronze oak leaf cluster
Legion of Merit with bronze oak leaf cluster	Bronze Star Medal with Valor device and bronze oak leaf cluster	Purple Heart
Meritorious Service Medal with three bronze oak leaf clusters	Air Medal with one silver and three bronze oak leaf clusters	Air Force Commendation Medal
Air Force Presidential Unit Citation	Air Force Outstanding Unit Award with Valor device and three bronze oak leaf clusters	Air Force Organizational Excellence Award
Prisoner of War Medal	National Defense Service Medal	Vietnam Service Medal with one silver and three bronze campaign stars
Air Force Overseas Short Tour Service Ribbon with silver oak leaf cluster	Air Force Longevity Service Award with silver oak leaf cluster	Small Arms Expert Marksmanship Ribbon
Air Force Training Ribbon	Republic of Vietnam Gallantry Cross Unit Citation	Vietnam Campaign Medal

=== Silver Star citation (1st award) ===
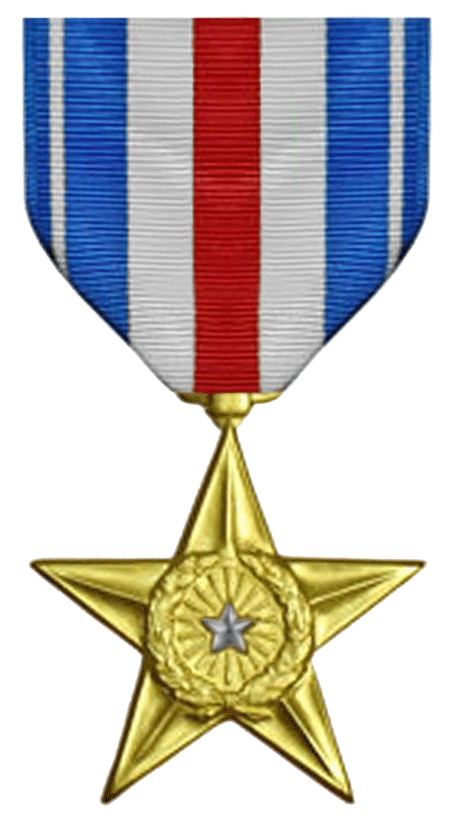

Ellis Jr., Leon F.
First Lieutenant, U.S. Air Force
390th Tactical Fighter Squadron, 366th Tactical Fighter Wing, Pacific Air Force
Date of Action: November 7, 1967

Citation:

The President of the United States of America, authorized by Act of Congress, July 8, 1918 (amended by act of July 25, 1963), takes pleasure in presenting the Silver Star to First Lieutenant Leon Francis Ellis, Jr., United States Air Force, for gallantry in connection with military operations against an opposing armed force as Pilot of an F-4C tactical fighter of the 390th Tactical Fighter Squadron, Da Nang Air Base, Vietnam, Pacific Air Force, assigned to strike a high priority military target in North Vietnam, on 7 November 1967. On that date, Lieutenant Ellis’ aircraft was hit by anti-aircraft fire during his attack. Although his aircraft had burst into flames, without regard to his own personal safety he released his bombs directly on the target. By his gallantry and devotion to duty, Lieutenant Ellis has reflected great credit upon himself and the United States Air Force.

=== Silver Star citation (2nd award) ===
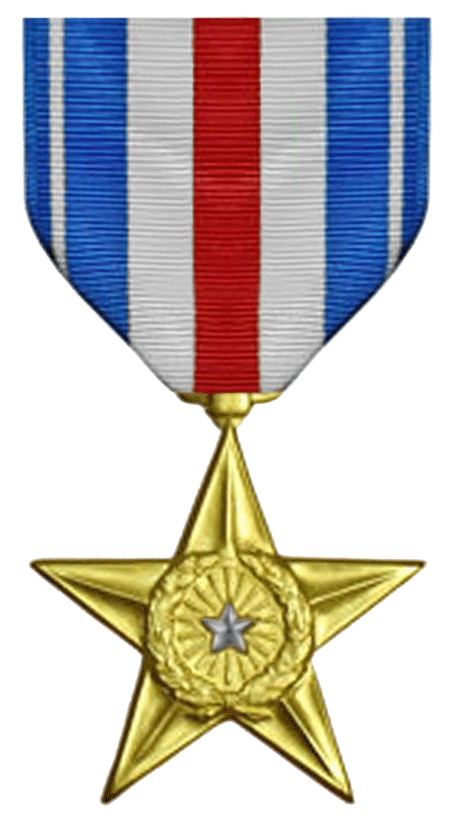

Ellis Jr., Leon F.
Captain, U.S. Air Force
Prisoner of War, North Vietnam
Date of Action: November 12, 1967

Citation:

The President of the United States of America, authorized by Act of Congress, July 8, 1918 (amended by act of July 25, 1963), takes pleasure in presenting a Bronze Oak Leaf Cluster in lieu of a Second Award of the Silver Star to Captain Leon Francis Ellis, Jr., United States Air Force, for gallantry and intrepidity in action in connection with military operations against an opposing armed force on 12 November 1967, while a Prisoner of War in North Vietnam. Ignoring international agreements on treatment of prisoners of war, the enemy resorted to mental and physical cruelties to obtain information, confessions, and propaganda materials. Captain Ellis resisted their demands by calling upon his deepest inner strengths in a manner which reflected his devotion to duty and great credit upon himself and the United States Air Force.

== Post-military career ==
Based on Ellis' previous education and experience with behavioral assessment and human development, he accepted the role as Director of Career/Life Pathways from 1990 – 1998. He led the development team that researched, developed, and validated Career Direct®, a vocational assessment package and two personality assessments with software applications. From 1998 to 2008, he was responsible for product development of three more behavioral and leadership assessments as well as the launch and Internet deployment of these resources through a previously co-owned company, RightPath Resources. He has also developed and released his latest assessment tool, the N8Traits™ Profile. In total, these assessments have been used by more than 200,000 individuals and are the instrument of choice in many organizations, including Fortune 500 companies and nationally recognized not-for-profits. As an author during this period, Ellis has also written three books – Leading with Honor: Leadership Lessons from the Hanoi Hilton, published by his own publishing company, FreedomStar Media™; it has won several awards including a winner in the 2012 International Book Awards in the Business and Management category; 2012 Indie Excellence Awards winner in the Leadership category; 2012 ForeWord Reviews Book of the Year Finalist in the Business and Economics category; and inclusion in the 2013 U.S. Air Force Chief of Staff Reading List. Leading Talents, Leading Teams, published by Northfield Publishing, was written in 2003. He has also co-authored three books and workbooks on career planning with Crown Financial Ministries' co-founder, Larry Burkett. In 2008, Ellis founded a new company, Leadership Freedom® LLC, dba Leading with Honor®, that develops and presents leadership curricula and training focusing on management performance, leadership accountability and principle-based management strategies. In 2011, he founded FreedomStar Media™, a publishing company that provides leadership resources and training.

Ellis is also a keynote speaker and media guest throughout the world on these topics.

== Personal life ==
Ellis and his wife Mary have four grown children and six grandchildren. They reside in the metro area of Atlanta, Georgia.
