= Hỏa Lò Prison =

Vietnamese Prison Camp

Coordinates: 21.0257°N 105.8461°E

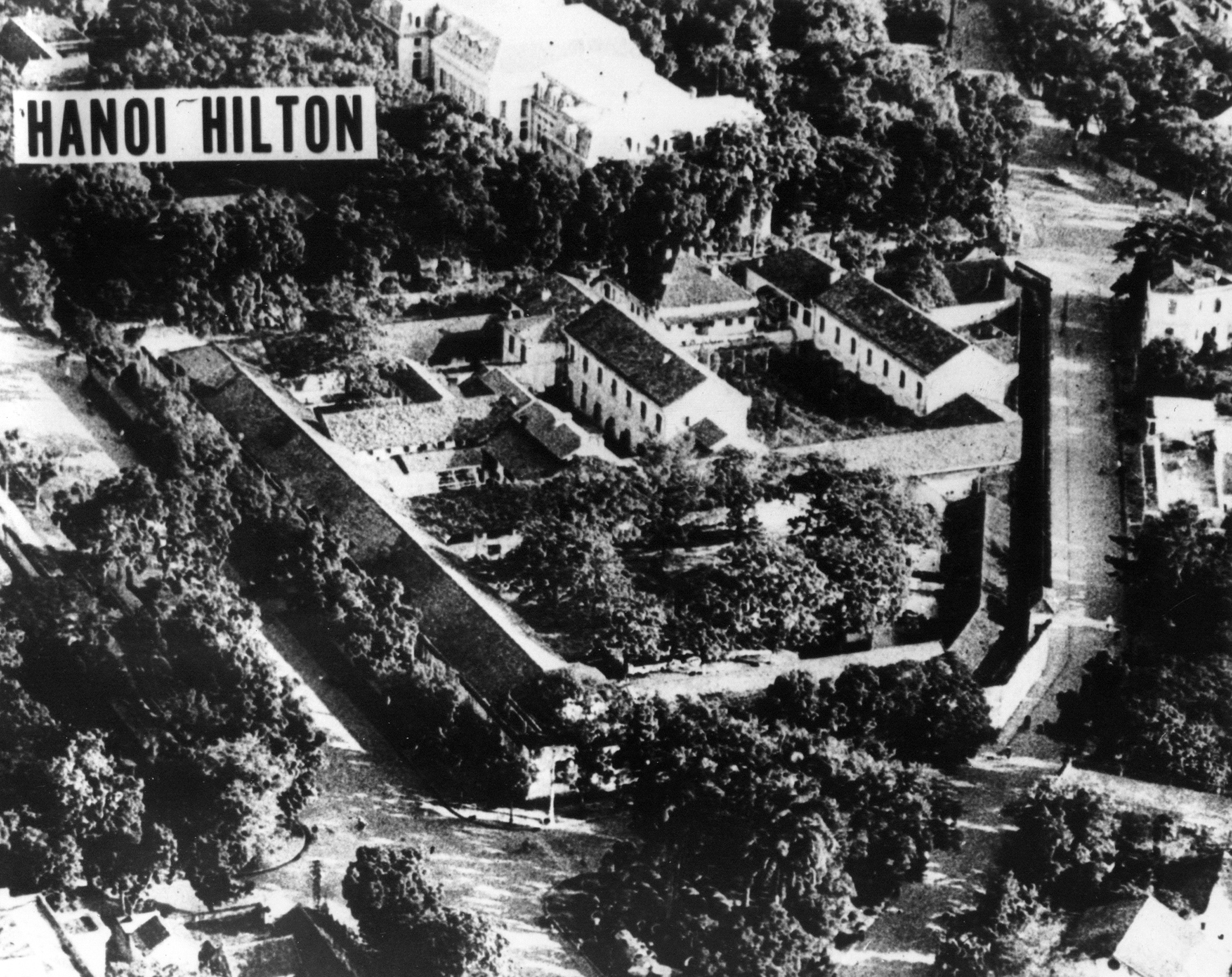
The Hanoi Hilton in a 1970 aerial surveillance photo

Hỏa Lò Prison (Vietnamese: [hwâː lɔ̀], Nhà tù Hỏa Lò; French: Prison Hỏa Lò) was a prison in Hanoi originally used by the French colonists in Indochina for political prisoners, and later by North Vietnam for U.S. prisoners of war during the Vietnam War. During this later period, it was known to American POWs as the "Hanoi Hilton". Following Operation Homecoming, the prison was used to incarcerate Vietnamese dissidents until its demolition between 1993 and 1994. Its gatehouse remains a museum.

== French era ==
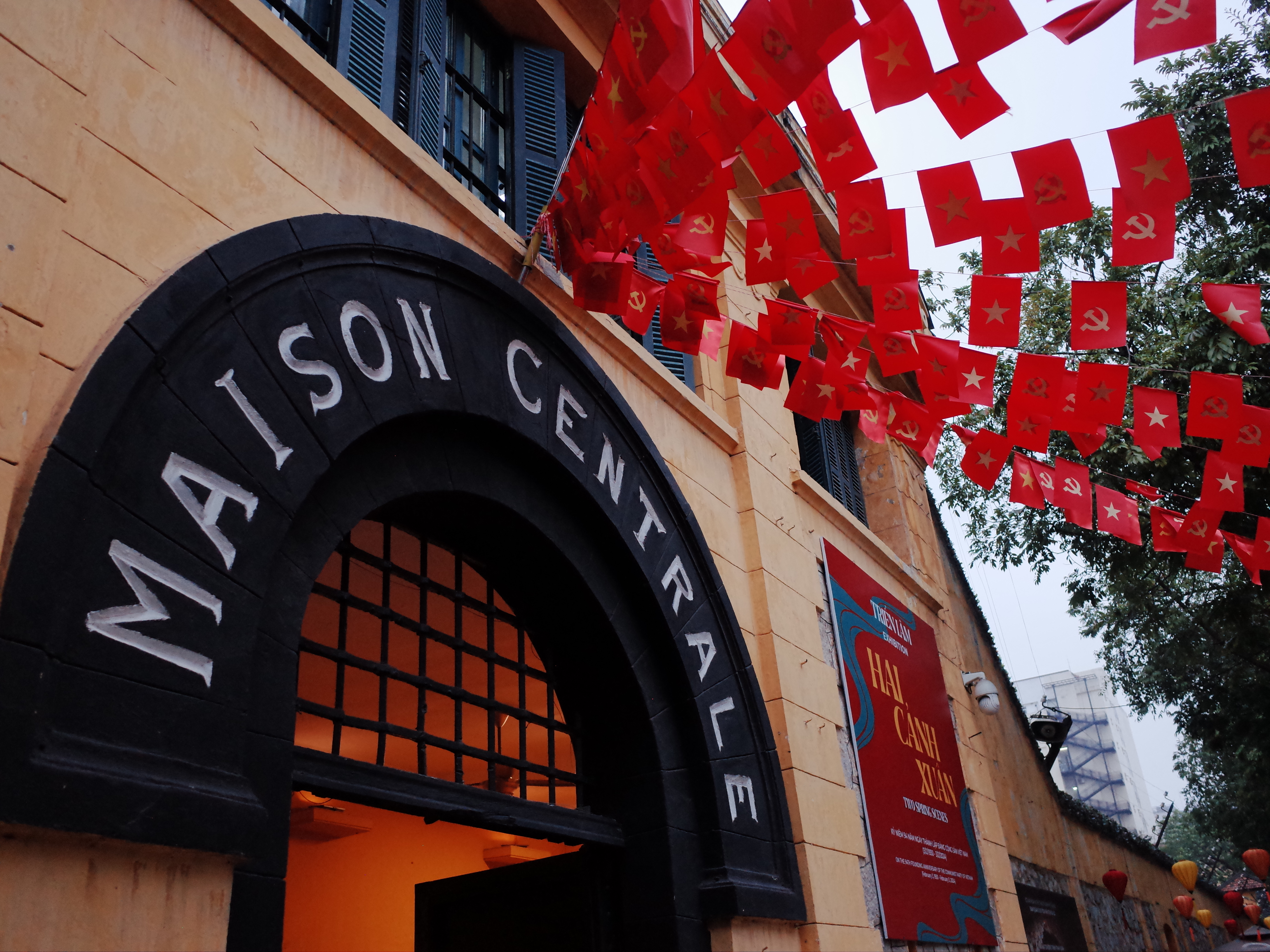
The French name "Maison Centrale" above the gate of Hỏa Lò

Museum reconstruction of First Indochina War prisoners in Hỏa Lò

The name Hỏa Lò, commonly translated as "fiery furnace" or even "Hell's hole", also means "stove". The name originated from the street name phố Hỏa Lò, due to the concentration of stores selling wood stoves and coal-fire stoves along the street in pre-colonial times.

The prison was built in Hanoi by the French between 1896 and 1901, when Vietnam was still part of French Indochina. The French called the prison Maison Centrale, 'Central House', which is still the designation of prisons for dangerous or long sentence detainees in France. It was located near Hanoi's French Quarter. It was intended to hold Vietnamese prisoners, particularly political prisoners agitating for independence who were often subject to torture and execution. A 1913 renovation expanded its capacity from 460 inmates to 600. It was nevertheless often overcrowded, holding some 730 prisoners on a given day in 1916, a figure which rose to 895 in 1922 and 1,430 in 1933. By 1954, it held more than 2000 people; with its inmates held in subhuman conditions, it had become a symbol of colonialist exploitation and the bitterness of the Vietnamese towards the French.

The central urban location of the prison also became part of its early character. During the 1910s through 1930s, street peddlers made an occupation of passing outside messages through the jail's windows and tossing tobacco and opium over the walls; letters and packets would be thrown out to the street in the opposite direction. Within the prison itself, communication and ideas passed. Many of the future leading figures in Communist North Vietnam and Viet Minh spent time in Maison Centrale during the 1930s and 1940s.

Conditions for political prisoners in the "Colonial Bastille" were publicised in 1929 in a widely circulated account by the Trotskyist Phan Van Hum of the experience he shared with the charismatic publicist Nguyen An Ninh.

== Democratic Republic of Vietnam, 1954 ==
Following the defeat at the Battle of Dien Bien Phu and the 1954 Geneva Accords, the French left Hanoi and the prison came under the authority of the Democratic Republic of Vietnam. Thereafter the prison served as an education center for revolutionary doctrine and activity, and it was kept around after the French left to mark its historical significance to the North Vietnamese.

== Vietnam War ==
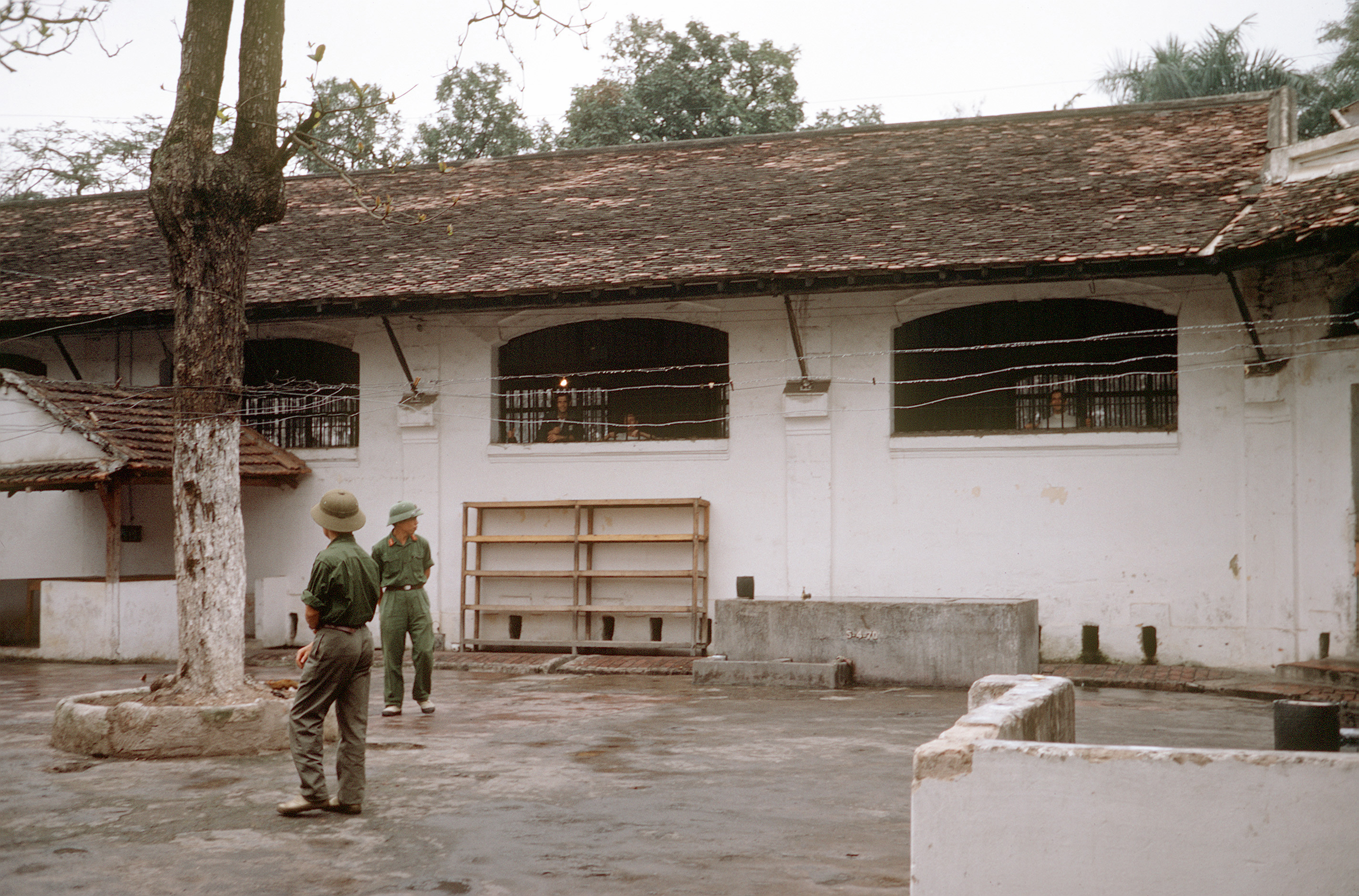
The "Little Vegas" area built for American POWs in 1967, shown in a final inspection in 1973 shortly before the Americans' release

During the Vietnam War, the first U.S. prisoner of war to be sent to Hỏa Lò was Lieutenant Junior Grade Everett Alvarez Jr., who was shot down on August 5, 1964. From the beginning, U.S. POWs endured miserable conditions, including poor food and unsanitary conditions. The prison complex was sarcastically nicknamed the "Hanoi Hilton" by the American POWs, referencing the well-known Hilton Hotel chain. There is some disagreement among the first group of POWs who coined the name but F-8D pilot Bob Shumaker was the first to write it down, carving "Welcome to the Hanoi Hilton" on the handle of a pail to greet the arrival of Air Force Lieutenant Robert Peel.

Beginning in early 1967, a new area of the prison was opened for incoming American POWs; it was dubbed "Little Vegas", and its buildings and areas were named after Las Vegas Strip landmarks, such as "Golden Nugget", "Thunderbird", "Stardust", "Riviera", and the "Desert Inn". These names were chosen because many pilots had trained at Nellis Air Force Base, located in proximity to Las Vegas. American pilots were frequently already in poor condition by the time they were captured, injured either during their ejection or in landing on the ground.

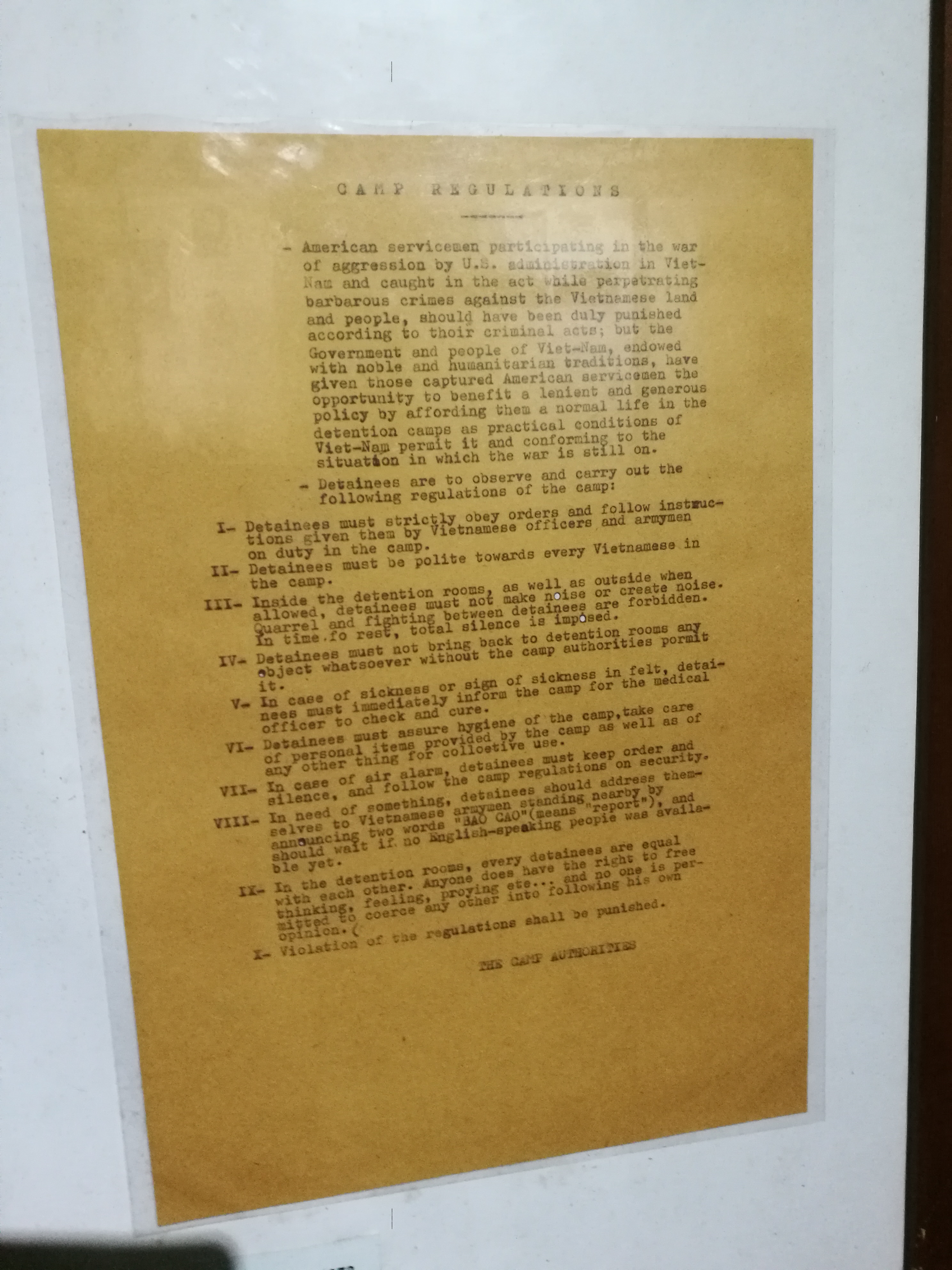
Hỏa Lò Prison Rules

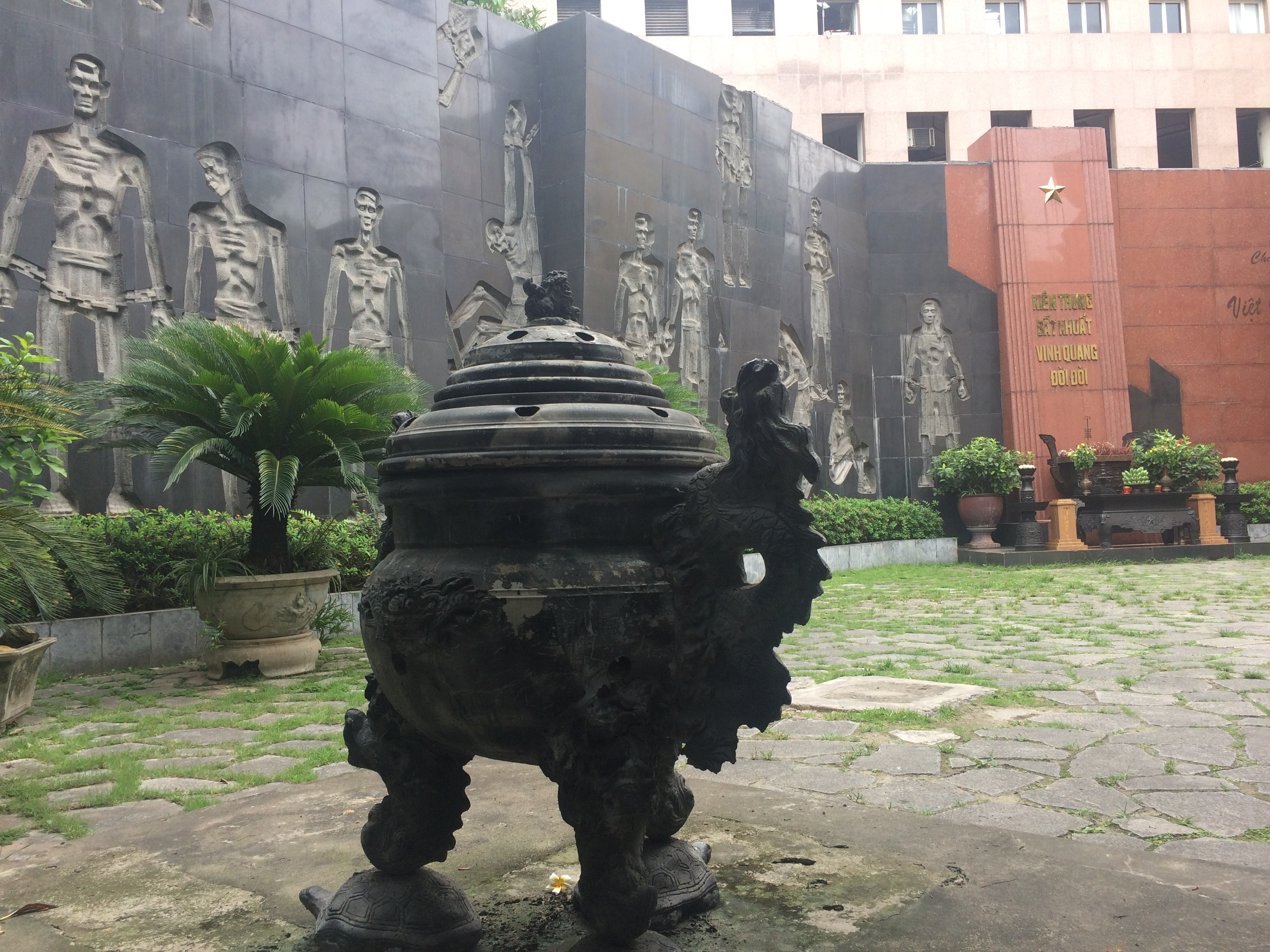
Hỏa Lò Prison memorial

The Hỏa Lò was one site used by the North Vietnamese Army to house, torture, and interrogate captured servicemen, mostly American pilots shot down during bombing raids. North Vietnam had signed the Third Geneva Convention of 1949 which required "decent and humane treatment" of prisoners of war. Severe torture methods were employed, such as rope bindings, irons, beatings, and prolonged solitary confinement. When prisoners of war began to be released from this and other North Vietnamese prisons during the Johnson administration, their testimonies revealed widespread and systematic abuse of prisoners of war. In 1968, Walter Heynowski and Gerhard Scheumann from East Germany filmed in the prison the 4-chapter series Pilots in Pajamas with interviews with American pilots in the prison, which they claimed were unscripted.

Regarding treatment at Hỏa Lò and other prisons, the North Vietnamese countered by stating that prisoners were treated well and in accordance with the Geneva Conventions. During 1969, they broadcast a series of statements from American prisoners that purported to support this notion. The North Vietnamese also maintained that their prisons were no worse than prisons for POWs and political prisoners in South Vietnam, such as the one on Côn Sơn Island. Mistreatment of Viet Cong and North Vietnamese prisoners and South Vietnamese dissidents in South Vietnam's prisons was indeed frequent, as was North Vietnamese abuse of South Vietnamese prisoners and their own dissidents.

Beginning in late 1969, treatment of the prisoners at Hỏa Lò and other camps became less severe and generally more tolerable. Following the late 1970 attempted rescue operation at Sơn Tây prison camp, most of the POWs at the outlying camps were moved to Hỏa Lò, so that the North Vietnamese had fewer camps to protect. This created the "Camp Unity" communal living area at Hỏa Lò, which greatly reduced the isolation of the POWs and improved their morale.

=== Notable inmates ===
- Everett Alvarez Jr., Mexican American, US Navy pilot, the longest-held U.S. POW at Hỏa Lò (over 8 years).
- John L. Borling, USAF pilot, POW for 6 1/2 years, retired major general.
- Charles G. Boyd, USAF pilot, POW for almost 7 years, retired general; the only Vietnam-era POW to reach a four-star rank.
- George Thomas Coker, US Navy pilot.
- Bud Day, USAF pilot, Medal of Honor and Air Force Cross recipient, political activist, was cellmates with McCain.
- Jeremiah Denton, US Navy pilot, Senator (R-AL).
- Leon F. "Lee" Ellis, USAF fighter pilot, motivational speaker, and author.
- Norman C. Gaddis, USAF pilot, POW for almost 7 years, retired Brigadier General.
- Guy Gruters, USAF fighter pilot, motivational speaker, and author.
- Lawrence N. Guarino, U.S. Air Force officer, veteran of three wars, and author.
- Carlyle "Smitty" Harris, U.S. Air Force pilot, POW for almost 8 years. Credited for establishing the "tap code" in which the inmates communicated with each other.
- Doug Hegdahl, inmate who played a fool to memorize all the names, personal information, and capture dates of the prisoners there.
- Sam Johnson, USAF fighter pilot, Representative (R-TX).
- Joe E. Kernan, US Navy pilot, former governor of Indiana.
- Joseph Kittinger, USAF pilot, record-breaking parachutist.
- William P. Lawrence, US Navy pilot, Chief of Naval Personnel and Superintendent of the United States Naval Academy.
- Hayden Lockhart, first Air Force pilot captured in North Vietnam, third American captured.
- John McCain, US Navy pilot, Senator (R-AZ) and 2008 Republican presidential nominee, spent parts of his five and a half years as a POW there.
- James Robinson Risner, USAF fighter pilot, POW from 1965 to 1973. A lieutenant colonel when shot down and captured, he was the senior ranking POW, responsible for maintaining chain of command among his fellow prisoners.
- Howard Rutledge, US Navy pilot, held there for part of his 7 1/2 years of captivity, co-author of In the Presence of Mine Enemies: 1965–1973 – A Prisoner of War with his wife.
- Lance Sijan, USAF fighter pilot, Medal of Honor recipient.
- James Stockdale, US Navy pilot, Medal of Honor recipient, 1992 vice presidential candidate. He and William P. Lawrence were the most senior-ranking US Navy POWs.

=== Post-war accounts ===
After the implementation of the 1973 Paris Peace Accords, neither the United States nor its allies ever formally charged North Vietnam with the war crimes revealed to have been committed there. In the 2000s, the Vietnamese government has had the position that claims that prisoners of war were tortured at Hỏa Lò and other sites during the war are fabricated, but that Vietnam wants to move past the issue as part of establishing better relations with the U.S. Trần Trọng Duyệt, a jailer at Hỏa Lò beginning in 1968 and its commandant for the last three years of the war, maintained in 2008 that no prisoners of war were tortured. This contradicts U.S. Senate reports and extensive testimony from former POWs documenting systematic torture.

After the war, Risner wrote the book Passing of the Night detailing his seven years at Hỏa Lò. A considerable amount of literature emerged from released POWs after repatriation, depicting Hỏa Lò and the other prisons as places where such atrocities as murder, beatings, broken bones, teeth and eardrums, dislocated limbs, starvation, serving of food contaminated with human and animal feces, and medical neglect of infections and tropical disease occurred. These details are revealed in famous accounts by McCain (Faith of My Fathers), Denton, Alvarez, Day, Risner, Stockdale and dozens of others.

In addition, Hỏa Lò was depicted in the 1987 Hollywood movie The Hanoi Hilton.

== Hỏa Lò in the late 1970s and early 1980s ==
The prison continued to be in use after the release of the American prisoners. Among the last inmates was dissident poet Nguyễn Chí Thiện, who was reimprisoned in 1979 after attempting to deliver his poems to the British Embassy, and spent six years in Hỏa Lò until 1985. He mentions the last years of the prison, partly in fictional form, in Hỏa Lò/Hanoi Hilton Stories (2007). The prison remained operational until its 1993 demolition.

== Demolition, conversion and museum ==
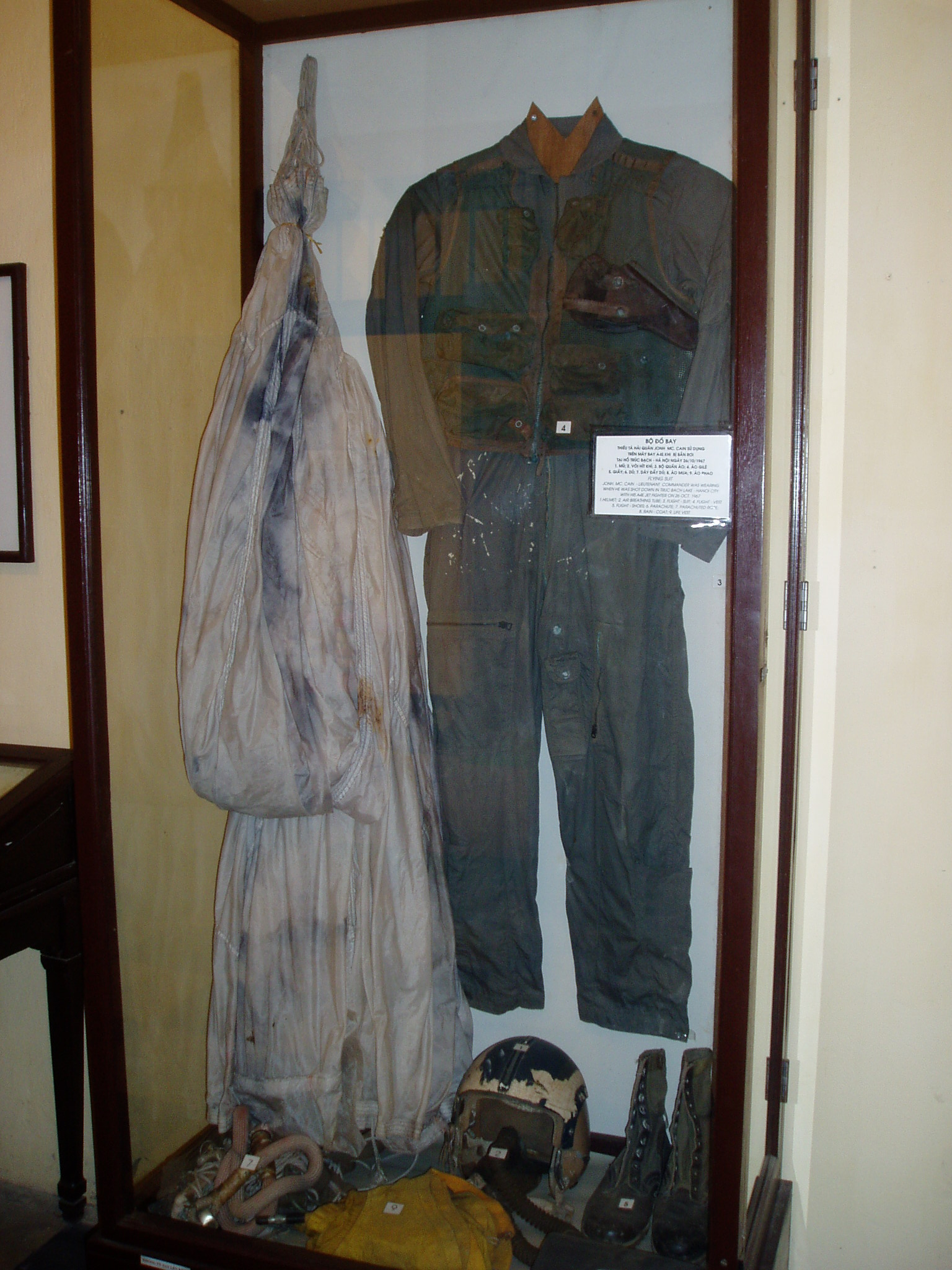
John McCain's flight suit and parachute, on display in the museum part of the Hoa Lo site

Demolition began in 1993 and most of the prison was demolished by 1994. The site now contains a complex of two high-rise buildings called Hanoi Towers or Hanoi Center Tower, consists of a 27-story Somerset Grand Hanoi serviced apartment building and a 14-story office building. Other parts have been converted into a commercial complex retaining the original French colonial walls.

Only part of the prison exists today as a museum. The displays mainly show the prison during the French colonial period, including the guillotine room, still with original equipment, and the quarters for male and female Vietnamese political prisoners. The Vietnam War section occupies one room and has been criticized by U.S. veterans for downplaying POW experiences.

Building materials from several complete cells were saved, including original bricks, cement ceilings, concrete "beds" with ankle shackles, and an original cell door and transom window. After being in storage in Vietnam for six years and nearly another ten in Canada, the cells were reconstructed using the original materials and turned into a permanent exhibit that opened in 2023 at the American Heritage Museum in Stow, Massachusetts, US.
