= In the Presence of Mine Enemies (memoir) =

Vietnam War POW memoir and film

- Author: Howard and Phyllis Rutledge with Mel and Lyla White
- Language: English
- Genre: Autobiography
- Publisher: Baker Publishing
- Publication date: 1973
- Publication place: United States
- Media type: Print (hardcover and paperback)

In the Presence of Mine Enemies: 1965–1973 – A Prisoner of War is a memoir by American pilot Howard E. Rutledge, co-written with his wife Phyllis, and Mel and Lyla White, of his time in a Vietnamese POW camp during the Vietnam War. When it was published it was the first book-length firsthand treatment of the experiences of American prisoners of war in Vietnam. It was made into a documentary in the same year.

After the war, Rutledge was head of the University of Oklahoma's department of naval science and twice ran unsuccessfully for a seat in the U.S. House of Representatives from Oklahoma's 4th congressional district. He died of cancer in Norman, Oklahoma in 1984.
