= 1912 =

1912 in various calendars
- Gregorian calendar: 1912; MCMXII
- Ab urbe condita: 2665
- Armenian calendar: 1361; ԹՎ ՌՅԿԱ
- Assyrian calendar: 6662
- Baháʼí calendar: 68–69
- Balinese saka calendar: 1833–1834
- Bengali calendar: 1318–1319
- Berber calendar: 2862
- British Regnal year: 2 Geo. 5 – 3 Geo. 5
- Buddhist calendar: 2456
- Burmese calendar: 1274
- Byzantine calendar: 7420–7421
- Chinese calendar: 辛亥年 (Metal Pig); 4609 or 4402 — to — 壬子年 (Water Rat); 4610 or 4403
- Coptic calendar: 1628–1629
- Discordian calendar: 3078
- Ethiopian calendar: 1904–1905
- Hebrew calendar: 5672–5673
- Hindu calendars
- Vikram Samvat: 1968–1969
- Shaka Samvat: 1833–1834
- Kali Yuga: 5012–5013
- Holocene calendar: 11912
- Igbo calendar: 912–913
- Iranian calendar: 1290–1291
- Islamic calendar: 1330–1331
- Japanese calendar: Meiji 45 / Taishō 1 (大正元年)
- Javanese calendar: 1841–1842
- Juche calendar: 1
- Julian calendar: Gregorian minus 13 days
- Korean calendar: 4245
- Minguo calendar: ROC 1 民國1年
- Nanakshahi calendar: 444
- Thai solar calendar: 2454–2455
- Tibetan calendar: ལྕགས་མོ་ཕག་ལོ་ (female Iron-Boar); 2038 or 1657 or 885 — to — ཆུ་ཕོ་བྱི་བ་ལོ་ (male Water-Rat); 2039 or 1658 or 886

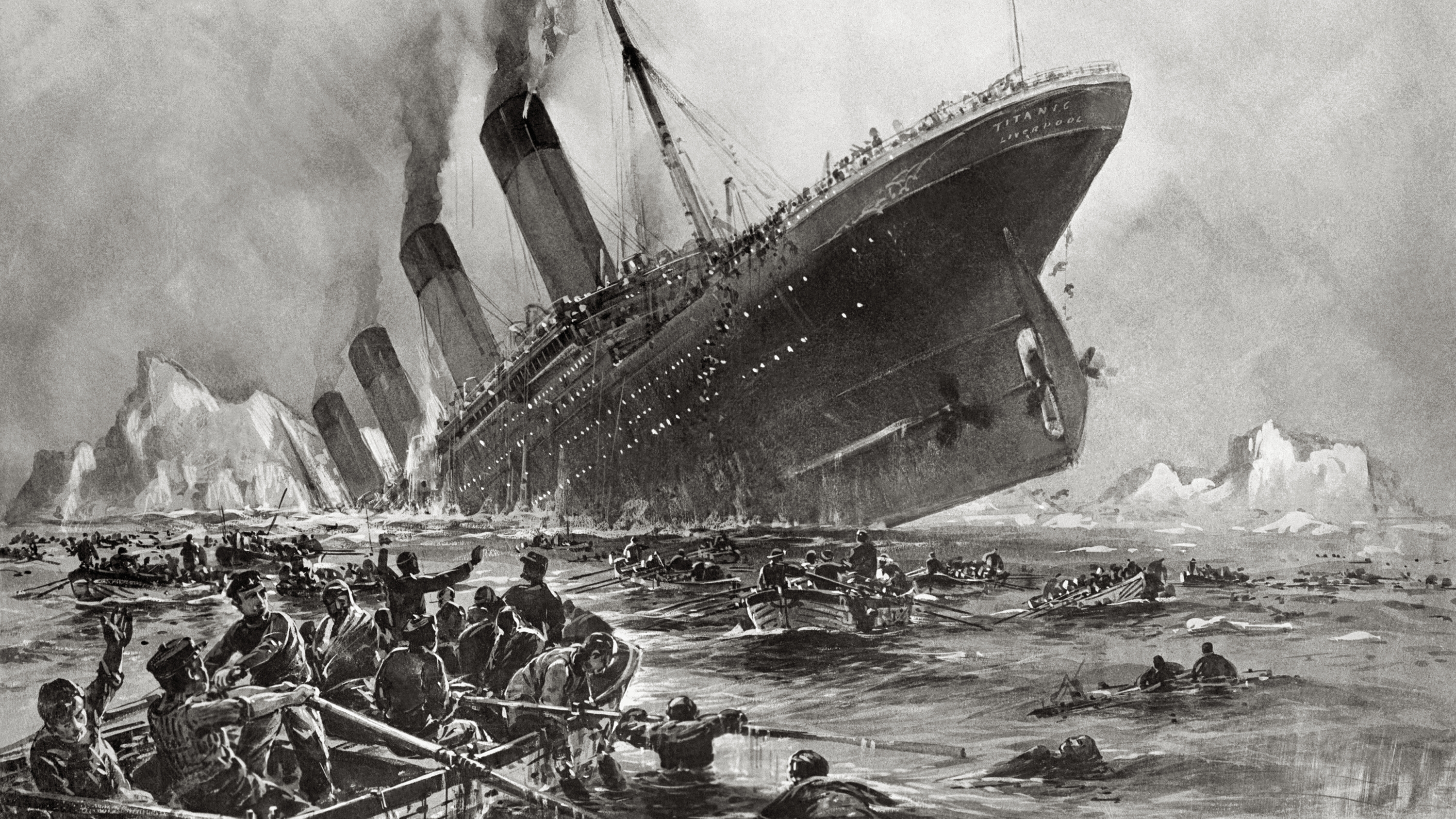
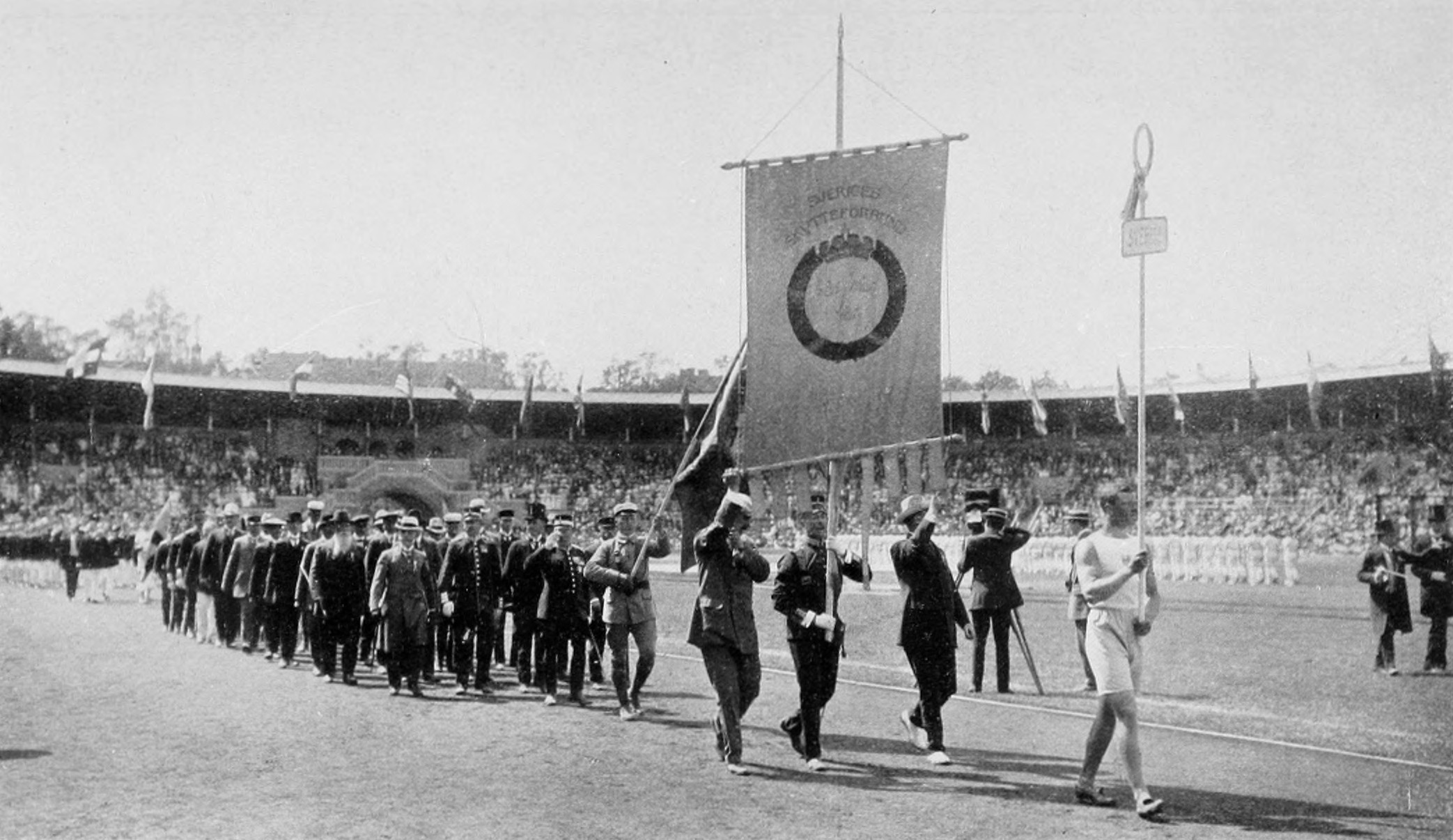
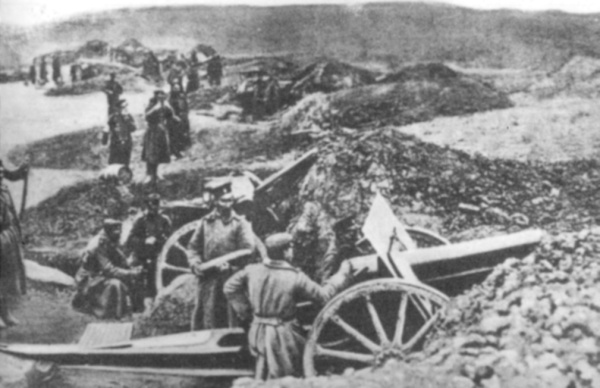
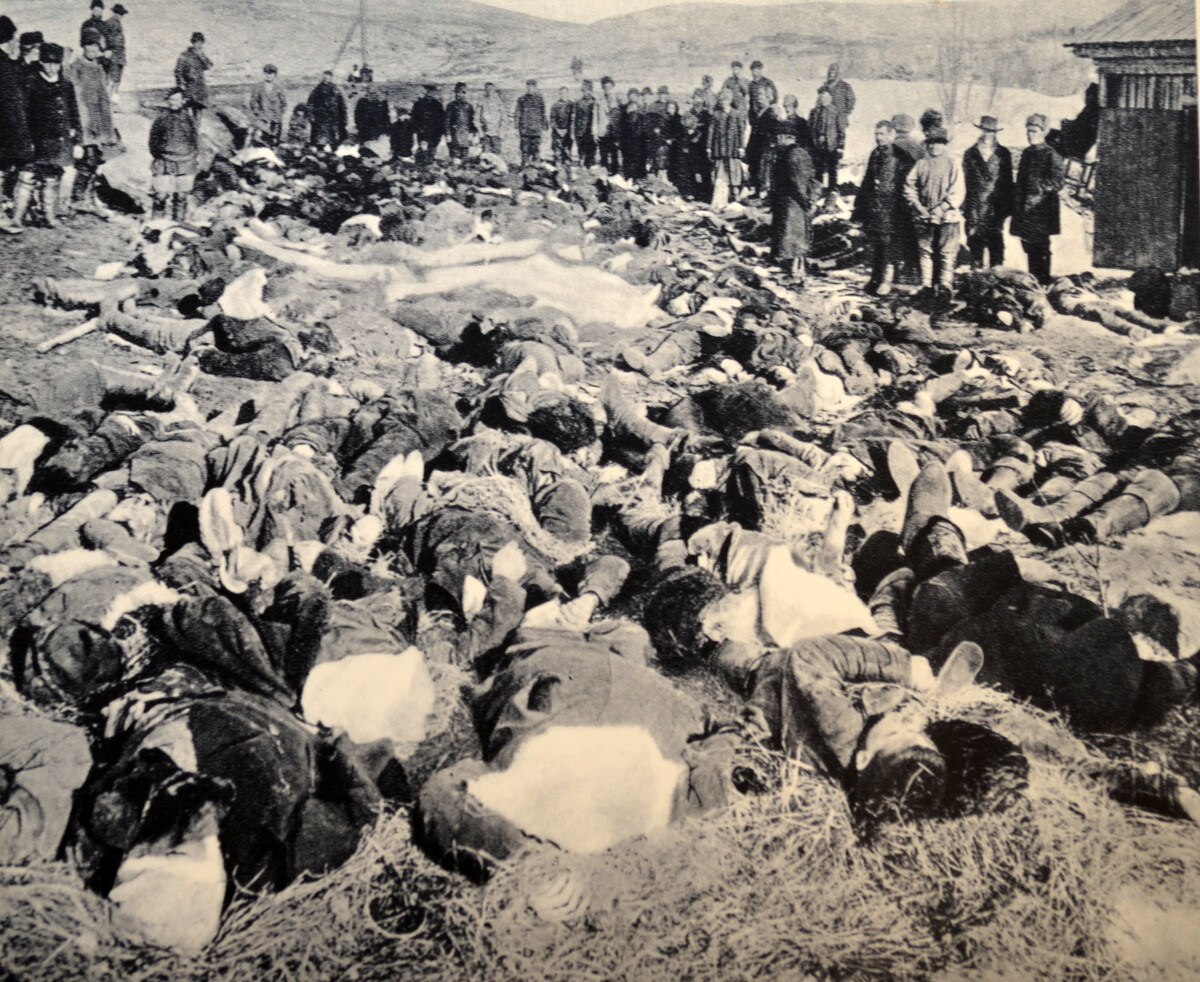
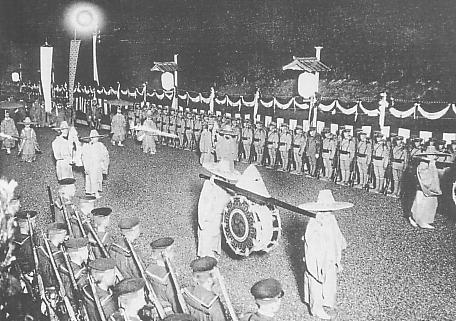
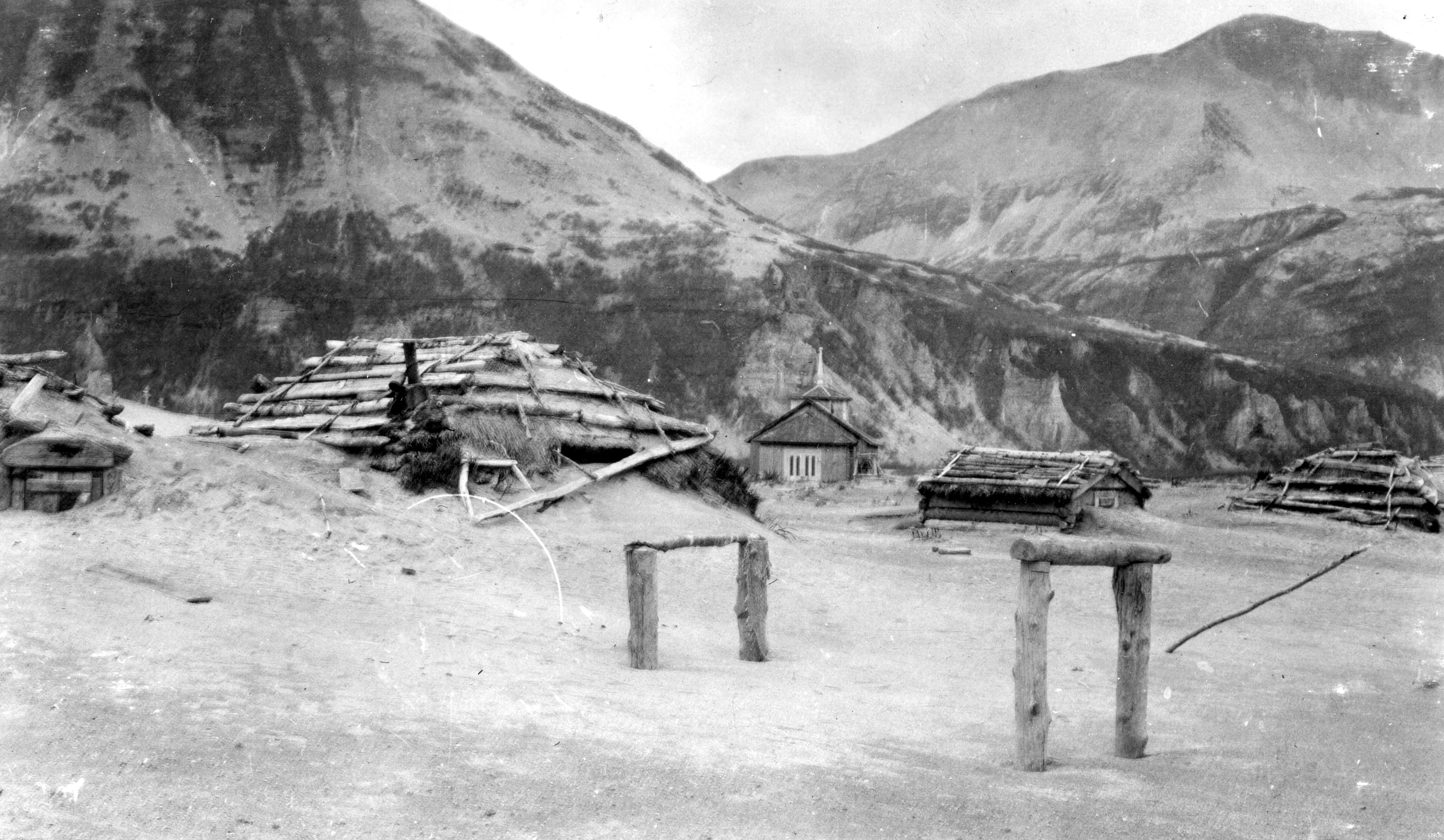
From top to bottom, left to right:
- The Titanic sinks on her maiden voyage, killing over 1,500 people and becoming one of history's deadliest maritime disasters;
- The 1912 Summer Olympics in Stockholm, Sweden introduces electronic timing and public address systems;
- The First Balkan War sees the Balkan League of Bulgaria, Serbia, Greece, and Montenegro push the Ottoman Empire out of Europe;
- The Lena massacre in the Russian Empire kills hundreds of striking gold miners, fueling revolutionary anger;
- The death of Emperor Meiji ends the Meiji era in the Japanese Empire and begins the Taishō period;
- The Novarupta eruption in the U.S. Territory of Alaska becomes the century's most powerful volcanic event.

1912 (MCMXII) was a leap year starting on Monday of the Gregorian calendar and a leap year starting on Sunday of the Julian calendar, the 1912th year of the Common Era (CE) and Anno Domini (AD) designations, the 912th year of the 2nd millennium, the 12th year of the 20th century, and the 3rd year of the 1910s decade. As of the start of 1912, the Gregorian calendar was 13 days ahead of the Julian calendar, which remained in localized use until 1923.

This year is notable for the sinking of the Titanic, which occurred on April 15 and the outbreak of the First Balkan War in October.

In Albania, this leap year runs with only 353 days as the country achieved switching from the Julian to Gregorian Calendar by skipping 13 days. Friday, 30 November (Julian Calendar) immediately turned Saturday, 14 December 1912 (in the Gregorian Calendar).

== Events ==
=== January ===
- January 1 – The Republic of China is established.
- January 5 – The Prague Conference (6th All-Russian Conference of the Russian Social Democratic Labour Party) opens.
- January 6
  - German geophysicist Alfred Wegener first presents his theory of continental drift.
  - New Mexico becomes the 47th U.S. state.
- January 8 – The African National Congress is founded as the South African Native National Congress in Bloemfontein, to promote improved rights for black South Africans, with John Langalibalele Dube as its first president.
- January 12 – In the 1912 German federal election the Social Democrats for the first time becomes the party with the most seats.
- January 14 – Raymond Poincaré forms a coalition government in France, beginning his first term of office as Prime Minister on 21 January.
- January 17 – British polar explorer Captain Robert Falcon Scott and a team of four become the second expeditionary group to reach the South Pole.
- January 18 (Old Style January 5) – Prague Conference: Vladimir Lenin and the Bolshevik Party break away from the rest of the Russian Social Democratic Labour Party.
- January 22 – The Overseas Railroad officially opens on the Florida Keys.
- January 23 – The First International Opium Convention is signed at The Hague to restrict exports.

=== February ===
- February 12 – The Manchu Qing dynasty of China comes to an end after 268 years with the abdication of the Xuantong Emperor Puyi and the establishment of the Republic of China.
- February 14 – Arizona is admitted as the 48th state of the United States, the last contiguous state to be admitted into the Union.
- February 24 – Battle of Beirut: Italy makes a surprise attack on the Ottoman port of Beirut, when the cruiser Giuseppe Garibaldi and the gunboat Volturno bombard the harbour, killing 97 sailors and civilians.
- February 29 – Serbia and Bulgaria secretly sign a treaty of alliance for a term of eight years, with each pledging to come to the defence of the other during war. The treaty would eventually be dishonored in World War I.

=== March ===
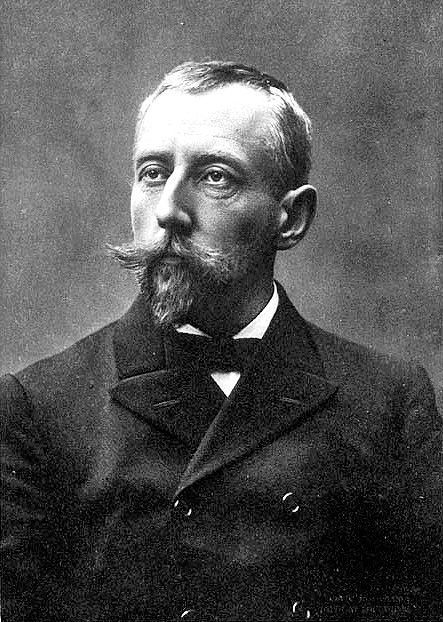
March 7: Amundsen and the South Pole

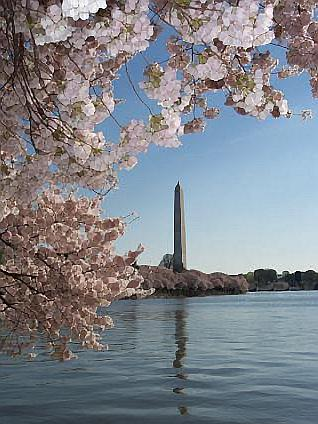
March 27: Cherry trees for Washington, D.C.

- March 1 – Albert Berry is reported to have made the first parachute jump from a flying airplane.
- March 6 – Italian forces become the first to use airships in war as two dirigibles drop bombs on Turkish troops encamped at Janzur, from an altitude of 6,000 feet.
- March 7 – Roald Amundsen, in Hobart, Tasmania, announces his success in reaching the South Pole the previous December.
- March 12 – The Girl Scouts of the USA is founded by Juliette Gordon Low, in Savannah, Georgia.
- March 16 – Lawrence Oates, dying member of Scott's South Pole expedition, leaves the tent saying, "I am just going outside and may be some time."
- March 29 (probable date) – Robert Falcon Scott and the remaining members of his South Pole expedition die.
- March 30 – The French Third Republic establishes the French protectorate in Morocco by the Treaty of Fes with Sultan Abd al-Hafid of Morocco.

=== April ===
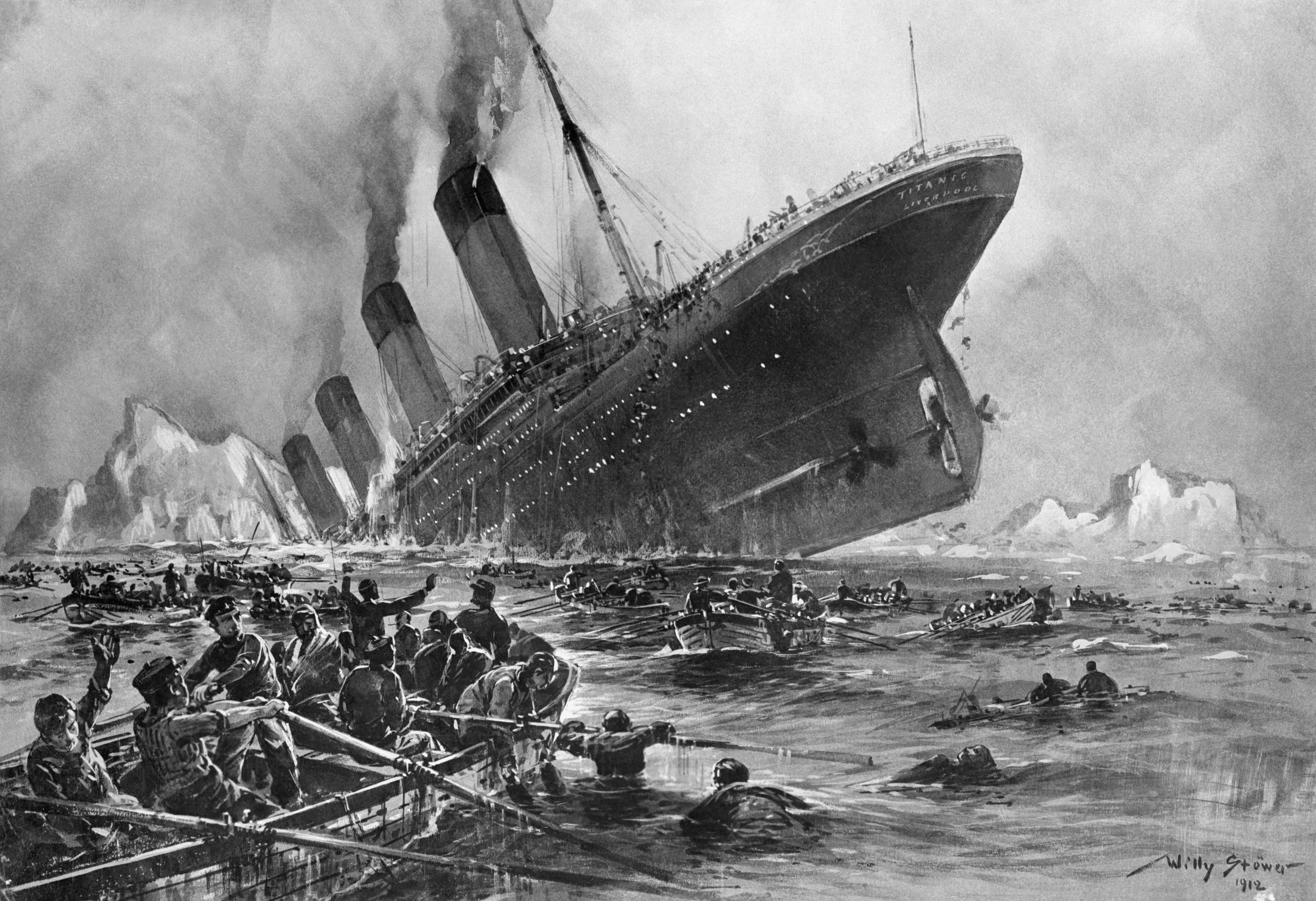
April 15: The RMS Titanic sinks

- April 1 – A partial lunar eclipse takes place, the first of two lunar eclipses this year. It is the 61st lunar eclipse of the 111th Saros cycle, which started with a penumbral lunar eclipse on June 10, 830 AD and will conclude with another penumbral lunar eclipse on July 19, 2092.
- April 10 – White Star liner RMS Titanic departs from Southampton, England, with more than 2,200 passengers and crew on her maiden voyage, bound for New York.
- April 11 – RMS Titanic makes her last call, at Queenstown in Ireland.
- April 14–15 – Sinking of the RMS Titanic: RMS Titanic strikes an iceberg in the northern Atlantic Ocean and sinks with the loss of more than 1,500 lives.
- April 14 – Santos FC, a Brazilian association football club, is founded in State of Sao Paulo.
- April 16 – Harriet Quimby becomes the first woman to fly across the English Channel.
- April 17
  - Lena massacre: Russian troops kill or wound 500 striking gold miners in Siberia.
  - A hybrid solar eclipse is the 30th solar eclipse of Solar Saros 137.
- April 18 – Cunard Line vessel RMS Carpathia arrives in New York with the 705 RMS Titanic survivors.
- April 20 – Fenway Park in Boston, Massachusetts opens.
- April 30 – Carl Laemmle founds Universal Studios as the Universal Film and Manufacturing Company in the United States.

=== May ===
1912 Summer Olympics

- May 5 – The 1912 Summer Olympics open in Stockholm, Sweden. Modern Pentathlon is contested for the first time in these games.
- May 11 – Alaska becomes a territory of the United States.
- May 13 – In the United Kingdom, the Royal Flying Corps (forerunner of the Royal Air Force) is established.
- May 23 – The Hamburg America Line's SS Imperator is launched in Hamburg and is the world's largest ship.
- May 30 – Pioneer aviator Wilbur Wright (of the Wright brothers) dies of typhoid fever in Dayton, Ohio.

=== June ===
- June 6 – The Novarupta volcano is formed in Alaska by a VEI 6 eruption, the world's largest (in terms of matter emitted) in the 20th century.
- June 26 – Gustav Mahler's Symphony No. 9 is premiered posthumously by the Vienna Philharmonic Orchestra conducted by Bruno Walter.
- June 30 – Regina Cyclone: Canada's deadliest tornado strikes Regina, Saskatchewan, killing 28 people.

=== July ===
- July 1 – Harriet Quimby, who set the record as the first woman to fly the English Channel two months previously, dies in Squantum, Massachusetts, after her brand-new two-seat Bleriot monoplane crashes, killing both Quimby and her passenger.
- July 12 – The United States release of Sarah Bernhardt's film Les Amours de la reine Élisabeth is influential in the development of the movie feature. Adolph Zukor, who incorporates Paramount Pictures on May 8, 1914, launches his company as the distributor.
- July 30 – Emperor Meiji of Japan dies; he is succeeded by his son Yoshihito, who becomes Emperor Taishō. In the history of Japan, the event marks the end of the Meiji period and the beginning of the Taishō period.

=== August ===
- August 1 – The Jungfrau Railway is inaugurated with the opening of the subterranean Jungfraujoch railway station in the Bernese Oberland of Switzerland, Europe's highest at 3,450 metres (11,320 ft) above sea level.
- August 4 – United States occupation of Nicaragua: U.S. Marines land from the USS Annapolis in Nicaragua, to support the conservative government at its request.
- August 12 – Sultan Abd al-Hafid of Morocco abdicates.
- August 29 – A typhoon strikes China, killing at least 50,000 people.

=== September ===
- September 4 – The government of the Ottoman Empire agrees to the demands put forward in the Albanian Revolt of 1912.
- September 28 – W. C. Handy publishes "The Memphis Blues" in the United States.

=== October ===
- October 8 – The First Balkan War begins: Montenegro declares war against the Ottoman Empire.
- October 14 – John Flammang Schrank attempts to assassinate Theodore Roosevelt in Milwaukee.
- October 16 – Bulgarian pilots Radul Minkov and Prodan Toprakchiev perform the second bombing with an airplane in history, at the railway station of Karaagac near Edirne, against Turkey.
- October 17 – Krupp engineers Benno Strauss and Eduard Maurer patent austenitic stainless steel.
- October 18 – Italy and the Ottoman Empire sign a treaty in Ouchy near Lausanne, ending the Italo-Turkish War.
- October 18–21 – First Balkan War: The Greek navy captures the island of Lemnos for use as a forward base against the Dardanelles.
- October 24 – First Balkan War: Battle of Kumanovo – Serbian forces defeat the Ottoman army in Vardar Macedonia.
- October
  - Edgar Rice Burroughs' character Tarzan first appears in Tarzan of the Apes, in American pulp magazine The All-Story.
  - Sax Rohmer's character Fu Manchu first appears in the first story of The Mystery of Dr. Fu-Manchu in English pulp magazine The Story-Teller.

=== November ===
- November 5 – 1912 United States presidential election: New Jersey Governor Woodrow Wilson beats former president Theodore Roosevelt and incumbent president William Howard Taft.
- November 11 – William Lawrence Bragg presents his derivation of Bragg's law for the angles for coherent and incoherent scattering from a crystal lattice, creating the field of x-ray crystallography, and making possible the eventual imaging of the double helix of DNA.
- November 28 – Albania declares independence from the Ottoman Empire.

=== December ===
- December 3 – Bulgaria, Montenegro, and Serbia (the Balkan League, but not Greece) sign an armistice with the Ottoman Empire at Çatalca, temporarily halting the First Balkan War after 2 months. (The armistice will expire on February 3, 1913, and hostilities will resume.)
- December 18 – Piltdown Man, thought to be the fossilized skull of a hitherto unknown form of early human, is presented to the Geological Society of London (it is revealed to be a hoax in 1953).
- December 24 – Merck files patent applications in Germany for synthesis of the entactogenic drug MDMA (Ecstasy), developed by Anton Köllisch.

=== Date unknown ===
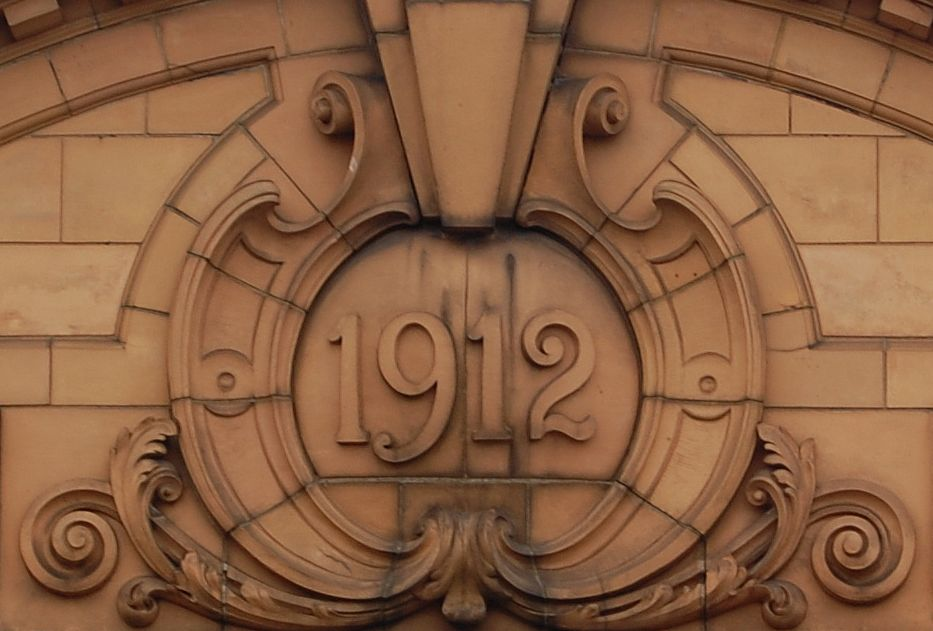
1912 date-mark on the apex of a building at Springfield, Birmingham, England.

- Casimir Funk identifies vitamins.
- The Scoville Unit (used to measure the heat of peppers) is devised and tested by Wilbur Scoville.
- Wilfrid Voynich discovers the eponymous manuscript in the Villa Mondragone.
- Ludwig von Mises publishes his foundational The Theory of Money and Credit.
- Articulated trams are invented and first used by the Boston Elevated Railway.

== Births ==
=== January ===
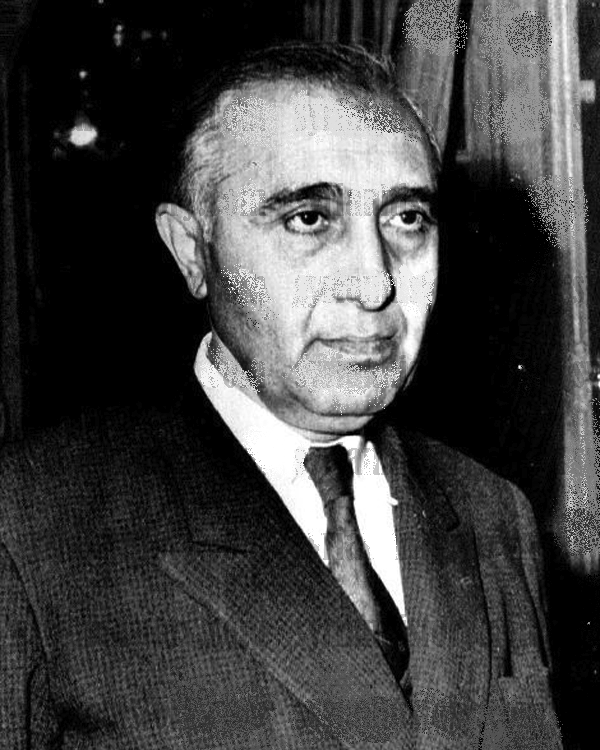
Salah al-Din al-Bitar

José Ferrer

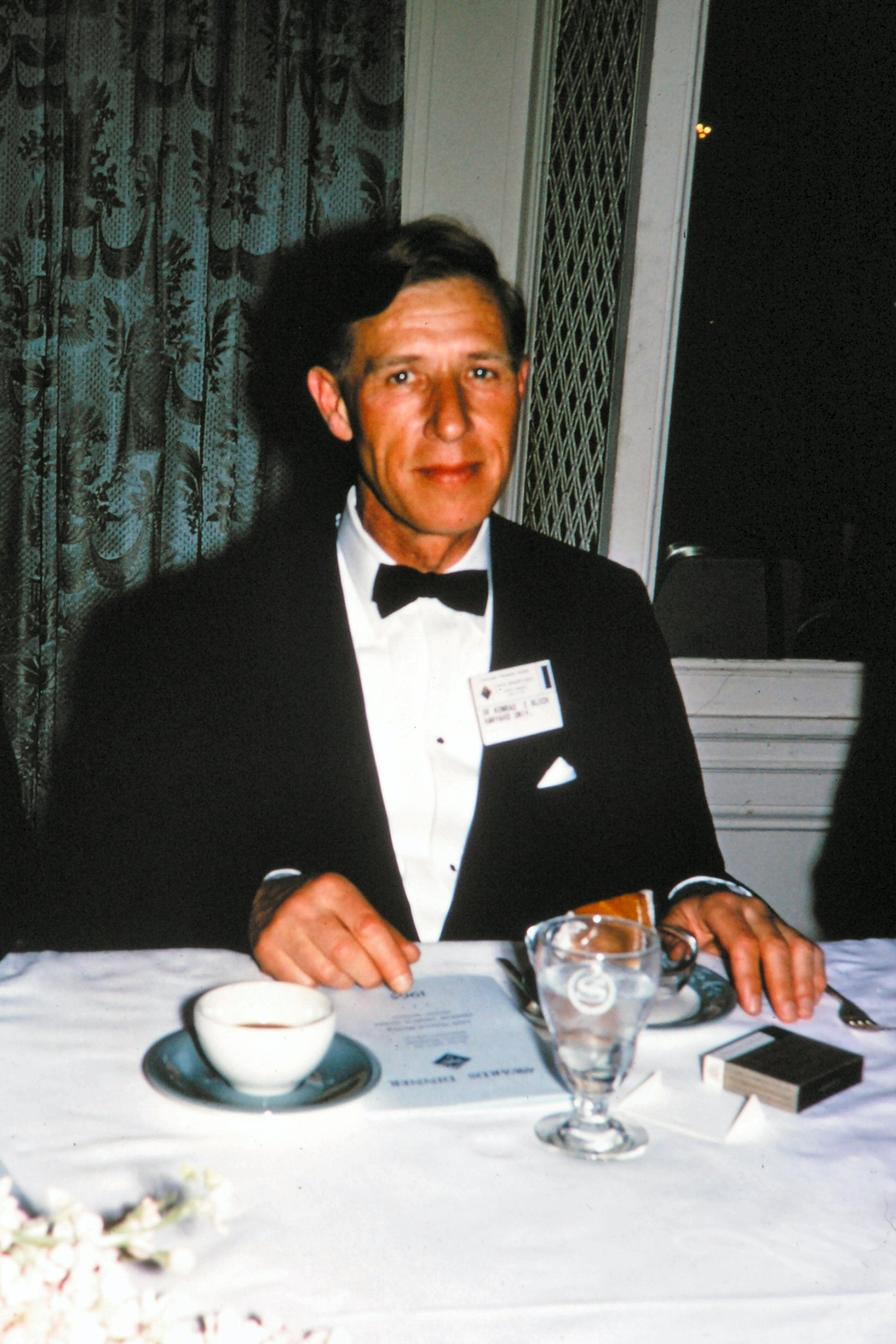
Konrad Emil Bloch

- January 1
  - Kim Philby, British spy (d. 1988)
  - Salah al-Din al-Bitar, Syrian politician, 2-time Prime Minister of Syria (d. 1980)
  - Khertek Anchimaa-Toka, Soviet Tuvan politician, Chairwoman of Tuva (d. 2008)
  - Abdul Salam Sabrah, 3-time Prime Minister of the Yemen Arab Republic (d. 2012)
- January 6
  - Jacques Ellul, French philosopher (d. 1994)
  - Danny Thomas, American actor, comedian (d. 1991)
- January 7
  - Charles Addams, American cartoonist (d. 1988)
  - Ivan Yakubovsky, Marshal of the Soviet Union (d. 1976)
- January 8 – José Ferrer, Puerto Rican actor (d. 1992)
- January 10 – Maria Mandl, Austrian concentration camp guard and war criminal (d. 1948)
- January 11 – Abdul Haq Akorwi, Pakistani Islamic scholar (d. 1988)
- January 15 – Michel Debré, 99th Prime Minister of France (d. 1996)
- January 19 – Leonid Kantorovich, Russian economist, Nobel Prize laureate (d. 1986)
- January 21 – Konrad Emil Bloch, German-born American biochemist, recipient of the Nobel Prize in Physiology or Medicine (d. 2000)
- January 27 – Arne Næss, Norwegian philosopher (d. 2009)
- January 28 – Jackson Pollock, American painter (d. 1956)
- January 30
  - Werner Hartmann, German physicist (d. 1988)
  - Barbara W. Tuchman, American historian (d. 1989)
  - Francis Schaeffer, American Evangelical theologian, philosopher, and Presbyterian pastor (d. 1984)
- January 31 – Camilo Ponce Enríquez, 30th President of Ecuador (d. 1976)

=== February ===
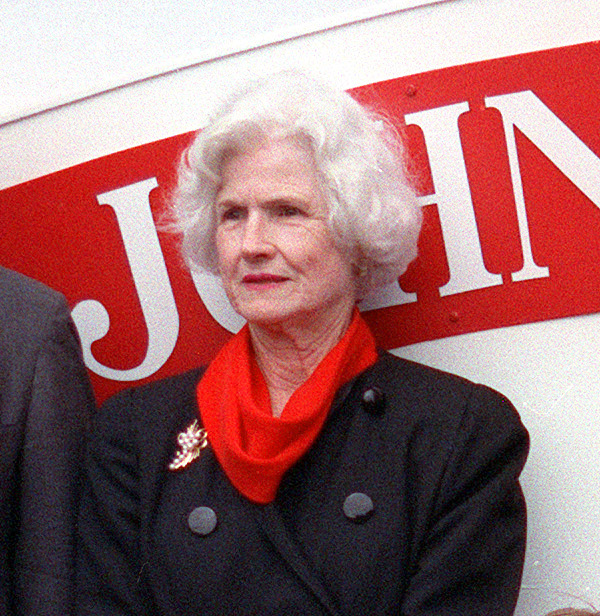
Roberta McCain

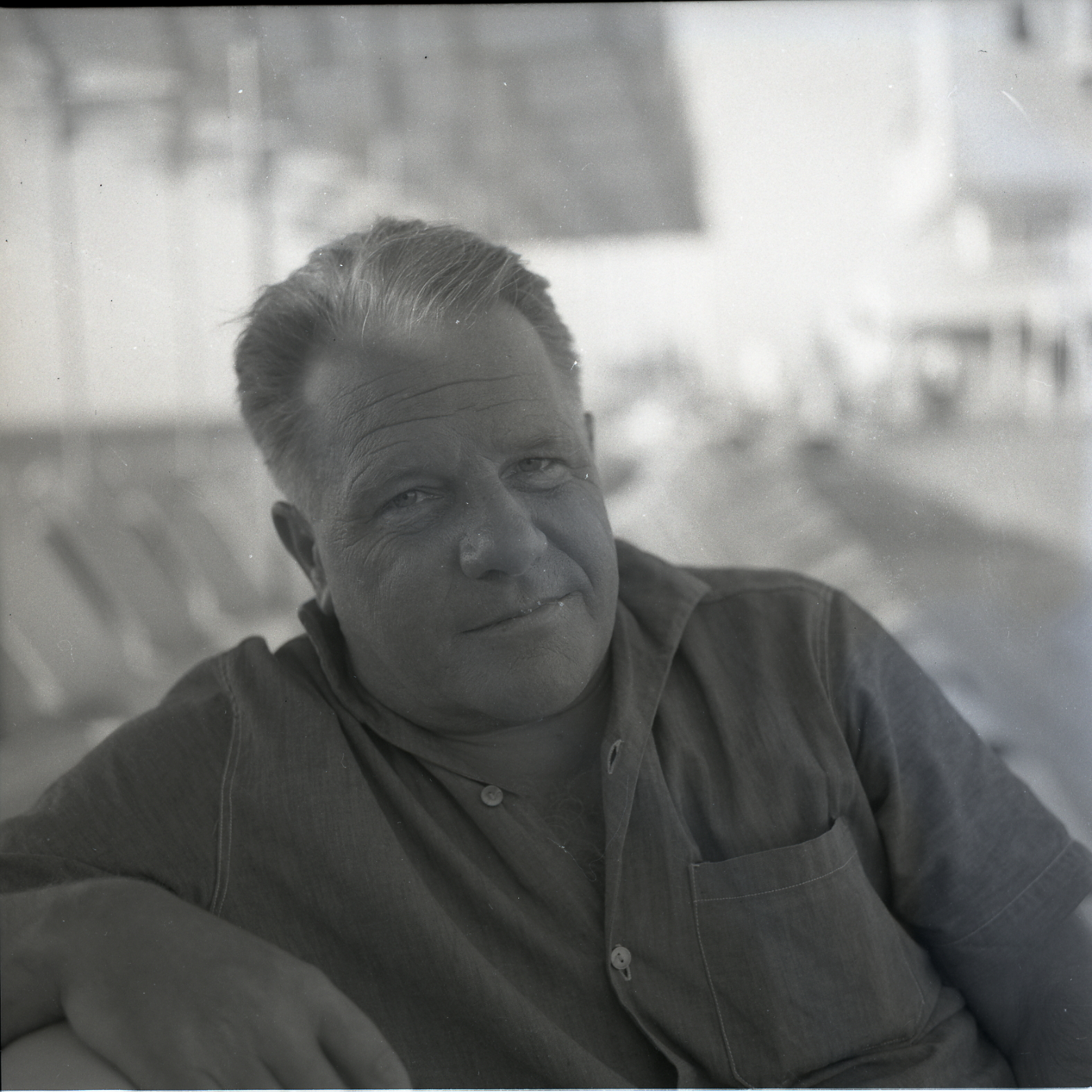
Lawrence Durrell

- February 2 – Millvina Dean, youngest passenger and last survivor of the Sinking of the RMS Titanic (d. 2009)
- February 3 – Lynn Patrick, Canadian ice hockey player, executive (d. 1980)
- February 4
  - Erich Leinsdorf, Austrian conductor (d. 1993)
  - Byron Nelson, American golfer (d. 2006)
- February 6 – Eva Braun, Adolf Hitler's wife (d. 1945)
- February 7 – Roberta McCain, American socialite and oil heiress; mother of U.S. Senator John McCain (d. 2020)
- February 14 – Juan Pujol García, Spanish double agent (d. 1988)
- February 20 – Pierre Boulle, French author (d. 1994)
- February 27 – Lawrence Durrell, British writer (d. 1990)
- February 28 – Prince Bertil, Duke of Halland, Swedish prince (d. 1997)
- February 29 – Kamil Tolon, Turkish industrialist and inventor (d. 1978)

=== March ===
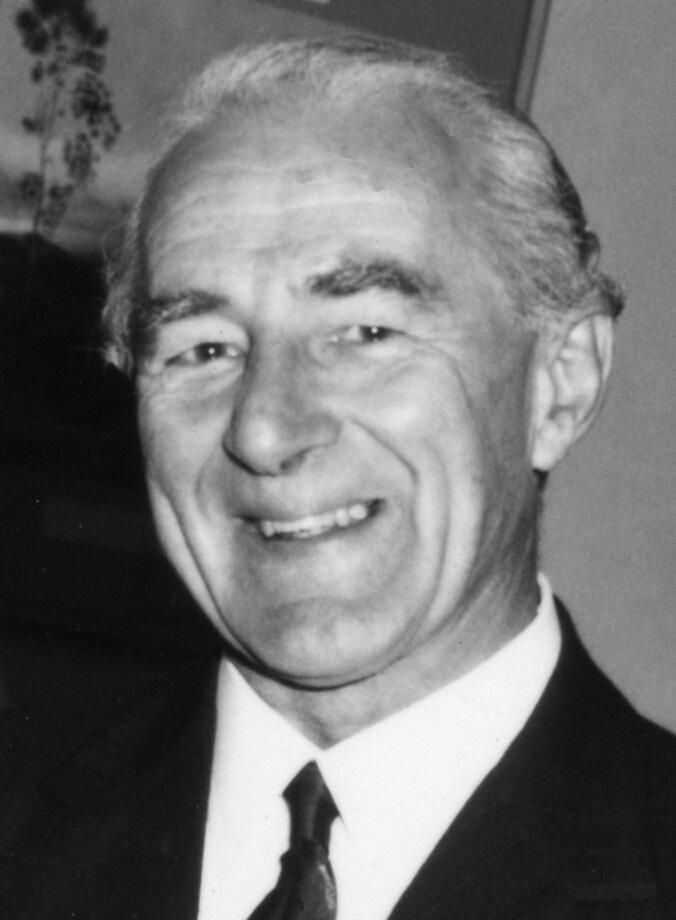
Sir Jack Marshall

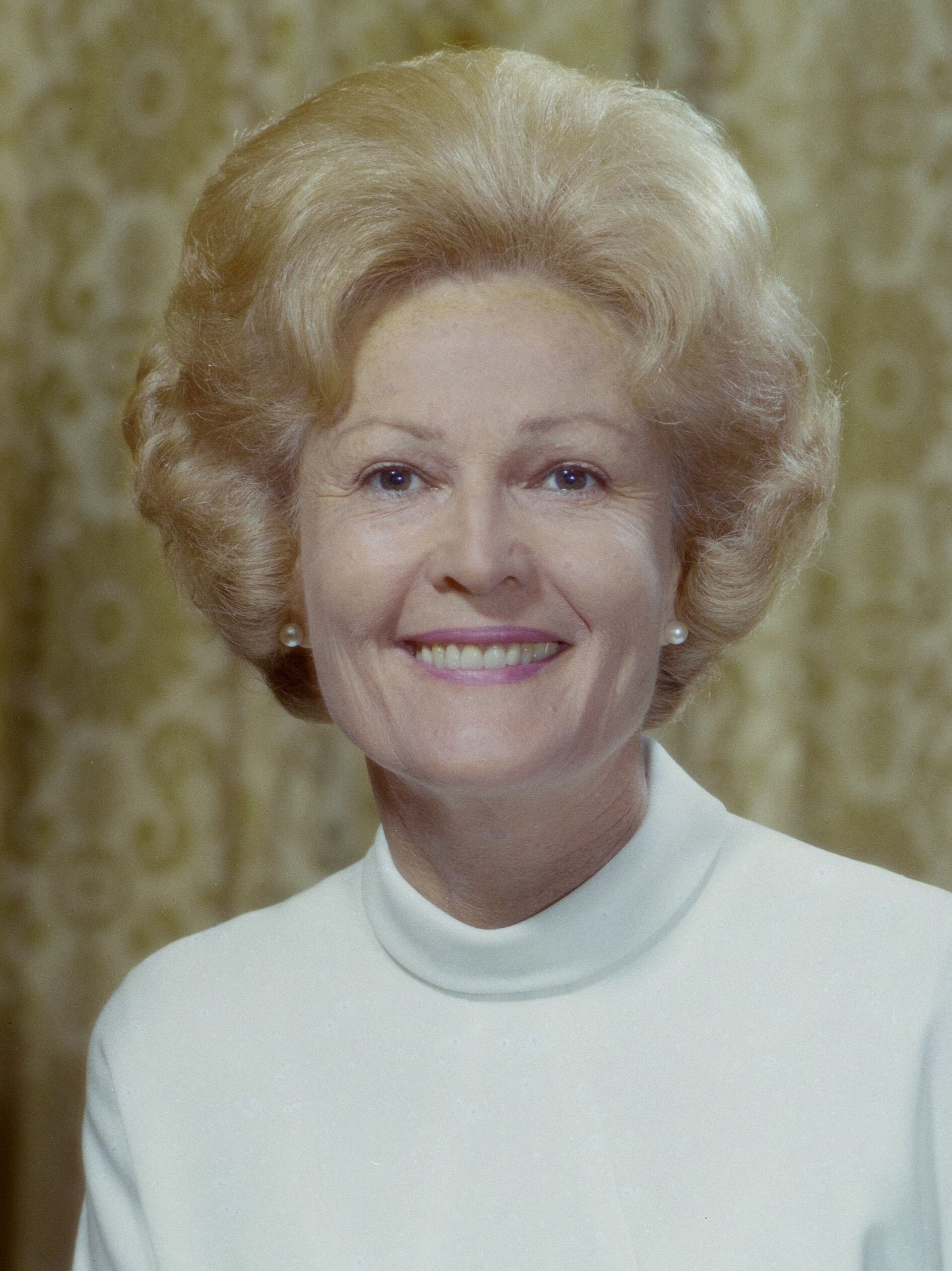
Pat Nixon

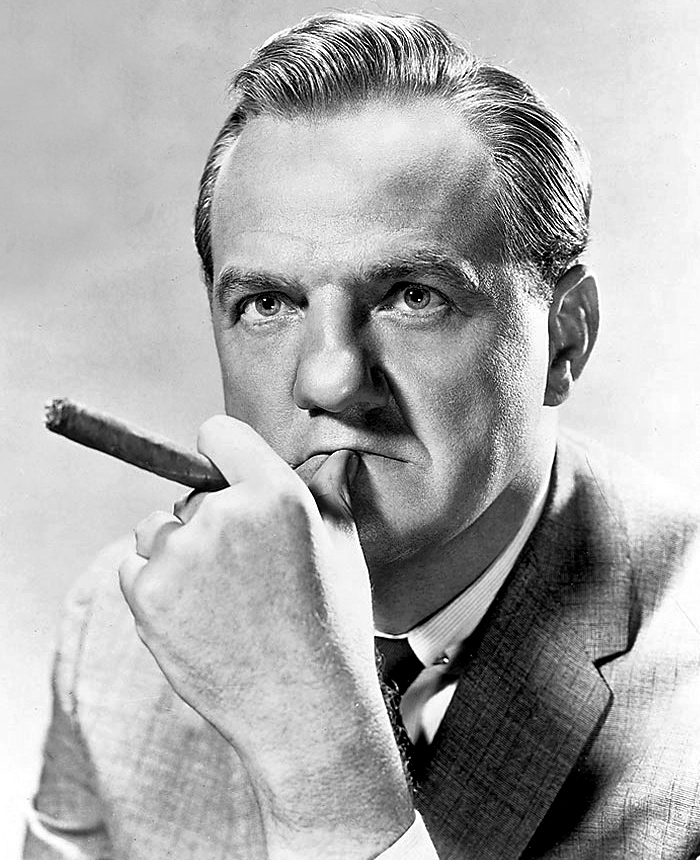
Karl Malden

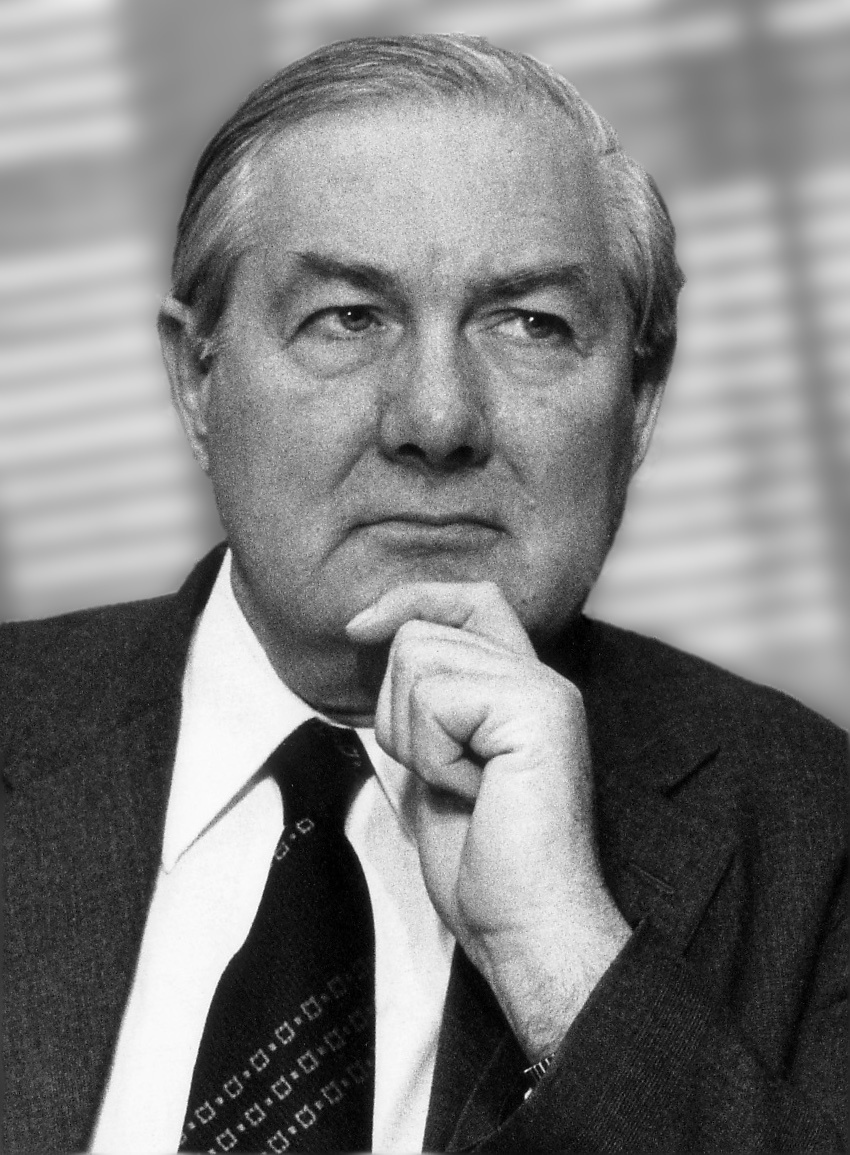
James Callaghan

- March 1 – Boris Chertok, Polish-born Russian rocket designer (d. 2011)
- March 3 – Wally Cassell, Italian-born American actor (d. 2015)
- March 4
  - Afro Basaldella, Italian painter (d. 1976)
  - Carl Marzani, American documentarian and spy (d. 1994)
- March 5
  - David Astor, British newspaper publisher (d. 2001)
  - Jack Marshall, 28th Prime Minister of New Zealand (d. 1988)
  - Marie-Antoinette Tonnelat, French theoretical physicist (d. 1980)
- March 9 – Francis Hovell-Thurlow-Cumming-Bruce, 8th Baron Thurlow, British peer and diplomat (d. 2013)
- March 12 – Irving Layton, Canadian poet (d. 2006)
- March 15 – Lightnin' Hopkins, American musician (d. 1982)
- March 16 – Pat Nixon, First Lady of the United States (d. 1993)
- March 17 – Bayard Rustin, African-American civil rights activist (d. 1987)
- March 19
  - Adolf Galland, German general, World War II fighter ace (d. 1996)
  - William Frankland, British immunologist (d. 2020)
- March 22
  - Karl Malden, American actor (d. 2009)
  - Alfred Schwarzmann, German artistic gymnast (d. 2000)
- March 23 – Wernher von Braun, German-born American physicist, engineer (d. 1977)
- March 24 – Dorothy Height, American civil rights activist (d. 2010)
- March 27 – James Callaghan, Prime Minister of the United Kingdom (d. 2005)
- March 29 – Hanna Reitsch, German aviator (d. 1979)

=== April ===
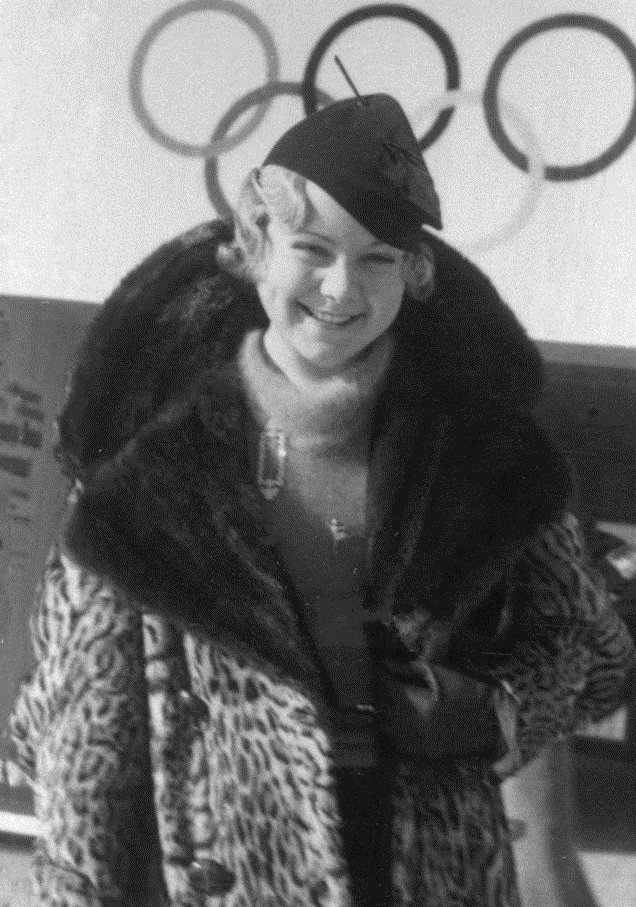
Sonja Henie

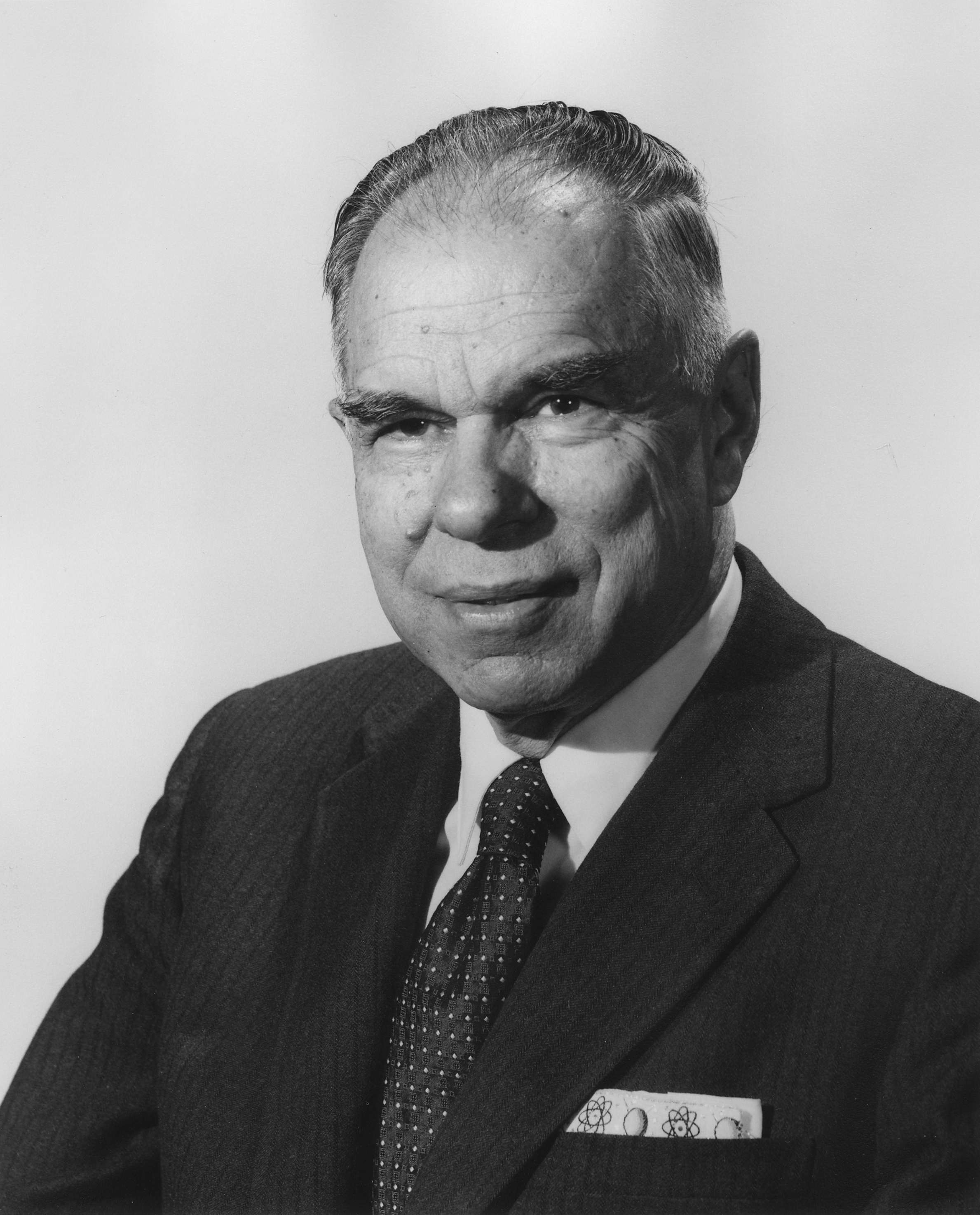
Glenn T. Seaborg

- April 5 – John Le Mesurier, British actor (d. 1983)
- April 8
  - Alois Brunner, Austrian captain (d. 2001 or 2010)
  - Sonja Henie, Norwegian figure skater (d. 1969)
- April 10
  - Roy Hofheinz, American businessman, politician and creator of the Houston Astrodome (d. 1982)
  - Boris Kidrič, 1st Prime Minister of Slovenia (d. 1953)
- April 12 – Hamengkubuwono IX, 9th Sultan of Yogyakarta and 2nd Vice President of Indonesia (d. 1988)
- April 14 – Robert Doisneau, French photographer (d. 1994)
- April 15 – Kim Il Sung, President of North Korea (d. 1994)
- April 16 – David Langton, British actor (d. 1994)
- April 17 – Marta Eggerth, Hungarian-born American actress, singer (d. 2013)
- April 19 – Glenn T. Seaborg, American chemist, Nobel Prize laureate (d. 1999)
- April 22
  - Kathleen Ferrier, British contralto (d. 1953)
  - Kaneto Shindō, Japanese film director (d. 2012)
- April 26 – A. E. van Vogt, Canadian-born American writer (d. 2000)
- April 27 – Zohra Sehgal, Indian stage, film actress (d. 2014)
- April 28 – Odette Hallowes, French World War II heroine (d. 1995)

=== May ===
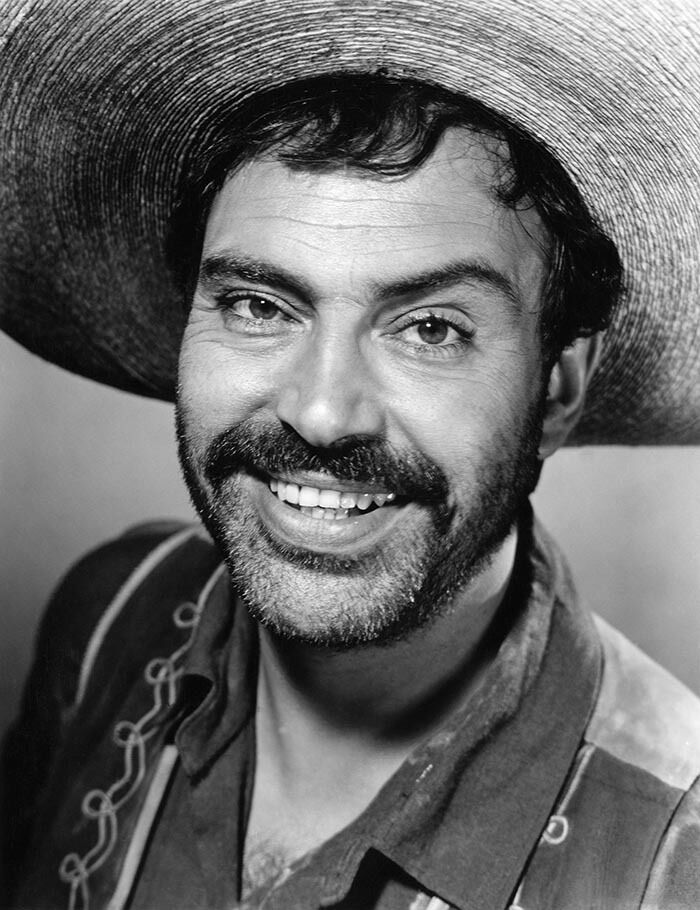
Pedro Armendáriz

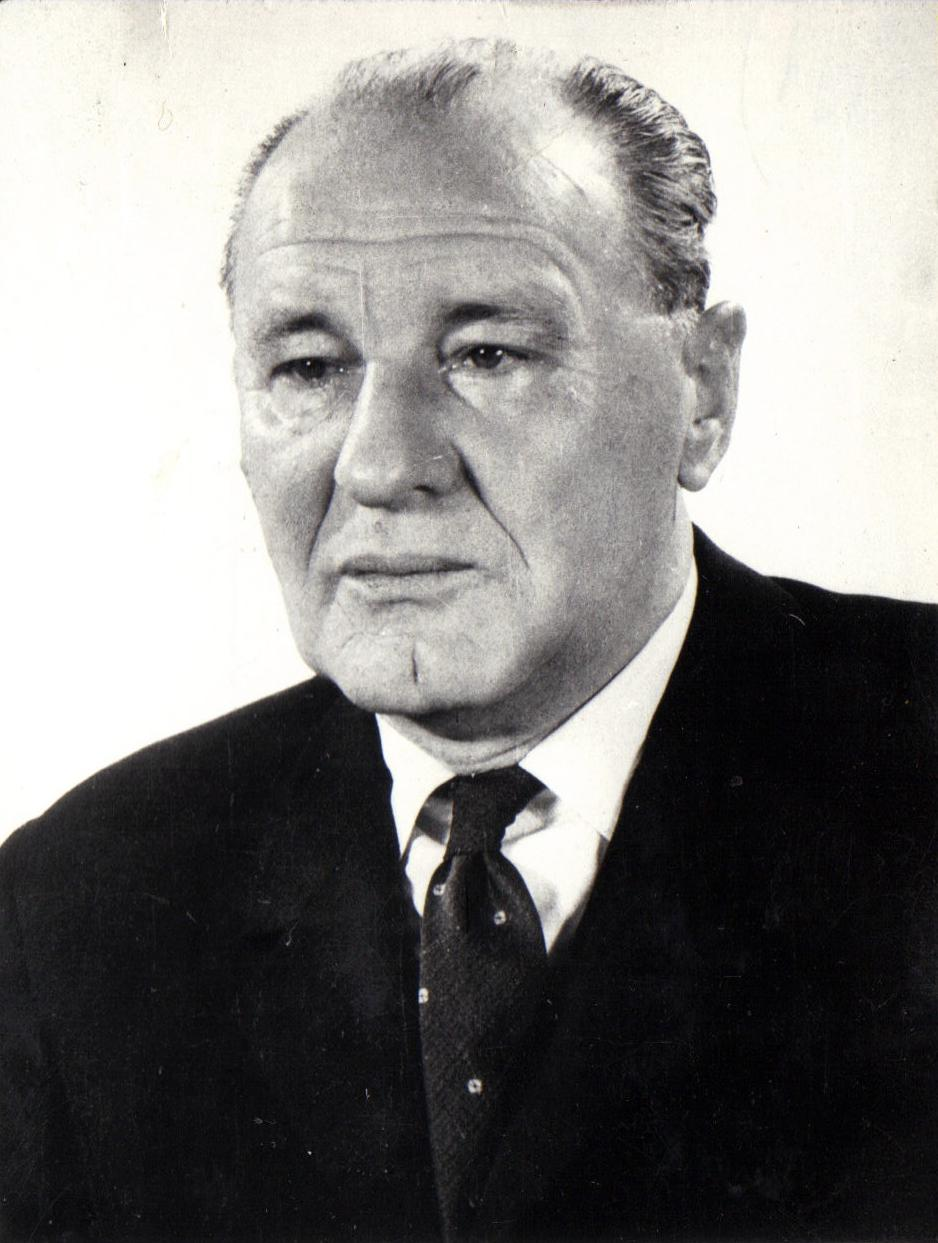
János Kádár

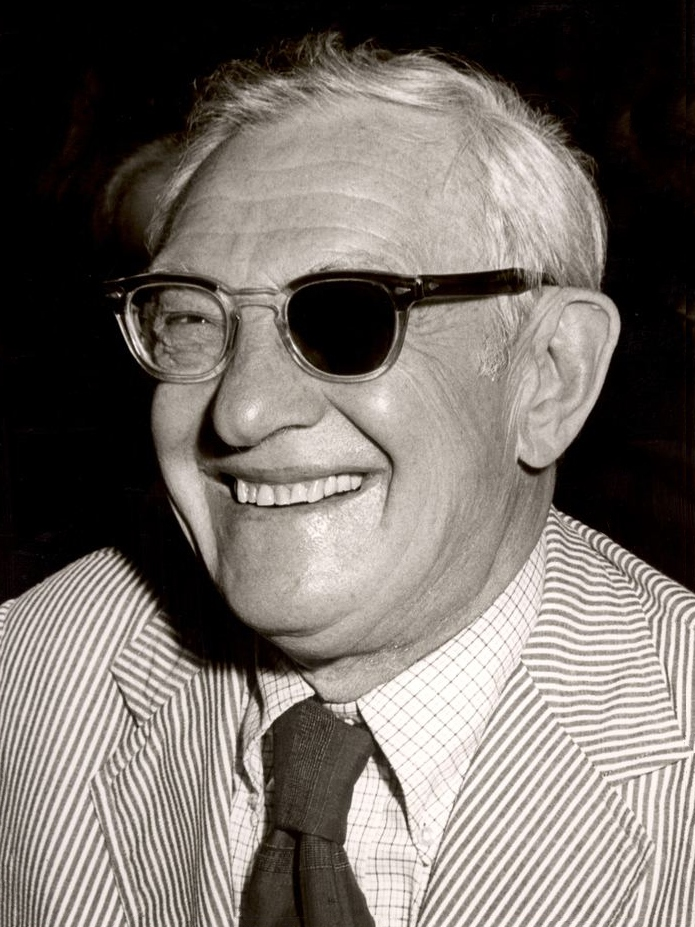
Julius Axelrod

- May 1
  - Winthrop Rockefeller, American politician and philanthropist (d. 1973)
  - Otto Kretschmer, German submarine commander, Bundesmarine admiral (d. 1998)
- May 2
  - Axel Springer, German journalist, founder and owner of Axel Springer AG (d. 1985)
  - Marten Toonder, Dutch comic creator (d. 2005)
- May 3
  - Virgil Fox, American organist (d. 1980)
  - John Bryan Ward-Perkins, British archaeologist (d. 1981)
- May 8
  - Dagny Carlsson, Swedish blogger (d. 2022)
  - Ptolemy Reid, 2nd Prime Minister of Guyana (d. 2003)
- May 9 – Pedro Armendáriz, Mexican actor (d. 1963)
- May 16 – Studs Terkel, American writer, broadcaster (d. 2008)
- May 17 – Archibald Cox, American Watergate special prosecutor (d. 2004)
- May 18
  - Perry Como, American singer (d. 2001)
  - Walter Sisulu, South African anti-apartheid activist (d. 2003)
- May 20 – Wilfrid Sellars, American philosopher (d. 1989)
- May 22 – Herbert C. Brown, English-born American chemist, Nobel Prize laureate (d. 2004)
- May 23
  - Jean Françaix, French composer (d. 1997)
  - John Payne, American actor (d. 1989)
- May 25 – Princess Deokhye of Korea (d. 1989)
- May 26
  - János Kádár, Hungarian Communist politician (d. 1989)
  - Jay Silverheels, Canadian-born native American actor (The Lone Ranger) (d. 1980)
- May 27
  - John Cheever, American novelist, short story writer (d. 1982)
  - Sam Snead, American golfer (d. 2002)
- May 28
  - Herman Johannes, Indonesian professor, scientist and politician (d. 1992)
  - Patrick White, Australian writer, Nobel Prize laureate (d. 1990)
- May 29 – Pamela Hansford Johnson, English poet, novelist, playwright, literary and social critic (d. 1981)
- May 30 – Julius Axelrod, American biochemist, recipient of the Nobel Prize in Physiology or Medicine (d. 2004)
- May 31
  - Alfred Deller, English countertenor (d. 1979)
  - Henry M. Jackson, American politician (d. 1983)

=== June ===
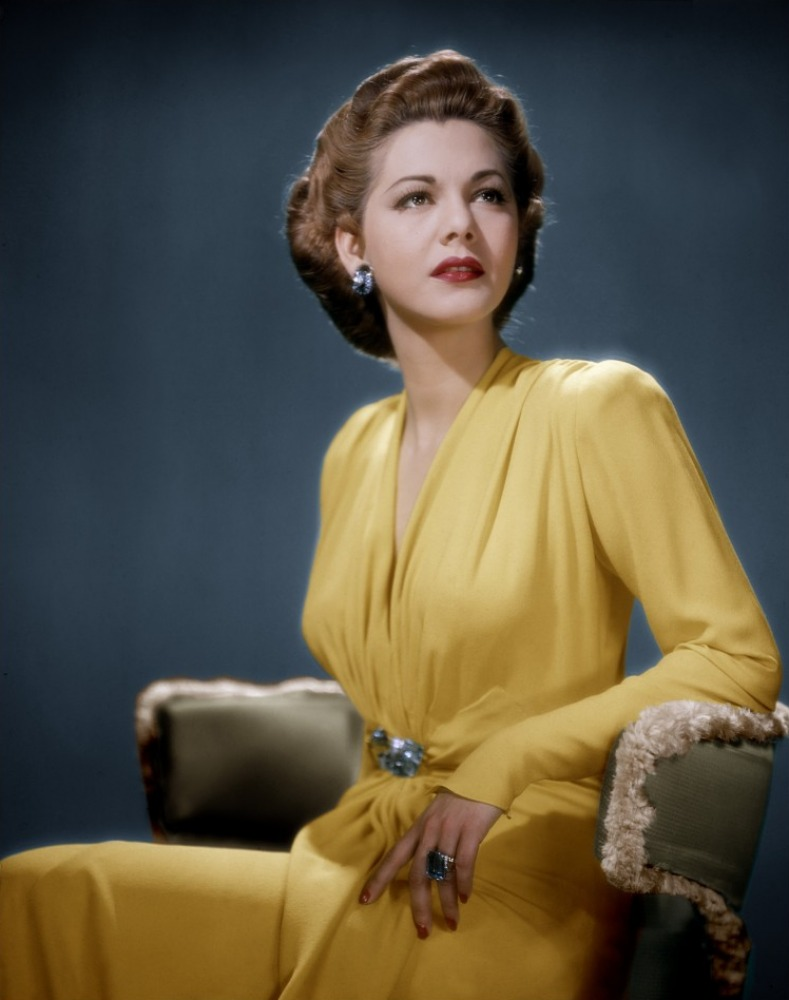
Maria Montez

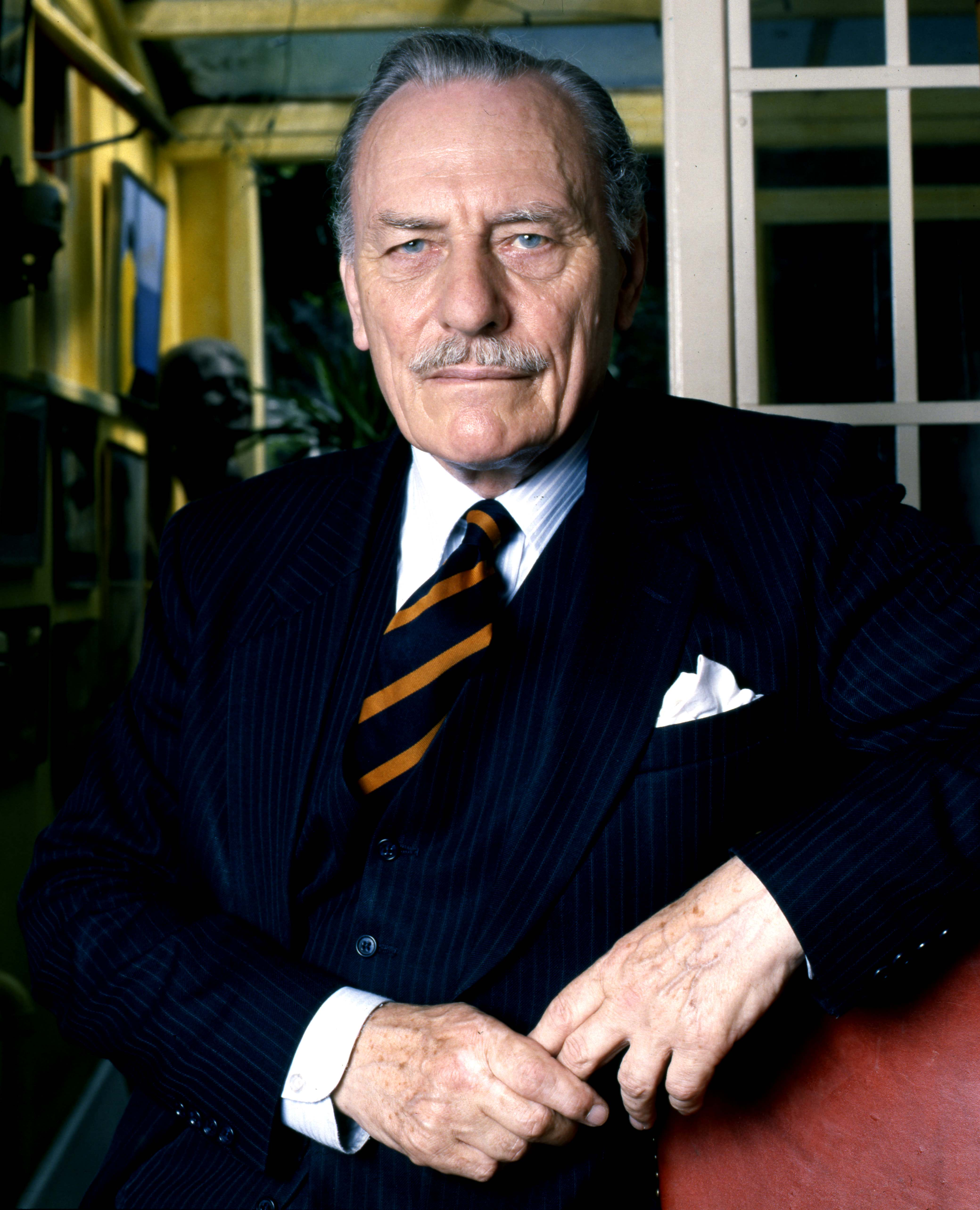
Enoch Powell

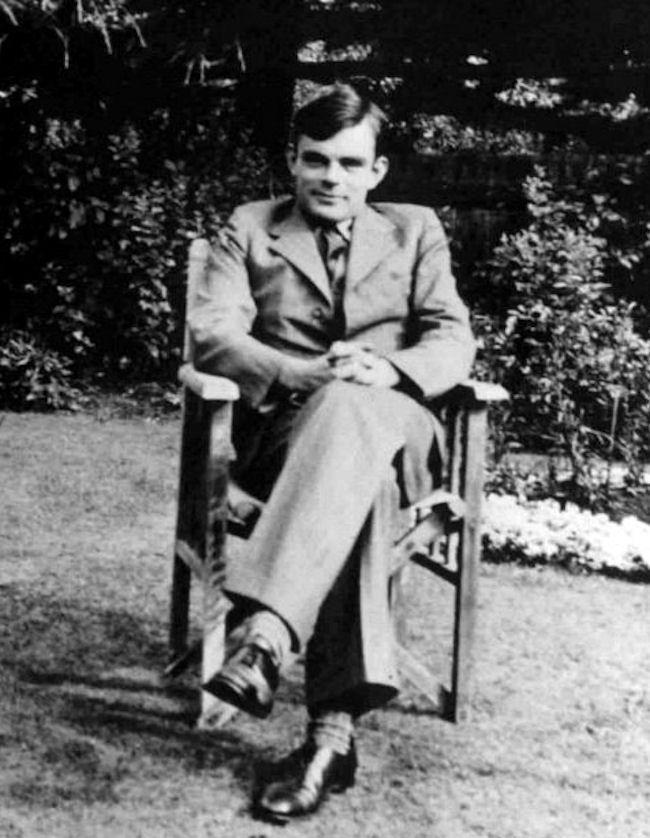
Alan Turing

- June 6 – Maria Montez, Dominican actress (d. 1951)
- June 8 – Harry Holtzman, American artist (d. 1987)
- June 11
  - Phạm Hùng, Vietnamese prime minister (d. 1988)
  - Rashid bin Saeed Al Maktoum, 2nd Prime Minister of the United Arab Emirates (d. 1990)
- June 16 – Enoch Powell, British politician (d. 1998)
- June 21 – Kazimierz Leski, Polish engineer, fighter pilot, intelligence and counter-intelligence officer (d. 2000)
- June 23
  - Samson Kisekka, Ugandan politician (d. 1999)
  - Alan Turing, British mathematician (d. 1954)
- June 24 – Mary Wesley, English novelist (d. 2002)
- June 27 – E. R. Braithwaite, Guyanese novelist, writer, teacher, and diplomat (d. 2016)
- June 28 – Glenn Morris, American Olympic athlete (d. 1974)
- June 29 – Émile Peynaud, French oenologist, researcher (d. 2004)

=== July ===
- July 1 – David Brower, American environmentalist (d. 2000)
- July 4 – Said Akl, Lebanese poet, philosopher, writer, playwright and language reformer (d. 2014)
- July 6 – Heinrich Harrer, Austrian mountaineer, explorer (d. 2006)
- July 7 – Gérard Lecointe, French general (d. 2009)
- July 12 – Petar Stambolić, Yugoslav communist politician (d. 2007)
- July 14 – Woody Guthrie, American folk musician (d. 1967)
- July 17 – Art Linkletter, American radio and television host, best known as the host of House Party (d. 2010)
- July 19 – Peter Leo Gerety, American Catholic prelate (d. 2016)
- July 31 – Milton Friedman, American economist, Nobel Prize laureate (d. 2006)

=== August ===
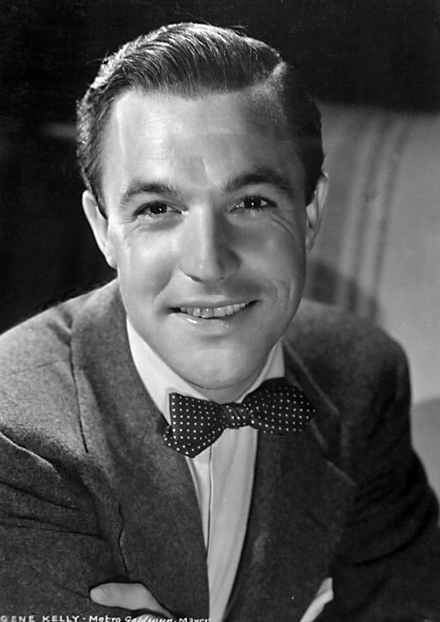
Gene Kelly

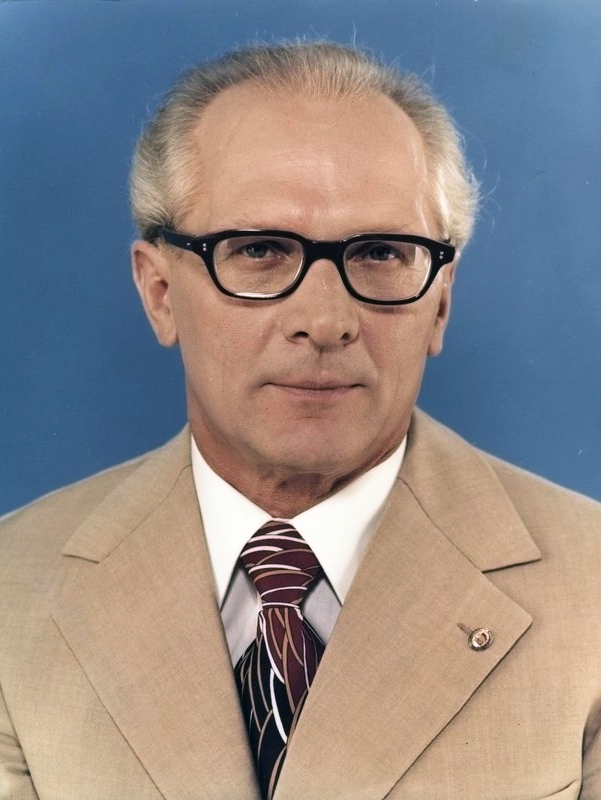
Erich Honecker

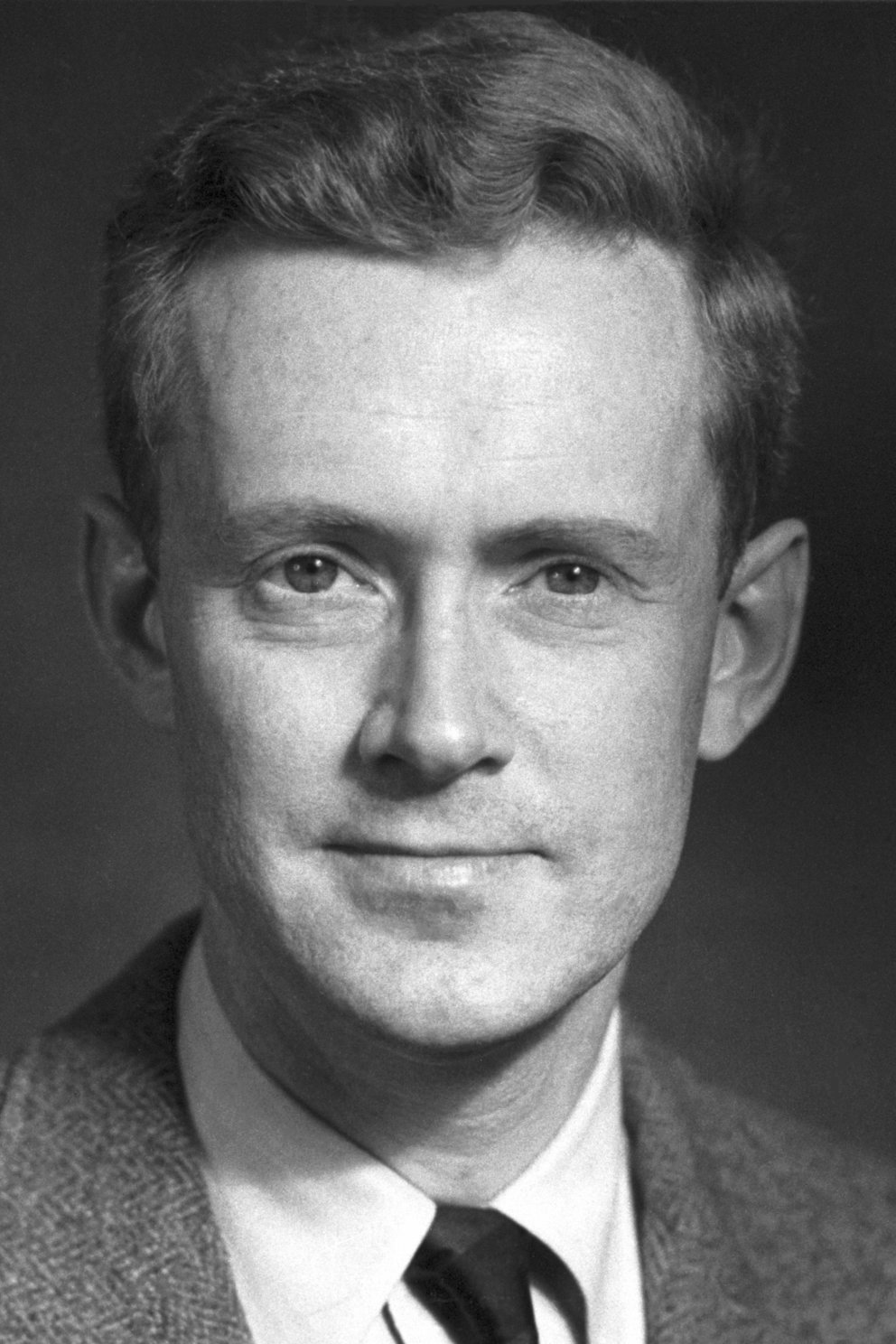
Edward Mills Purcell

- August 4 – Raoul Wallenberg, Swedish humanitarian (d. 1947)
- August 7 – Võ Chí Công, Vietnamese Communist politician (d. 2011)
- August 9 – Anne Brown, American-born Norwegian soprano (d. 2009)
- August 10 – Jorge Amado, Brazilian author (d. 2001)
- August 11 – Norman Levinson, American mathematician (d. 1975)
- August 13
  - Ben Hogan, American golfer (d. 1997)
  - Salvador Luria, Italian-born American biologist, recipient of the Nobel Prize in Physiology or Medicine (d. 1991)
- August 15
  - Julia Child, American television chef (d. 2004)
  - Amir Khan, Indian classical vocal singer (d. 1974)
  - Naoto Tajima, Japanese athlete (d. 1990)
- August 16
  - Ted Drake, English footballer (d. 1995)
  - Wendy Hiller, English actress (d. 2003)
  - Edward J. York, American air force colonel, participant of the Doolittle Raid (d. 1984)
- August 18 – Otto Ernst Remer, German Wehrmacht officer (d. 1997)
- August 23
  - Nelson Rodrigues, Brazilian playwright, journalist and novelist (d. 1980)
  - Gene Kelly, American actor, dancer and film director (d. 1996)
- August 25 – Erich Honecker, East German politician (d. 1994)
- August 26 – John Tinniswood, British supercentenarian (d. 2024)
- August 27
  - Gloria Guinness, Mexican-born English fashion icon (d. 1980)
  - José Laurel Jr., Filipino politician (d. 1998)
- August 29 – Sohn Kee-chung, Japanese athlete (d. 2002)
- August 30
  - Edward Mills Purcell, American physicist, Nobel Prize laureate (d. 1997)
  - Nancy Wake, New Zealand-born World War II heroine (d. 2011)

=== September ===
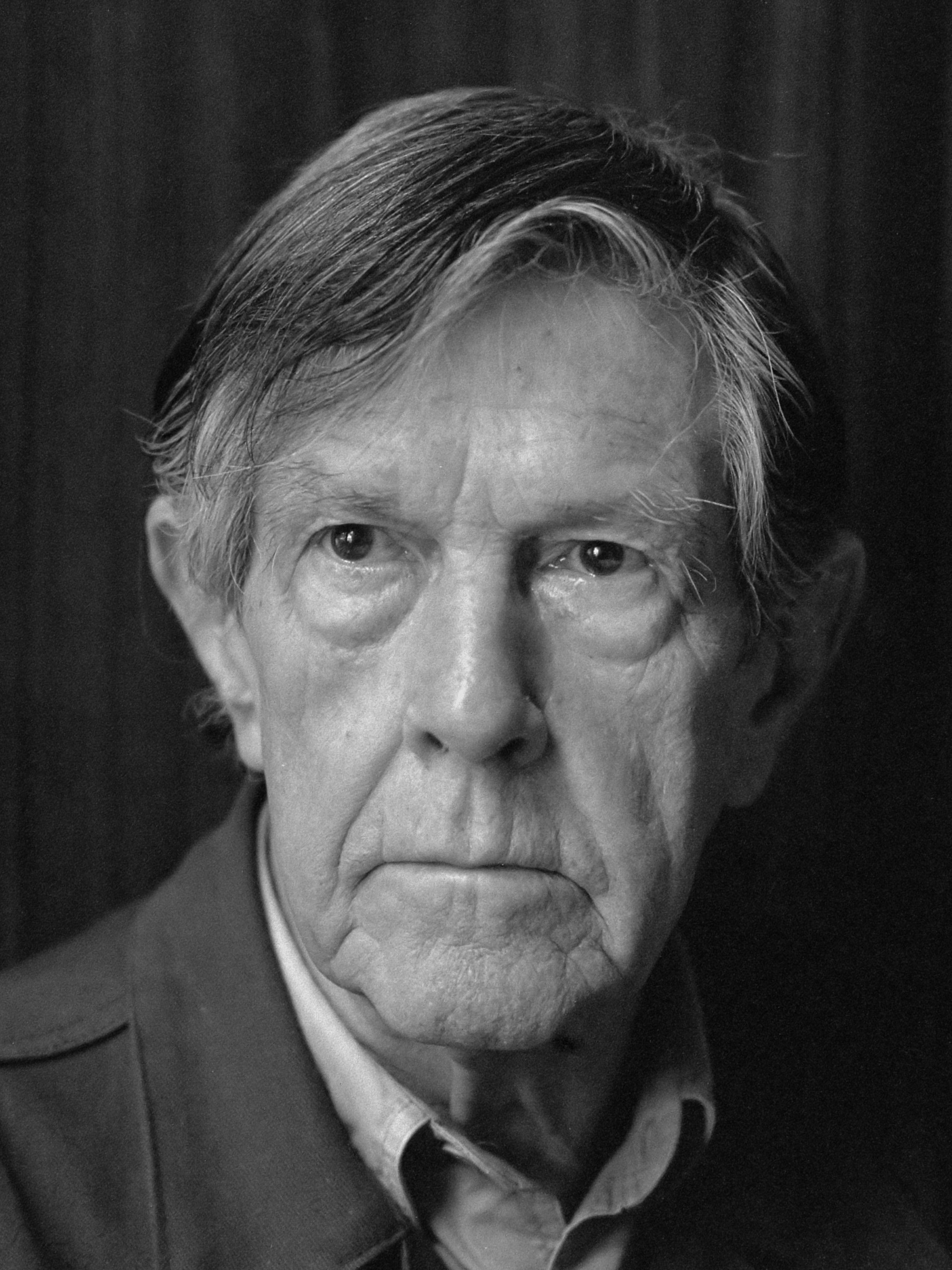
John Cage

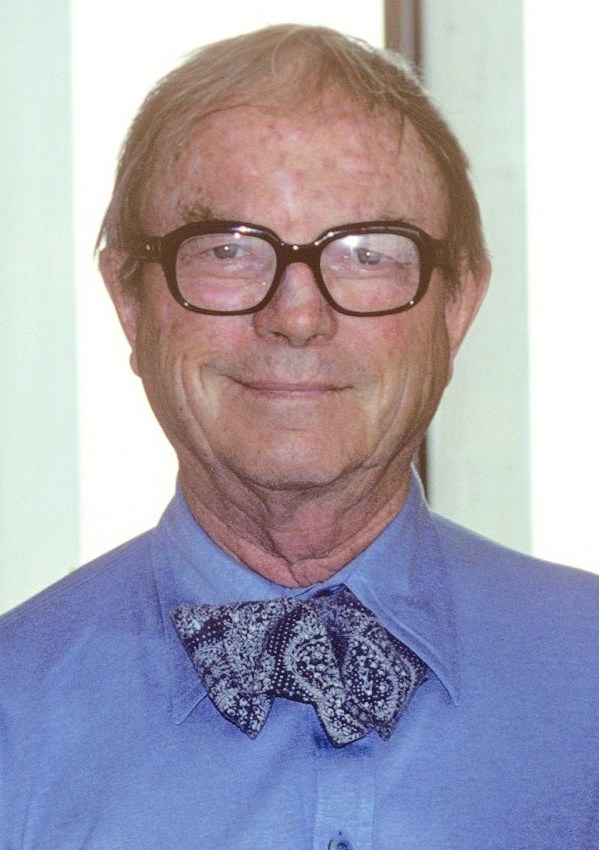
Chuck Jones

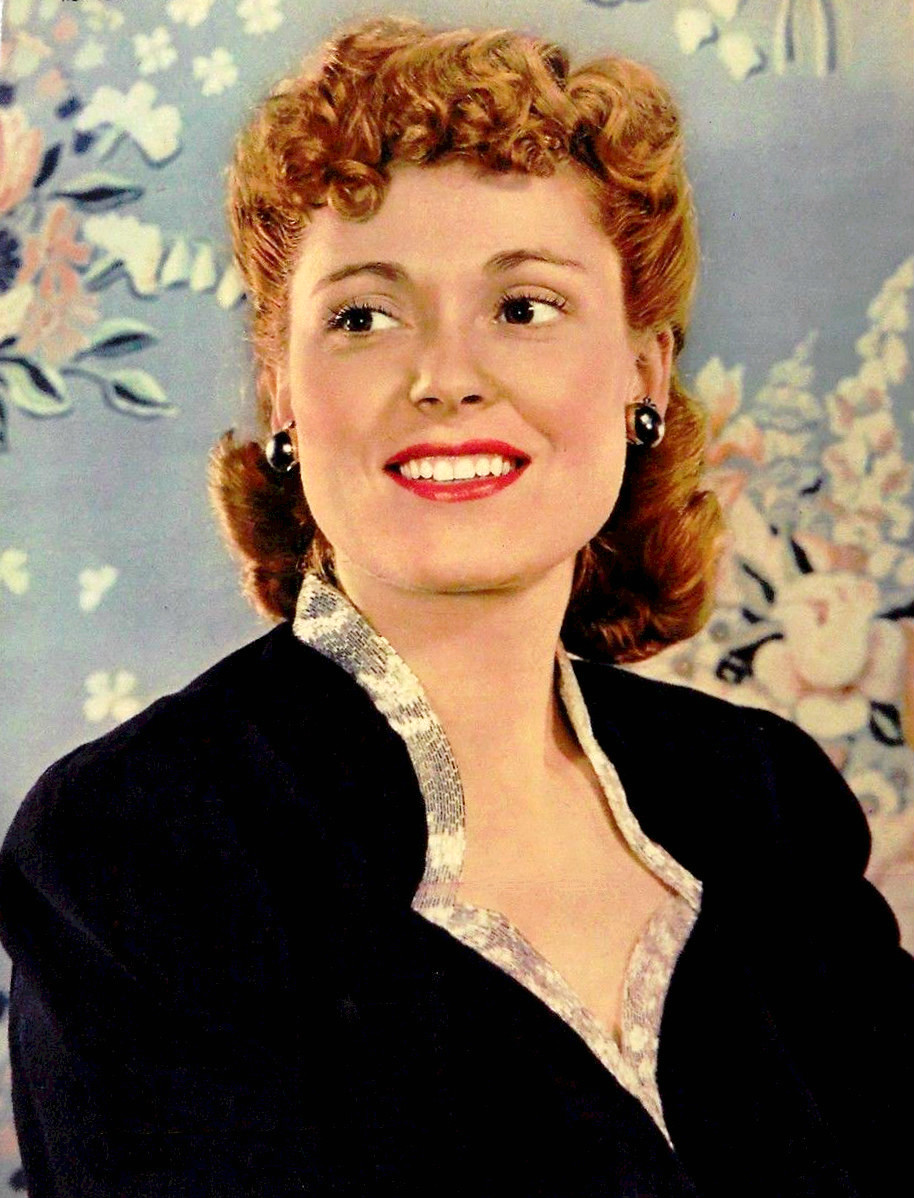
Martha Scott

- September 1 – Gwynfor Evans, Welsh politician (d. 2005)
- September 5
  - John Cage, American composer (d. 1992)
  - Kristina Söderbaum, Swedish-born German actress (d. 2001)
  - Frank Thomas, American animator and pianist (d. 2004)
- September 7 – David Packard, American electrical engineer (d. 1996)
- September 14 – Eduard von Falz-Fein, Russian-born art patron (d. 2018)
- September 15 – Ismail Yassine, Egyptian comedian, actor (d. 1972)
- September 21 – Chuck Jones, American animator (Warner Brothers) (d. 2002)
- September 22 – Martha Scott, American actress (d. 2003)
- September 29 – Michelangelo Antonioni, Italian film director (d. 2007)

=== October ===
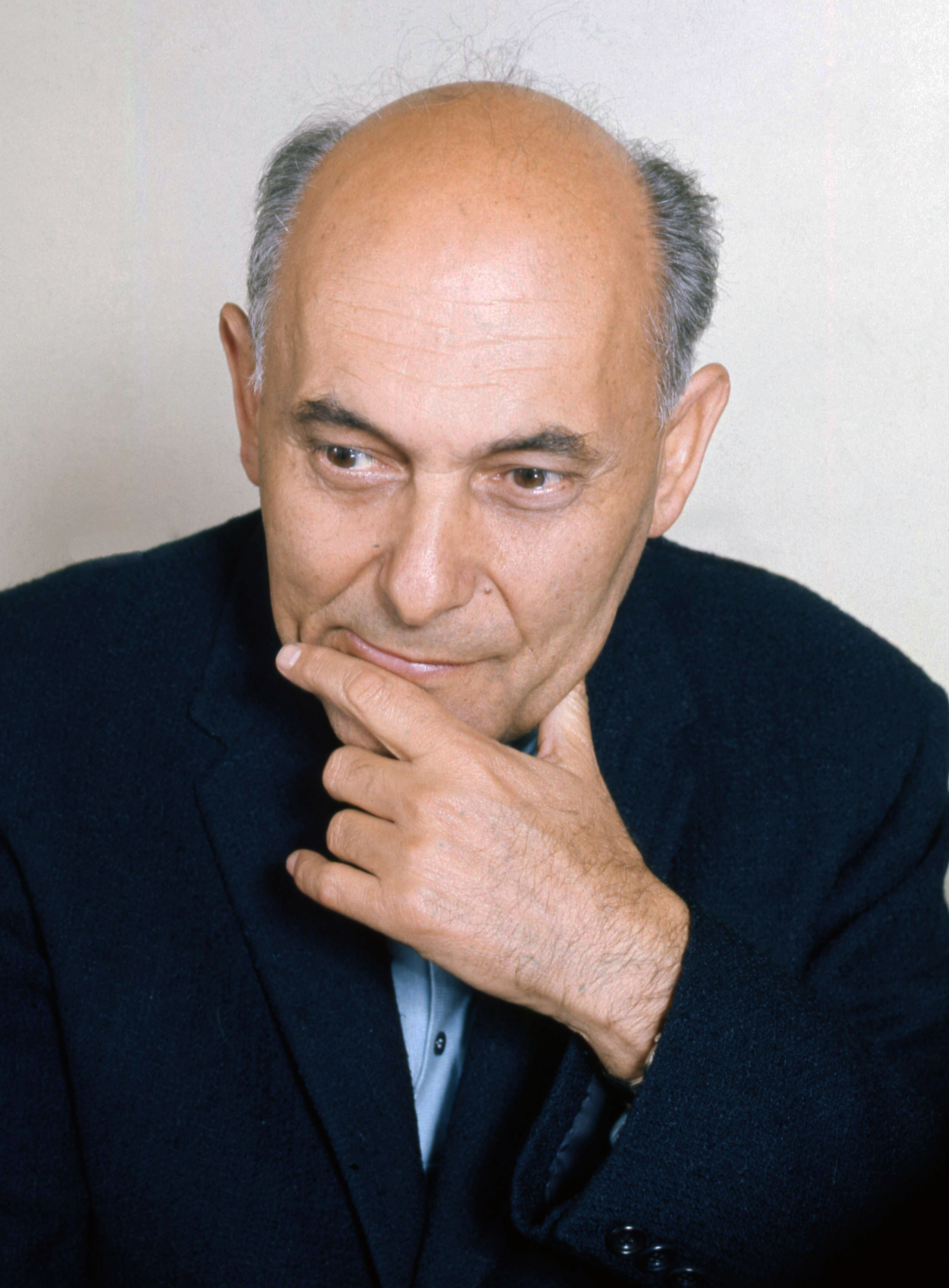
Sir Georg Solti

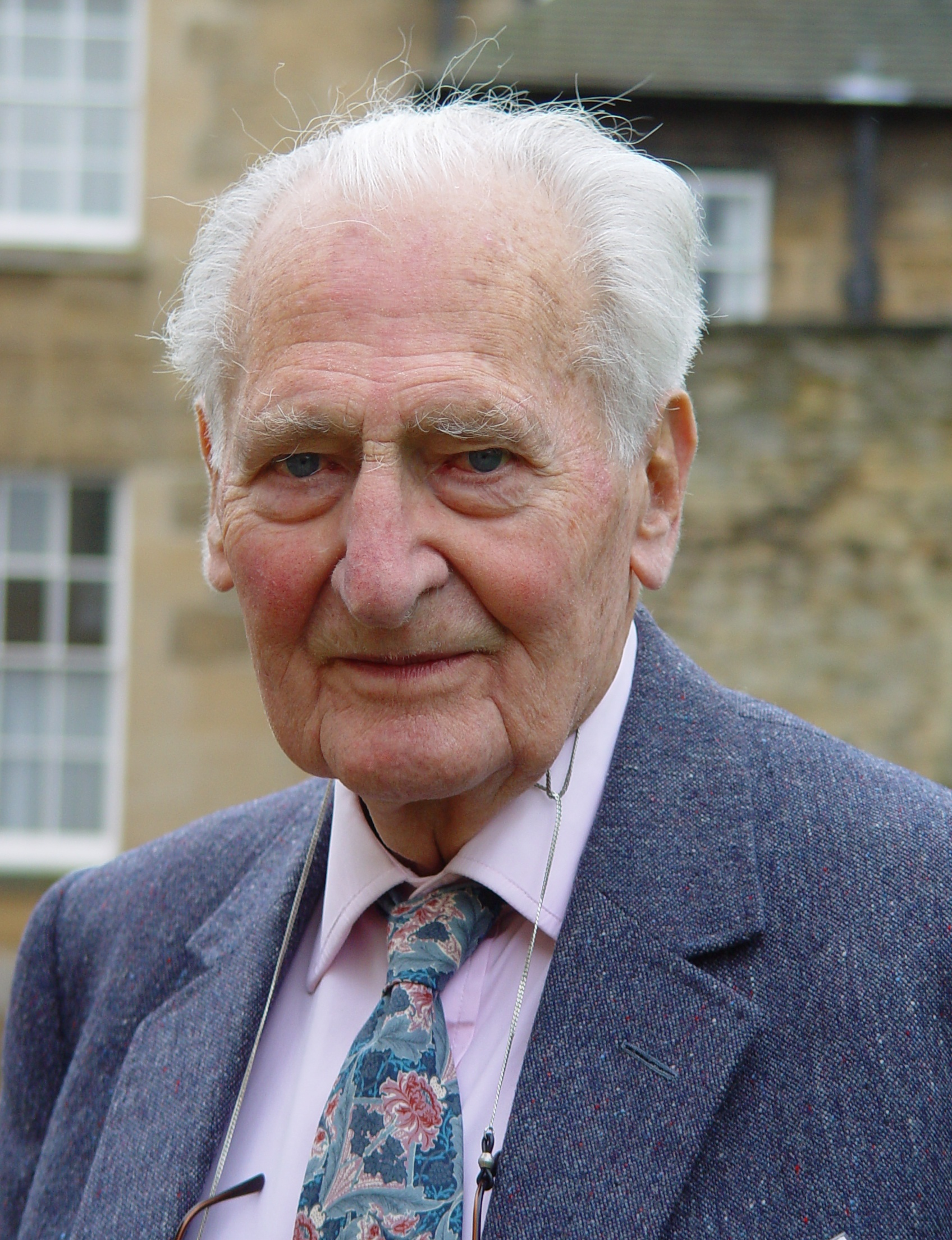
Sir Richard Doll

- October 1 – Kathleen Ollerenshaw, English mathematician (d. 2014)
- October 5 – João Marinho Neto, Brazilian supercentenarian, world's oldest verified living man (since 25 November 2024)
- October 7 – Fernando Belaúnde, 42nd and 43rd President of Peru (d. 2002)
- October 11 – Fedora Alemán, Venezuelan soprano (d. 2018)
- October 12 – Grigory Kravchenko, Soviet test pilot and air force general (d. 1943)
- October 13 – Cornel Wilde, Hungarian-born American actor, film director (d. 1989)
- October 16 – Clifford Hansen, American politician (d. 2009)
- October 17 – Pope John Paul I, Italian churchman (d. 1978)
- October 18 – Philibert Tsiranana, prime minister and 1st president of Madagascar (d. 1978)
- October 21 – Georg Solti, Hungarian conductor (d. 1997)
- October 22
  - Johan Hendrik Weidner, Belgian World War II resistance fighter (d. 1994)
  - George N. Leighton, American judge (d. 2018)
- October 25 – Minnie Pearl, American humorist (d. 1996)
- October 27 – Conlon Nancarrow, American-born Mexican composer (d. 1997)
- October 28 – Richard Doll, English physiologist, epidemiologist (d. 2005)
- October 31 – Ollie Johnston, American animator (d. 2008)

=== November ===
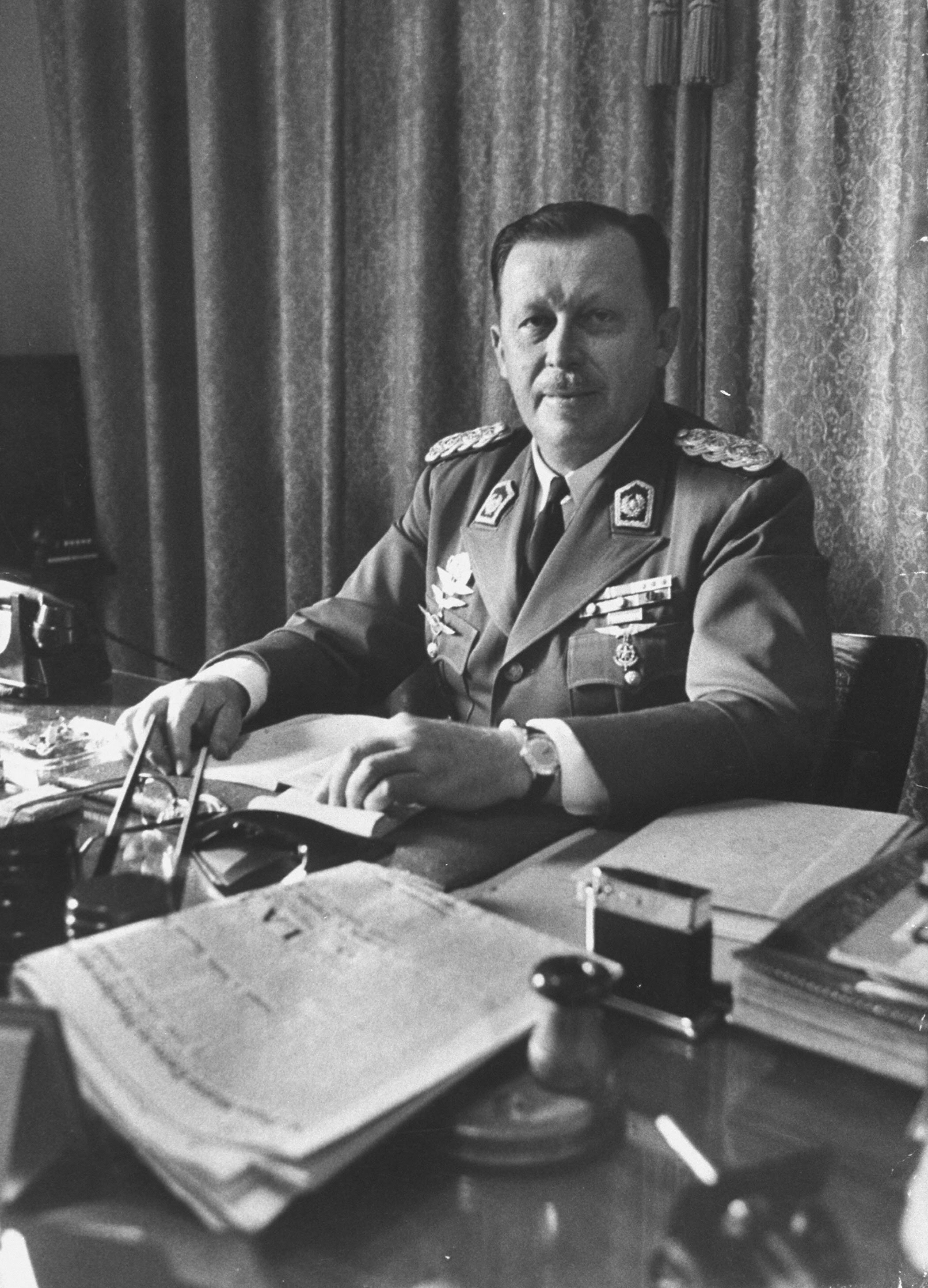
Alfredo Stroessner

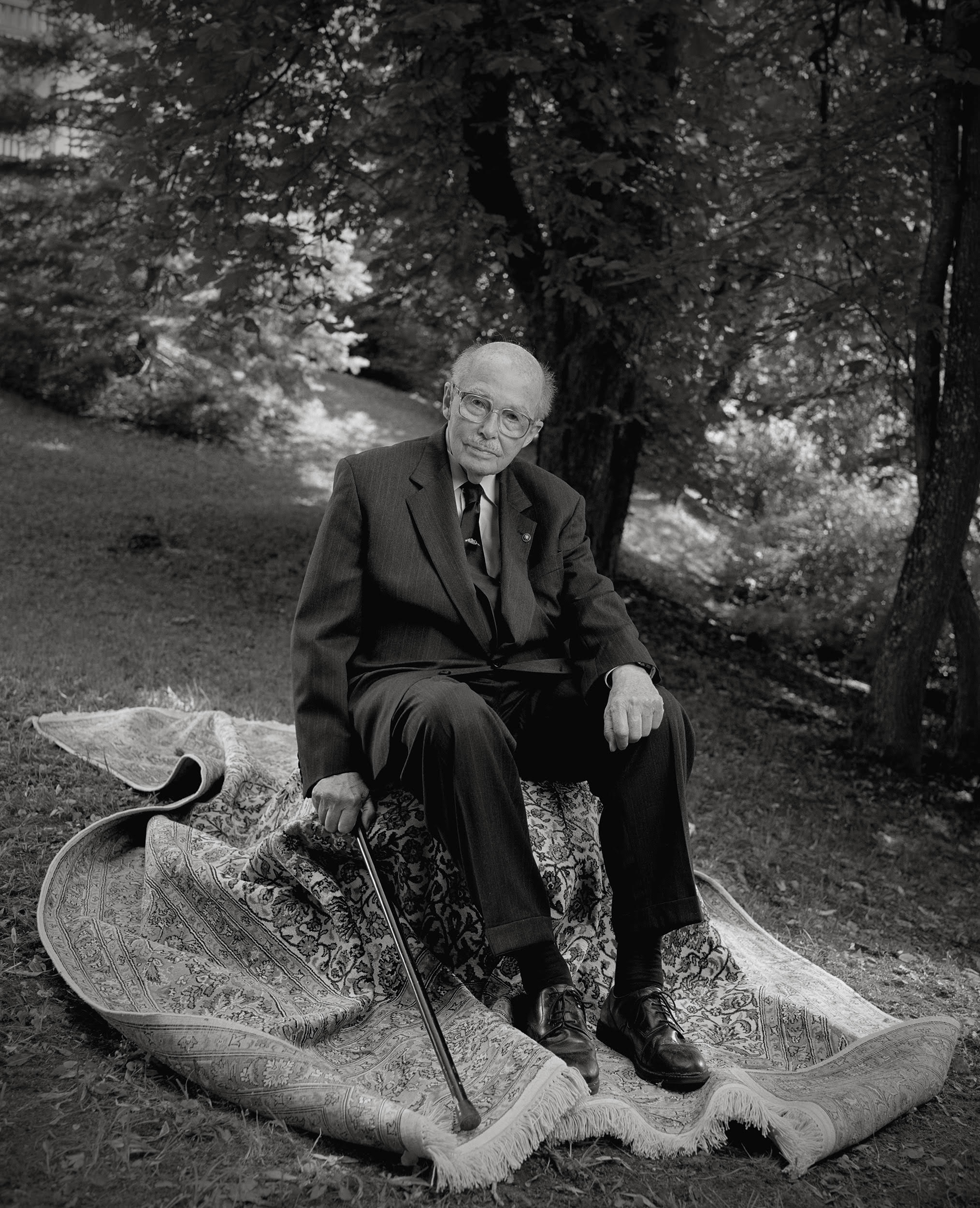
Otto von Habsburg

- November 3 – Alfredo Stroessner, President of Paraguay (d. 2006)
- November 6 – George Cakobau, 2nd Governor-General of Fiji (d. 1989)
- November 8
  - June Havoc, Canadian-born American actress (d. 2010)
  - Stylianos Pattakos, Greek military officer (d. 2016)
- November 10
  - Birdie Tebbetts, American baseball player, manager (d. 1999)
  - Jean-Hilaire Aubame, Gabonese politician (d. 1989)
- November 13 – Claude Pompidou, wife of French President Georges Pompidou (d. 2007)
- November 14 – Barbara Hutton, American socialite (d. 1979)
- November 16 – W. E. D. Ross, Canadian writer (d. 1995)
- November 19 – George Emil Palade, Romanian microbiologist, recipient of the Nobel Prize in Physiology or Medicine (d. 2008)
- November 20 – Otto von Habsburg, Emperor of Austria, King of Hungary in exile (d. 2011)
- November 21 – Eleanor Powell, American actress, dancer (d. 1982)
- November 23 – Virginia Prince, American transgender activist (d. 2009)
- November 30
  - Gordon Parks, African-American photographer, artist (d. 2006)
  - Nihat Erim, Turkish politician, jurist and 30th Prime Minister of Turkey (assassinated) (d. 1980)

=== December ===
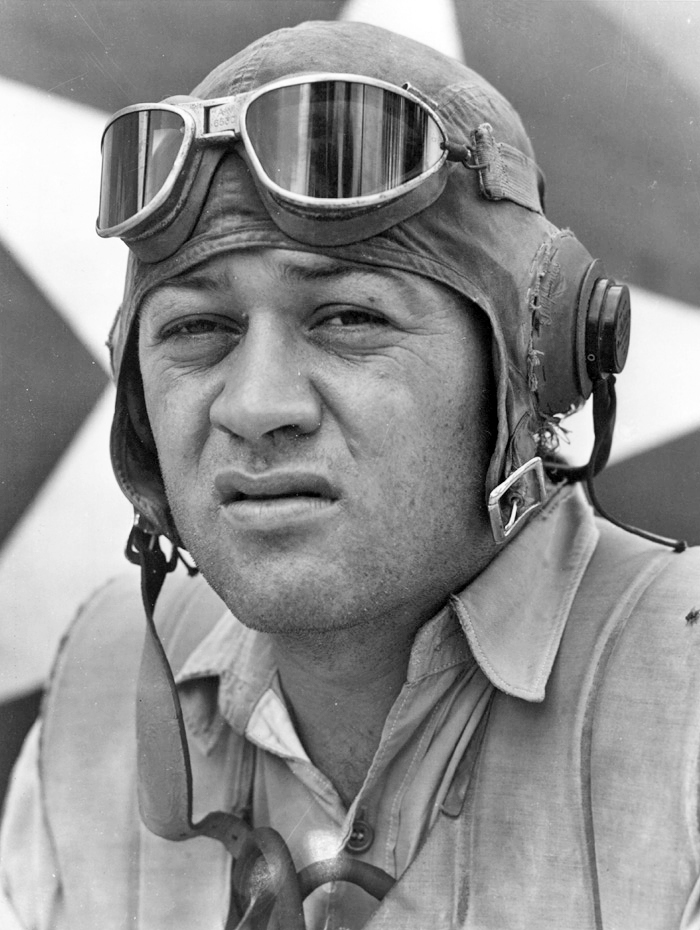
Pappy Boyington

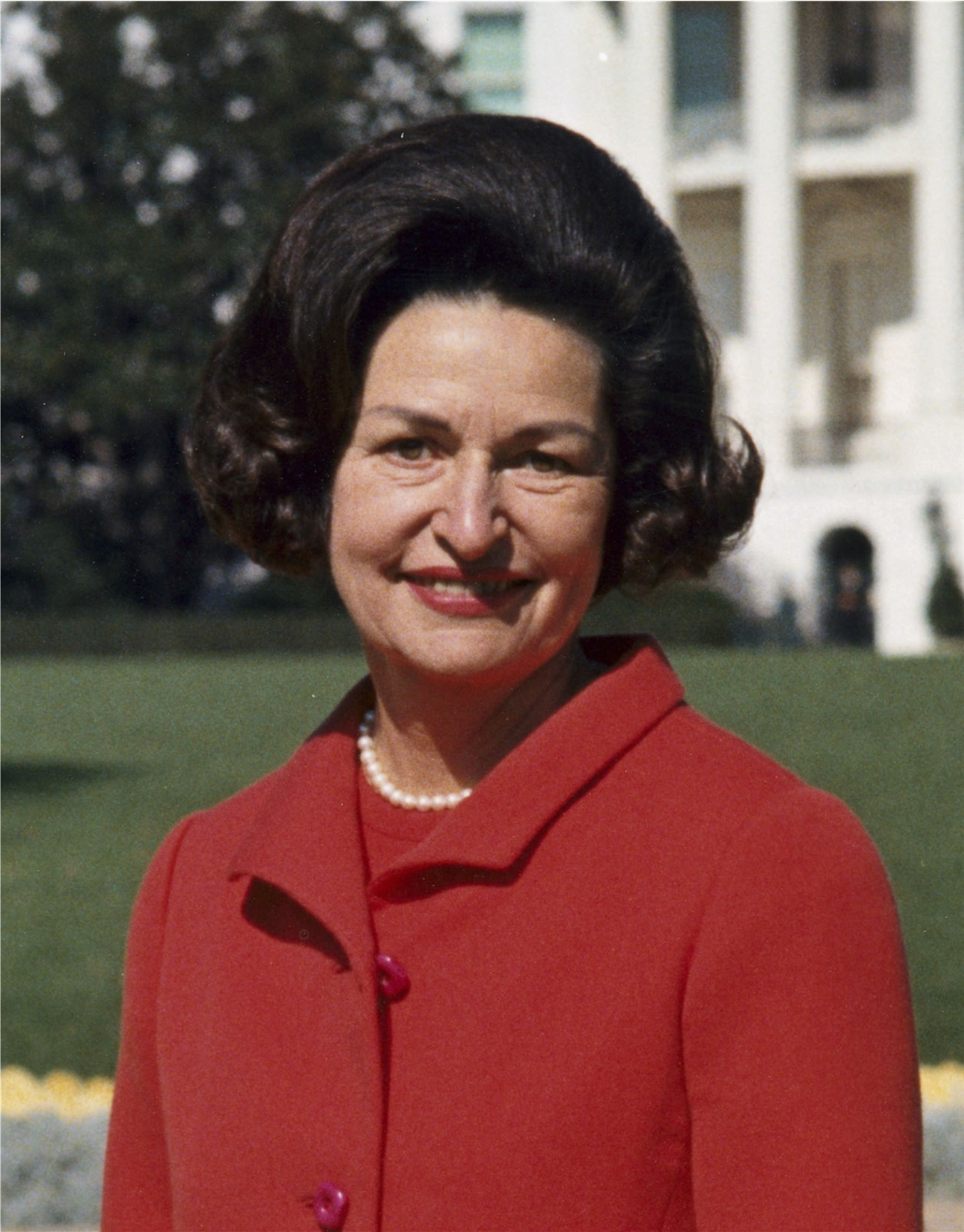
Lady Bird Johnson

- December 1
  - Billy Raimondi, American baseball player (d. 2010)
  - Minoru Yamasaki, Japanese-American architect of the World Trade Center (d. 1986)
- December 2 – Boun Oum, 2-time Prime Minister of Laos (d. 1980)
- December 4 – Pappy Boyington, American pilot, United States Marine Corps fighter ace (d. 1988)
- December 5
  - Keisuke Kinoshita, Japanese film director (d. 1998)
  - Sonny Boy Williamson II, American blues singer, musician and songwriter (d. 1965)
- December 6 – Albert Dusch, German referee (d. 2012)
- December 11 – Carlo Ponti, Italian film producer (d. 2007)
- December 12 – Henry Armstrong, American boxer (d. 1988)
- December 14 – Alfred Lennon, British merchant seaman, amateur musician and father of John Lennon (d. 1976)
- December 17 – Edward Short, British politician (d. 2012)
- December 21 – Jean Conan Doyle, British military officer in the Women's Auxiliary Air Force (d. 1997)
- December 22 – Lady Bird Johnson, First Lady of the United States (d. 2007)
- December 26 – Arsenio Lacson, Filipino politician, sportswriter (d. 1962)

=== Date unknown ===
- Sheikh Mukhtar Mohamed Hussein, Interim President of Somalia (d. 2012)

== Deaths ==
=== January ===
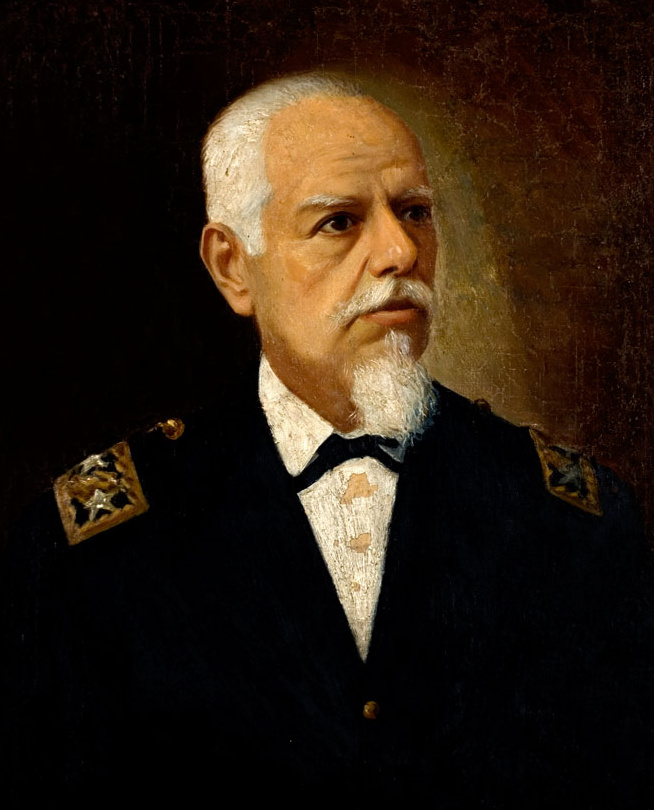
Eloy Alfaro

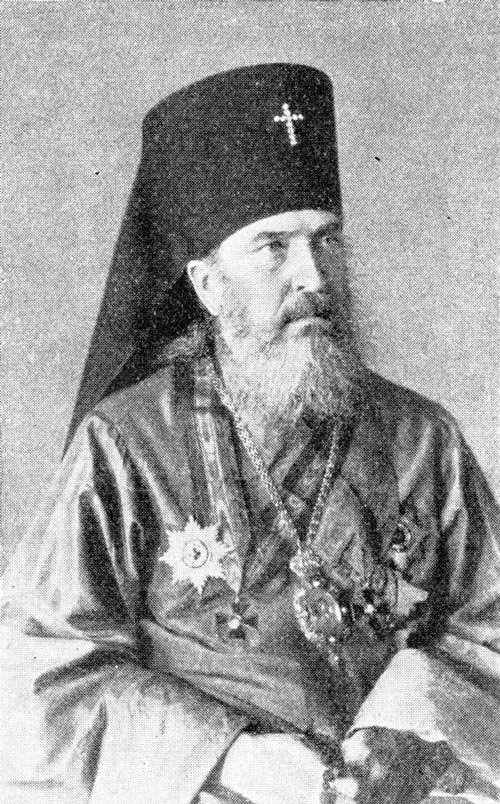
Saint Nicholas of Japan

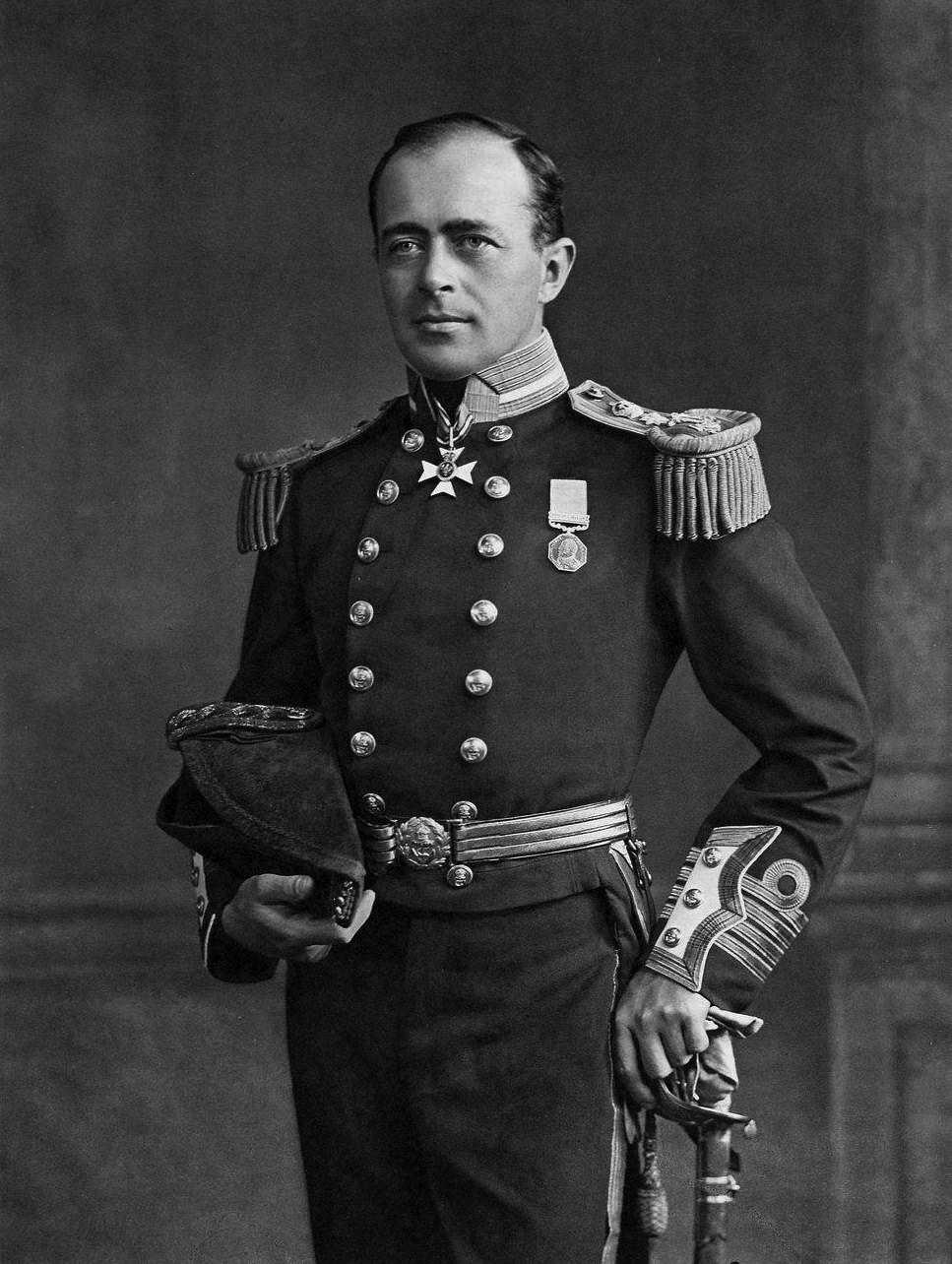
Robert Falcon Scott

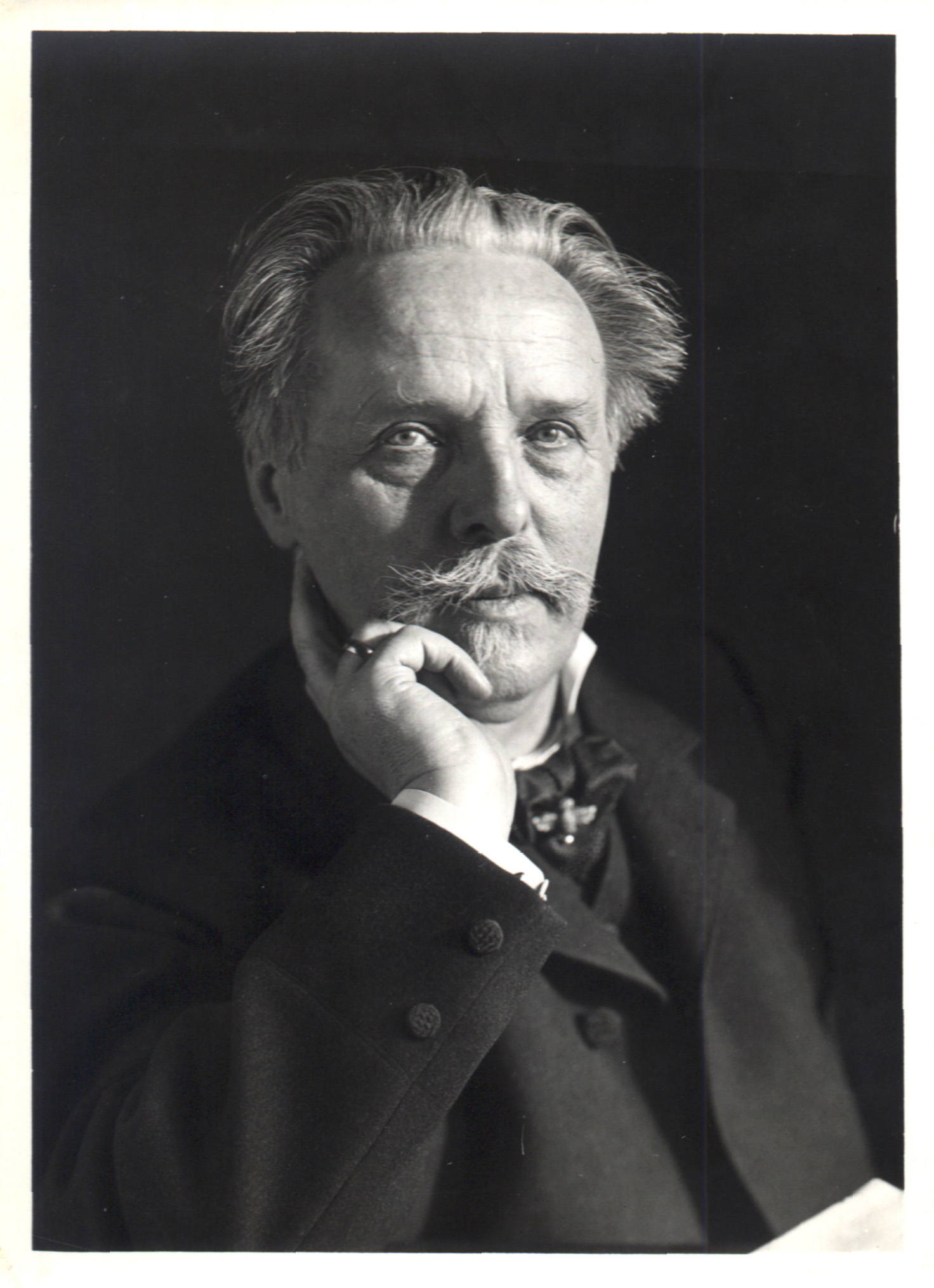
Karl May

- January 3
  - Felix Dahn, German writer (b. 1834)
  - Robley D. Evans, American admiral (b. 1846)
- January 4 – Clarence Dutton, American geologist (b. 1841)
- January 7 – Sophia Jex-Blake, English physician and feminist (b. 1840)
- January 14 – Samuel Waite Johnson, British railway engineer (b. 1831)
- January 16 – Georg Heym, German writer (b. 1887)
- January 28
  - Gustave de Molinari, Belgian economist (b. 1819)
  - Eloy Alfaro, 2-Time President of Ecuador (b. 1842)
- January 29
  - Herman Bang, Danish writer (b. 1857)
  - Alexander Duff, 1st Duke of Fife, Scottish aristocrat and politician (b. 1849)
- January 30 – Luis Cordero Crespo, 14th President of Ecuador (b. 1833)

=== February ===
- February 4 – Franz Reichelt, Austrian-born French tailor and inventor (b. 1879)
- February 9 – Hyacinthe Loyson, French preacher and theologian (b. 1827)
- February 10 – Joseph Lister, English surgeon (b. 1827)
- February 11 – Agustín Lizárraga, Peruvian explorer and farmer, discoverer of Machu Picchu, drowned (b. 1865)
- February 16 – Nicholas of Japan, Eastern Orthodox monk and saint (b. 1836)
- February 17
  - Count Alois Lexa von Aehrenthal, foreign minister (Austria-Hungary) (b. 1854)
  - Edgar Evans, Welsh naval officer, member of the Scott expedition to the South Pole (b. 1876)
- February 21 – Osborne Reynolds, Irish physicist (b. 1842)
- February 25 – William IV, Grand Duke of Luxembourg (b. 1852)
- February 28
  - Henry Hendrickson, United States Navy seaman (b. 1875)
  - Bill Storer, English footballer and cricketer (b. 1867)

=== March ===
- March 1
  - George Grossmith, English actor and comic writer (b. 1847)
  - Ludvig Holstein-Ledreborg, Prime Minister of Denmark (b. 1839)
- March 3 – Oskar Enqvist, Russian admiral (b. 1849)
- March 4 – Augusto Aubry, Italian admiral and politician (b. 1849)
- March 17
  - Anna Filosofova, Russian feminist activist (b. 1837)
  - Lawrence Oates, English army officer, member of the Scott expedition to the South Pole (b. 1880; hypothermia)
- March 22 – Ruggero Oddi, Italian physiologist and anatomist (b. 1864)
- March 29 – Remaining members of the Scott expedition to the South Pole:
  - Henry Robertson Bowers, Scottish naval officer (b. 1883)
  - Robert Falcon Scott, British naval officer and explorer (b. 1868)
  - Edward Adrian Wilson, English physician and naturalist (b. 1872)
- March 30 – Karl May, German author (b. 1842)
- March 31 – Robert Love Taylor, American congressman, senator and Governor from Tennessee (b. 1850)

=== April ===
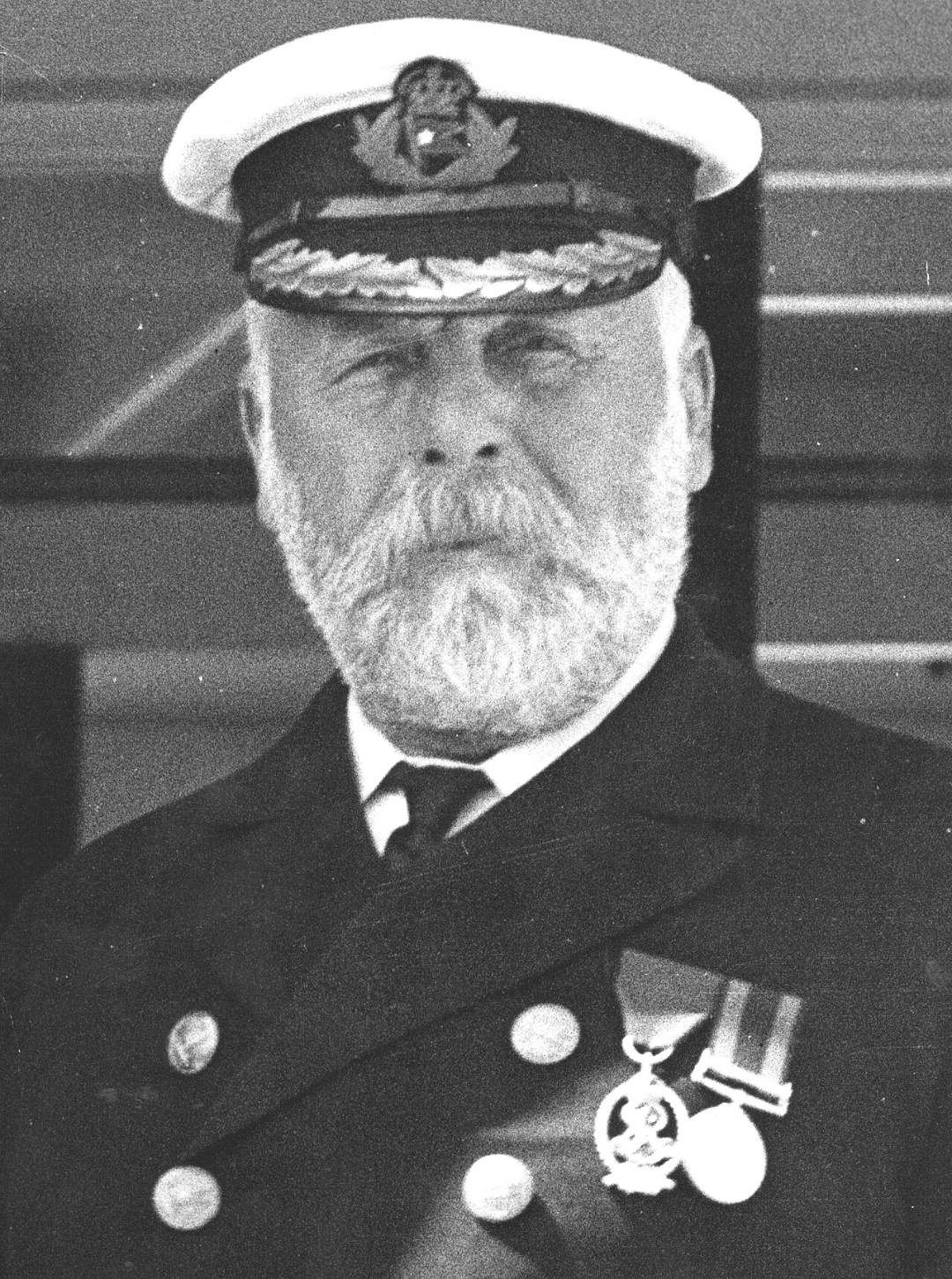
Edward Smith

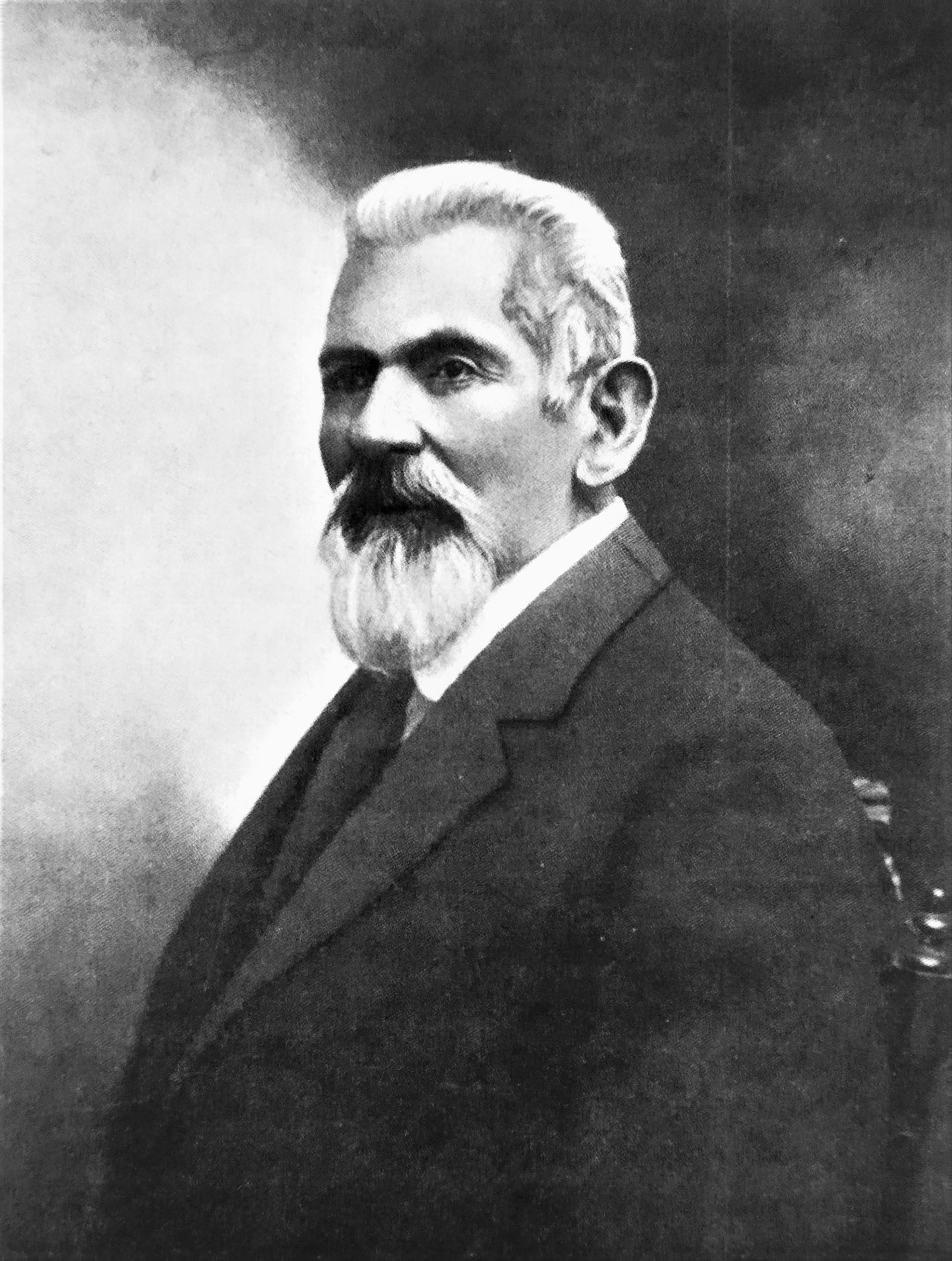
Patricio Escobar

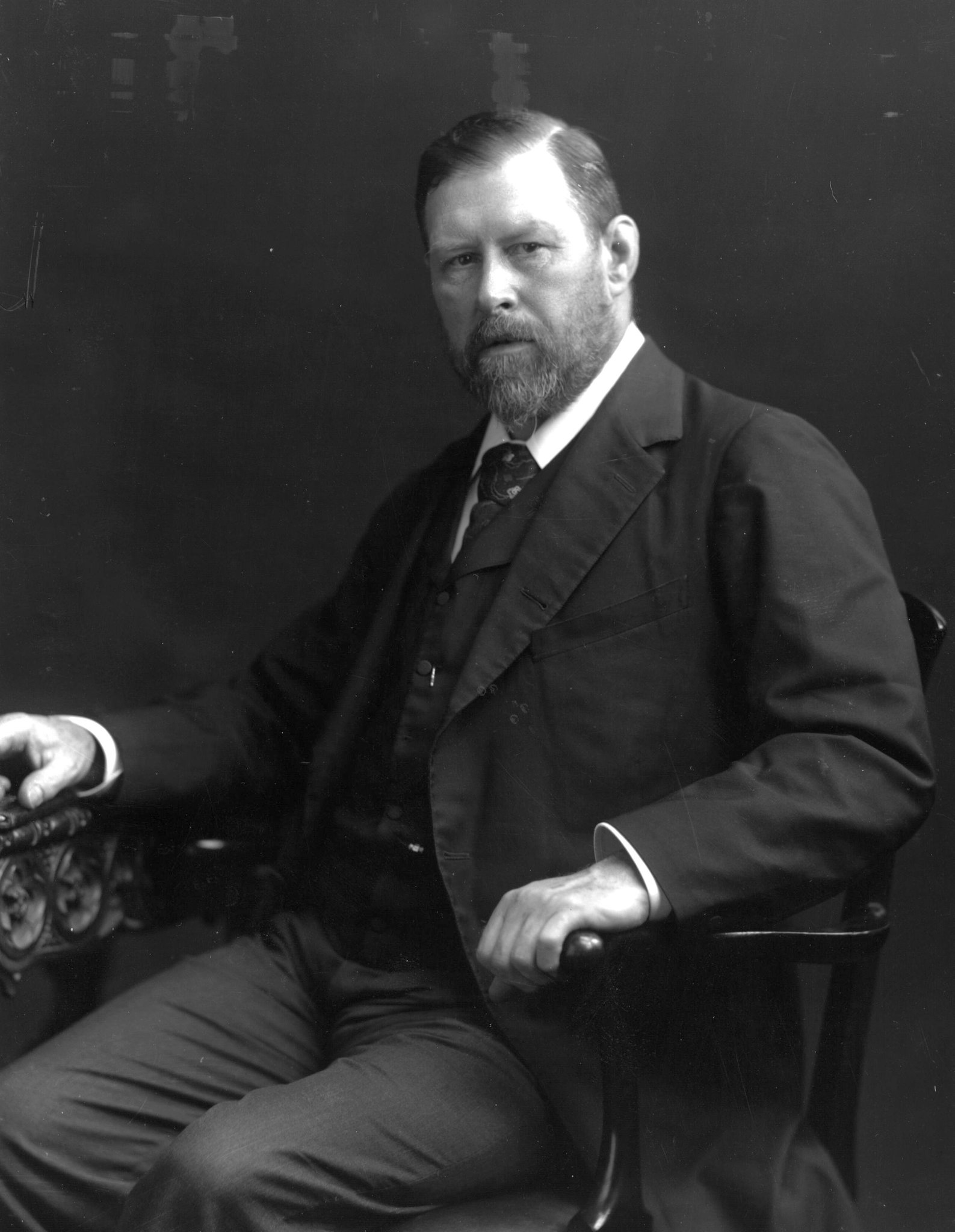
Bram Stoker

- April 3 – Calbraith Perry Rodgers, American aviation pioneer, in aircraft accident (b. 1879)
- April 6 – Giovanni Pascoli, Italian poet (b. 1855)
- April 10 – Gabriel Monod, French historian (b. 1844)
- April 12
  - Clara Barton, American nurse (b. 1821)
  - Frederick Dent Grant, American soldier and statesman (b. 1850)
- April 13 – Ishikawa Takuboku, Japanese author (b. 1886)
- April 14 – Henri Brisson, French statesman (b. 1835)
- April 15 – 1,517 victims of the sinking of the RMS Titanic, including:
  - Thomas Andrews, Irish shipbuilder (b. 1873)
  - John Jacob Astor IV, American businessman (b. 1864)
  - Archibald Butt, American presidential aide (b. 1865)
  - Thomas Byles, British Catholic priest (b. 1870)
  - Jacques Futrelle, American mystery author and journalist (b. 1875)
  - Luigi Gatti, Italian-born restaurateur (b. 1875)
  - Sidney Leslie Goodwin, English toddler; youngest victim of the Titanic disaster, unidentified until 2007 (b. 1910)
  - Benjamin Guggenheim, American businessman (b. 1865)
  - Henry B. Harris, American theater producer (b. 1866)
  - Wallace Hartley, English ship's bandleader and violinist (b. 1878)
  - Charles Melville Hays, American railroad executive (b. 1856)
  - Francis Davis Millet, American painter, sculptor and writer (b. 1846)
  - Clarence Moore, American businessman and sportsman (b. 1865)
  - William McMaster Murdoch, First Officer of the Titanic (b. 1873)
  - Jack Phillips, English ship's senior wireless officer (b. 1887)
  - Edward Smith, English ship's captain (b. 1850)
  - William Thomas Stead, English campaigning journalist (b. 1849)
  - Isidor Straus, German American department store owner (Macy's) and member of United States House of Representatives (b. 1845)
  - Ida Straus, German American wife of Isidor Straus (1 of only 5 Titanic first-class female fatalities) (b. 1849)
  - John B. Thayer, American businessman and sportsman (b. 1862)
  - Frank M. Warren Sr., American businessman (b. 1848)
  - George Dunton Widener, American businessman (b. 1861)
  - Harry Elkins Widener, American bibliophile, son of George Dunton Widener (b. 1885)
  - Henry Tingle Wilde, Chief Officer of the Titanic (b. 1872)
- April 18 – Martha Ripley, American physician and suffragist (b. 1843)
- April 19 – Patricio Escobar, 9th President of Paraguay (b. 1843)
- April 20 – Bram Stoker, Irish writer (Dracula) (b. 1847)

=== May ===
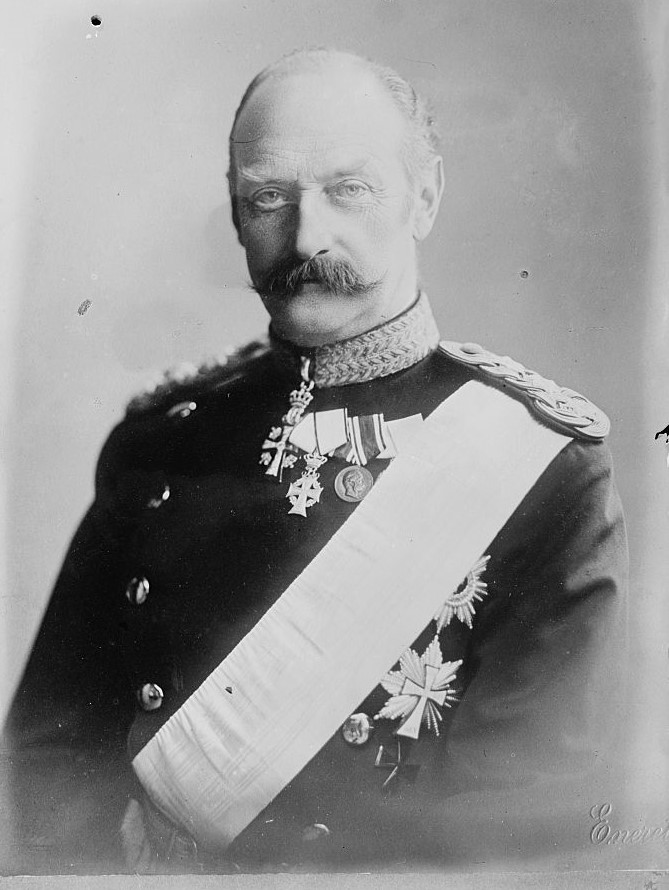
Frederik VIII of Denmark

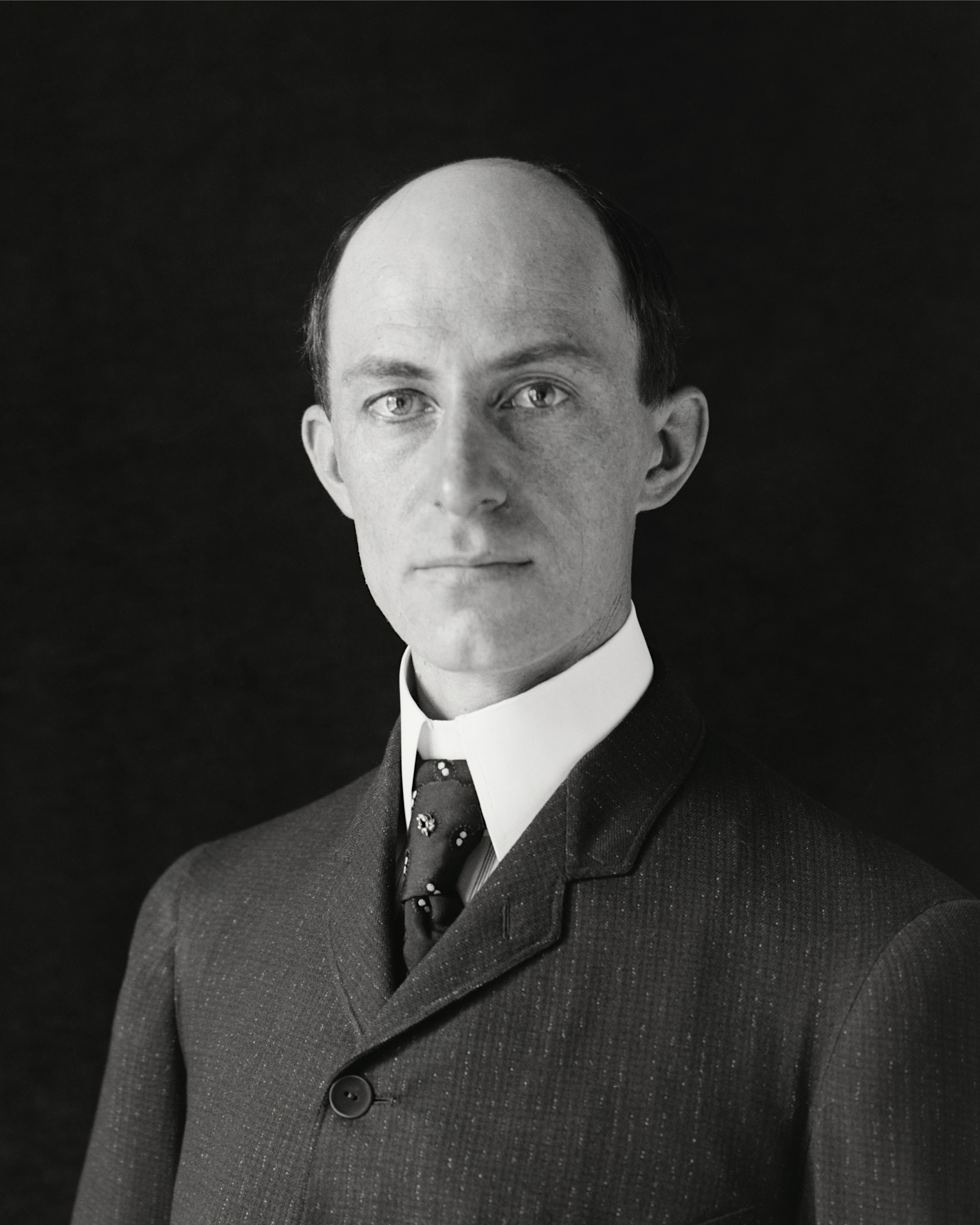
Wilbur Wright

- May 4 – Nettie Stevens, American geneticist credited with discovering sex chromosomes (b. 1861)
- May 5 – Rafael Pombo, Colombian poet (b. 1833)
- May 14
  - Frederik VIII of Denmark (b. 1843)
  - August Strindberg, Swedish playwright and painter (b. 1849)
- May 19
  - Marcelino Menéndez Pelayo, Spanish historian, philologist and literary critic (b. 1856)
  - Bolesław Prus, Polish novelist (b. 1847)
- May 21 – Sir Julius Wernher, German-born British businessman and art collector (b. 1850)
- May 25 – Austin Lane Crothers, American politician (b. 1860)
- May 28 – Paul-Émile Lecoq de Boisbaudran, French chemist (b. 1838)
- May 30 – Wilbur Wright, American aviation pioneer, of typhoid (b. 1867)

=== June ===
- June 1 – Philip Orin Parmelee, American aviator, in aircraft accident (b. 1887)
- June 9 – Ion Luca Caragiale, Romanian writer (b. 1852)
- June 10 – Anton Aškerc, Slovene poet (b. 1856)
- June 11 – Léon Dierx, French poet (Les Amants) (b. 1838)
- June 12 – Frédéric Passy, French economist, recipient of the Nobel Peace Prize (b. 1822)
- June 16 – Thomas Pollock Anshutz, American painter (b. 1851)
- June 24 – Sir George White, British field marshal (b. 1835)
- June 25
  - Sir Lawrence Alma-Tadema, Dutch-born British painter, died in Germany (b. 1836)
  - Louis-Joseph Antoine, Belgian miner and sect leader
  - Hubert Latham, French aviator (b. 1883)
- June 27
  - George Bonnor, Australian cricketer (b. 1855)
  - Frank Furness, American architect (b. 1839)
- June 30 – Eduardo Blanco, Venezuelan writer and politician (b. 1838)

=== July ===
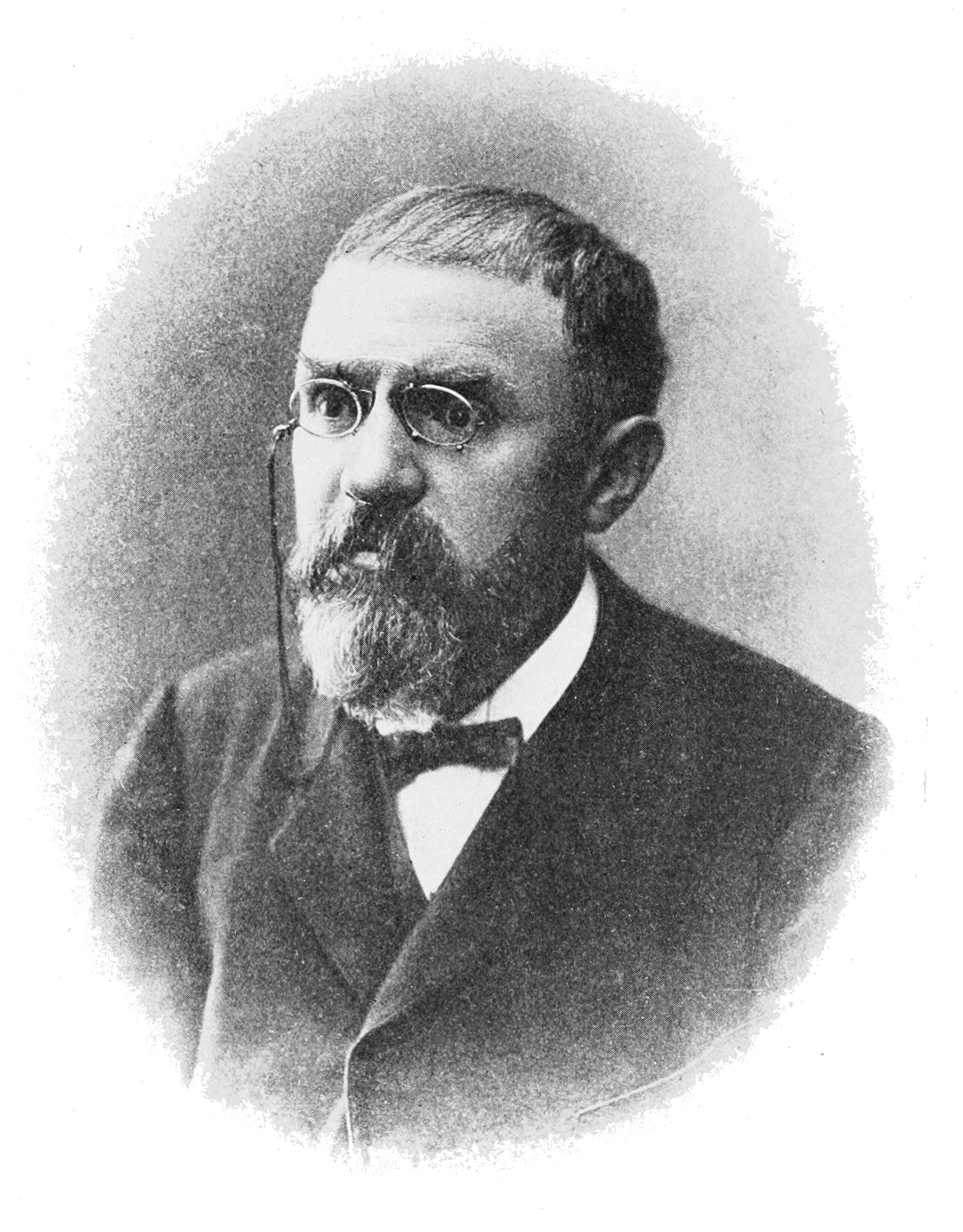
Henri Poincaré

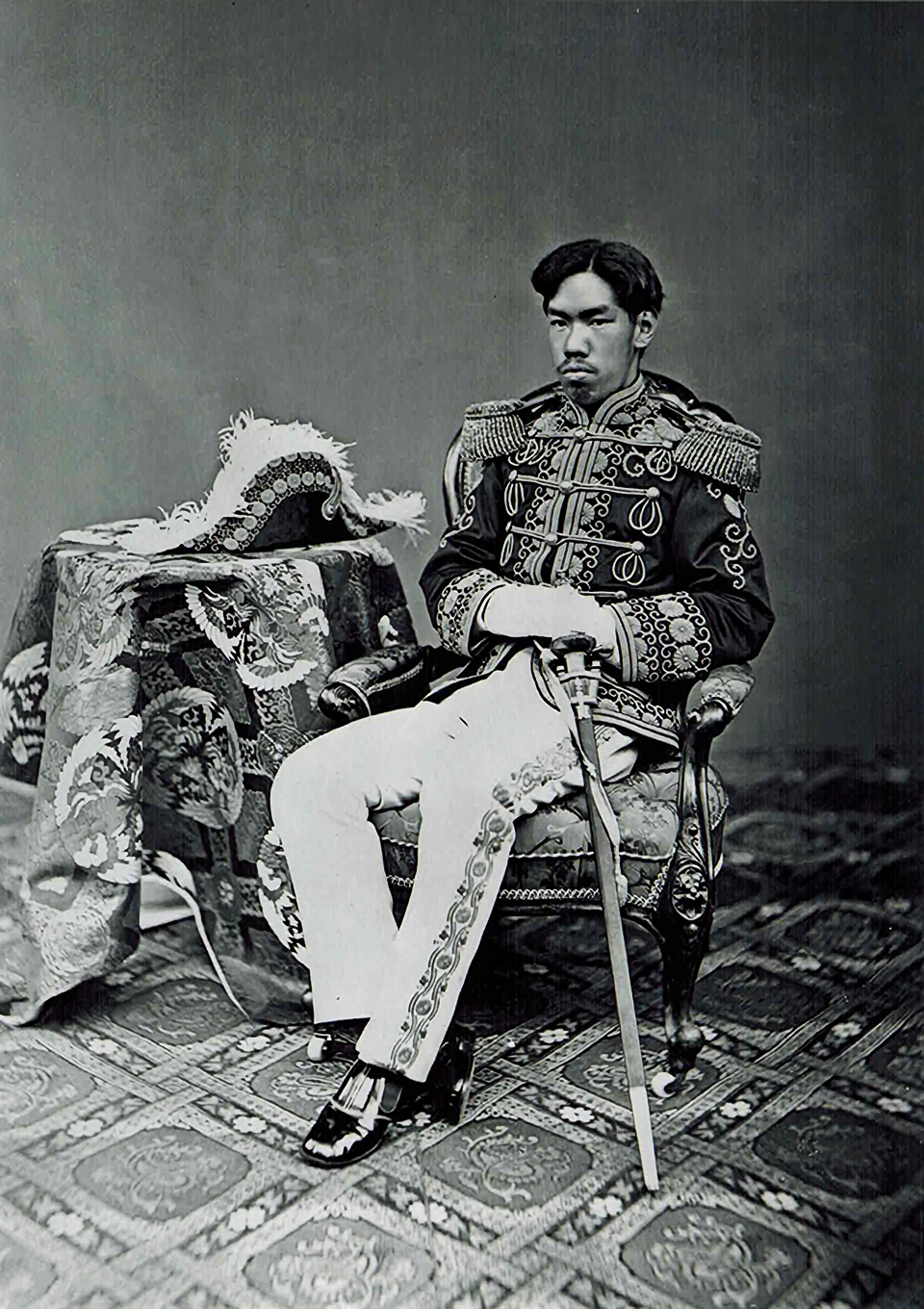
Emperor Meiji

- July 1 – Harriet Quimby, American aviator (b. 1875)
- July 2 – Tom Richardson, English cricketer (b. 1870)
- July 5 – Robert Sutherland, Canadian politician, Ontario MPP
- July 14 – Belle L. Pettigrew, American educator, missionary (b. 1839)
- July 15 – Francisco Lázaro, Portuguese marathon runner (Olympics) (b. 1888)
- July 17 – Henri Poincaré, French mathematician (b. 1854)
- July 30
  - Emperor Meiji of Japan (b. 1852)
  - Juan Gualberto González, 11th President of Paraguay (b. 1851)
- July 31 – Allan Octavian Hume, British civil servant (b. 1829)

=== August ===
- August 7 – François-Alphonse Forel, Swiss hydrologist (b. 1841)
- August 8 – Ross Winn, American anarchist writer and publisher (b. 1871)
- August 13 – Jules Massenet, French composer (b. 1842)
- August 20
  - William Booth, English founder of the Salvation Army (b. 1829)
  - Walter Goodman, English painter, illustrator and author (b. 1838)

=== September ===
- September 1 – Samuel Coleridge-Taylor, African-British composer (b. 1875)
- September 5 – Arthur MacArthur Jr., U.S. Army general (b. 1845)
- September 6 – Sir Charles John Stanley Gough, British general and Victoria Cross recipient (b. 1832)
- September 7 – Martin Kähler, German theologian (b. 1835)
- September 12 – Pierre-Hector Coullié, Cardinal-Archbishop of Lyon (b. 1829)
- September 13 – Nogi Maresuke, Japanese general (suicide) (b. 1849)
- September 28 – Frederick Richards, British admiral (b. 1833)
- September 30 – Frances Allitsen, English song composer (b. 1848)

=== October ===
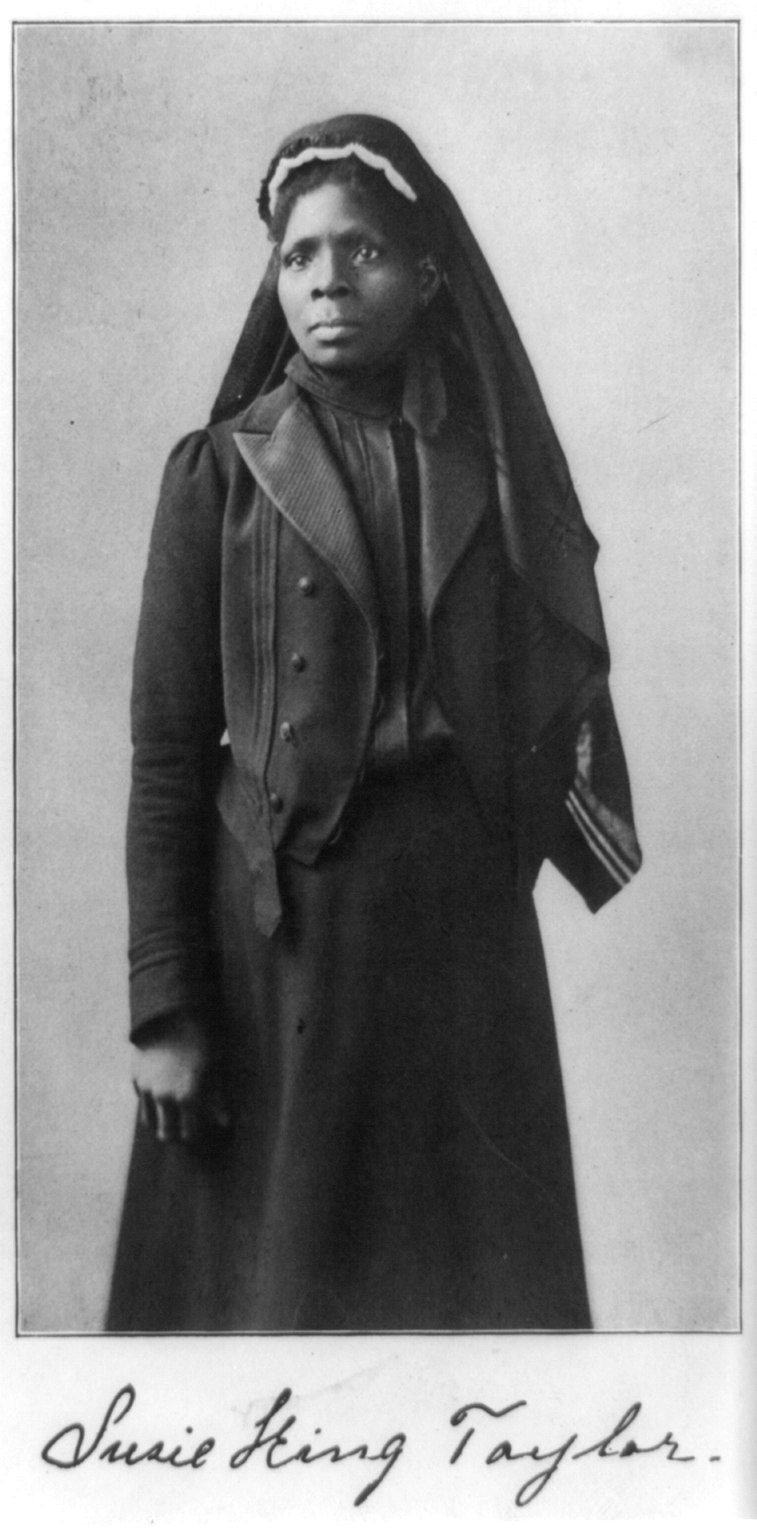
Susie King Taylor

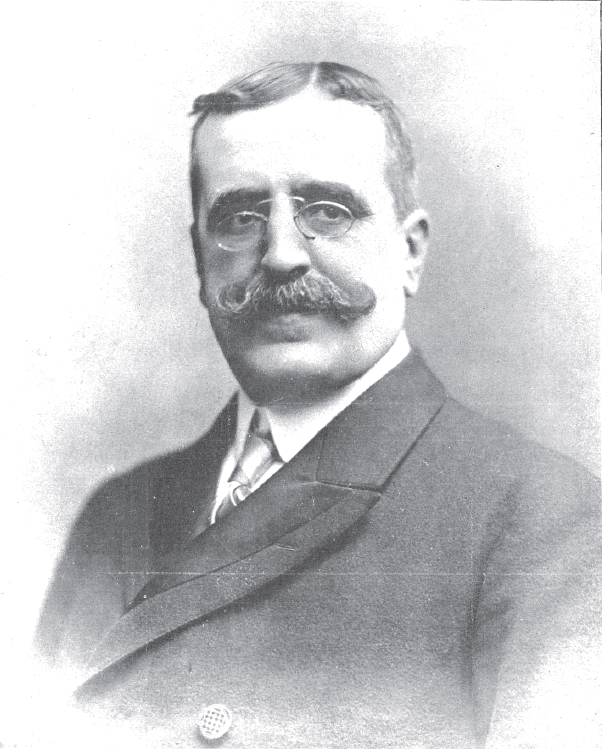
José Canalejas y Méndez

- October 6
  - October 6 – Auguste Beernaert, Belgian statesman, recipient of the Nobel Peace Prize (b. 1829)
  - October 6 – Susie King Taylor, African-American army nurse. First nurse of the Black Army (b. 1848)
- October 8 – Wilhelm Kuhe, German composer (b. 1823)
- October 10 – Harry Kraton, African American juggler and tightrope walker (b. 1883)
- October 24 – Mykola Lysenko, Ukrainian composer (b. 1842)
- October 30 – James S. Sherman, 27th Vice President of the United States (b. 1855)

=== November ===
- November 1 – Homer Lea, American adventurer and writer (b. 1876)
- November 8 – Dugald Drummond, British railway engineer (b. 1840)
- November 9 – Charlotte A. Gray, British educator and temperance missionary (b. 1844)
- November 10 – Louis Cyr, Canadian strongman (b. 1863)
- November 11
  - Khan Bahadur Abdul Majid Chowdhury, Bengali educationist (b. 1860)
  - William White Miller, Irish Canadian businessman (b. 1846)
- November 12 – José Canalejas, Prime Minister of Spain (b. 1854) (assassinated)
- November 17 – Richard Norman Shaw, British architect (b. 1831)
- November 26 – Patriarch Joachim III of Constantinople (b. 1834)

=== December ===
- December 12 – Luitpold, Prince Regent of Bavaria, (b. 1821)
- December 13 – Vital Aza, Spanish playwright (b. 1851)
- December 14 – Belgrave Edward Sutton Ninnis, British explorer and officer (b. 1887)
- December 15
  - December 15 – Sir Thomas Charles Scanlen, South African politician, Prime Minister of Cape Colony (b. 1834)
  - December 15 – Franz Simandl, Double bassist and pedagogue (b. 1840)
- December 18 – William McKendree Carleton, American poet (b. 1845)
- December 23 – Otto Schoetensack, German anthropologist (b. 1850)
- December 29 – Philip H. Cooper, American admiral (b. 1844)

== Nobel Prizes ==

- Physics – Nils Gustaf Dalén
- Chemistry – Victor Grignard, Paul Sabatier
- Medicine – Alexis Carrel
- Literature – Gerhart Johann Robert Hauptmann
- Peace – Elihu Root
