= Roberta McCain =

American political matriarch (1912–2020)

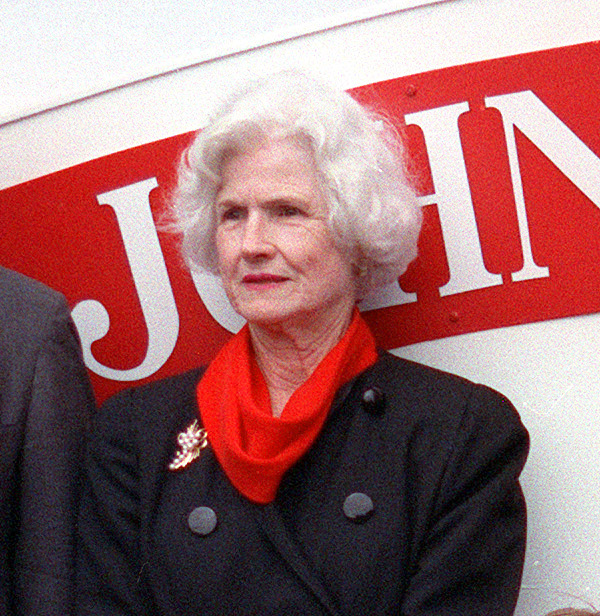
- McCain in 1992 at the launching of USS John S. McCain (DDG-56)
- Born: Roberta Wright; February 7, 1912; Muskogee, Oklahoma, U.S.
- Died: October 12, 2020 (aged 108); Washington, D.C., U.S.
- Resting place: Arlington National Cemetery
- Spouse: John S. McCain Jr. (m. 1933; died 1981)
- Children: 3, including John and Joe
- Relatives: McCain family (by marriage)

Roberta Wright McCain (February 7, 1912 – October 12, 2020) was an American socialite and oil heiress. She was the wife of Admiral John S. McCain Jr., with whom she had three children including U.S. Senator John S. McCain III and stage actor and journalist Joe McCain. McCain was active in the Navy Wives Clubs and her Capitol Hill home was a popular salon for lawmakers and politicians. In 2007 and 2008, she actively campaigned in support of her son John during his presidential bid.

== Early life ==
Roberta Wright and her identical twin sister, Rowena Fay (died August 6, 2011), were born in Muskogee, Oklahoma, on February 7, 1912. She had three additional siblings: Archibald Kidwell Wright, Martha Nadine Wright (married to Bert Andrews) and Alexander Franklin Wright. Their parents were Archibald Grahee Wright, a Los Angeles oil wildcatter, and Myrtle Mae Wright (née Fletcher). Her father became a stay-at-home dad after gaining wealth from the oil industry and the family traveled constantly, with trips every summer during August. They settled in Los Angeles and she was primarily raised there.

== Marriage and family ==
On January 21, 1933, Wright eloped in Tijuana, Baja California, Mexico, with John S. McCain Jr., a U.S. naval ensign who would later become a four-star admiral. At the time, Wright was attending the University of Southern California and McCain was attached to USS Oklahoma (BB-37). In 1952, Roberta McCain was the ship sponsor for USS John S. McCain (DL-3), named for her father-in-law. She was also an honored guest at the 1992 launching of USS John S. McCain (DDG-56) which was named for her husband and her father-in-law. She was also active in Navy Wives Clubs. For example, during Christmas 1971, she traveled to Saigon and presented $1,000 ($7,950 today) and 14 boxes of clothing to the Vietnam Advisory Board of Operation Helping Hand on behalf of the Pearl Harbor area Navy Wives Clubs.

McCain gave birth to three children, one daughter and two sons: Jean Alexandra "Sandy" (McCain) Morgan (1934–2019), John Sidney McCain III (1936–2018), and Joseph Pinckney "Joe" McCain II (born 1942). She also had 12 grandchildren (one of whom is Meghan McCain), 16 great-grandchildren, and six great-great-grandchildren. The McCain family was Episcopalian and Roberta McCain said faith is important for her family. She sent her son, John McCain, to an Episcopalian high school, and kept his prayer book. She raised her children while living in Capitol Hill. McCain was a successful socialite who used her home as a salon for lawmakers, which helped her husband's military career. She hosted breakfasts for politicians and other prominent figures. She was friends with many public figures including British military officer Louis Mountbatten, 1st Earl Mountbatten of Burma, oil industrialist J. Paul Getty, and writer and ambassador Clare Boothe Luce.

After John S. McCain III was taken prisoner during the Vietnam War, John S. McCain Jr. and Roberta McCain awaited his release at Pearl Harbor. On November 1, 1967, Roberta McCain wrote to President Lyndon B. Johnson, expressing her support of his policies in Vietnam as a "parent of a son who was shot down in Hanoi, last week, and is now a prisoner-of-war ..." In June 1968, Roberta McCain told Parade magazine, "Religion has been of great importance to us in our concern for Johnny, religion and the military tradition of my husband's family. We all pray for the time when we'll see Johnny again."

In 1971, McCain requested no special sympathy in regard to her son's captivity. She stated that Navy tradition was important in the family; her daughter married a naval officer, John S. McCain III became a naval aviator, and her younger son Joe enlisted in the Navy during the Vietnam War. John S. McCain III was held as a prisoner of war in North Vietnam for five-and-a-half years. When notified upon his release on March 15, 1973, that he had shouted expletives at his captors, Roberta McCain's response was, "Johnny, I'm going to come over there and wash your mouth out with soap."

John S. McCain III said this of his mother: "My mother was raised to be a strong, determined woman who thoroughly enjoyed life, and always tried to make the most of her opportunities. She was encouraged to accept, graciously and with good humor, the responsibilities and sacrifices her choices have required of her. I am grateful to her for the strengths she taught me by example."

== Later life ==
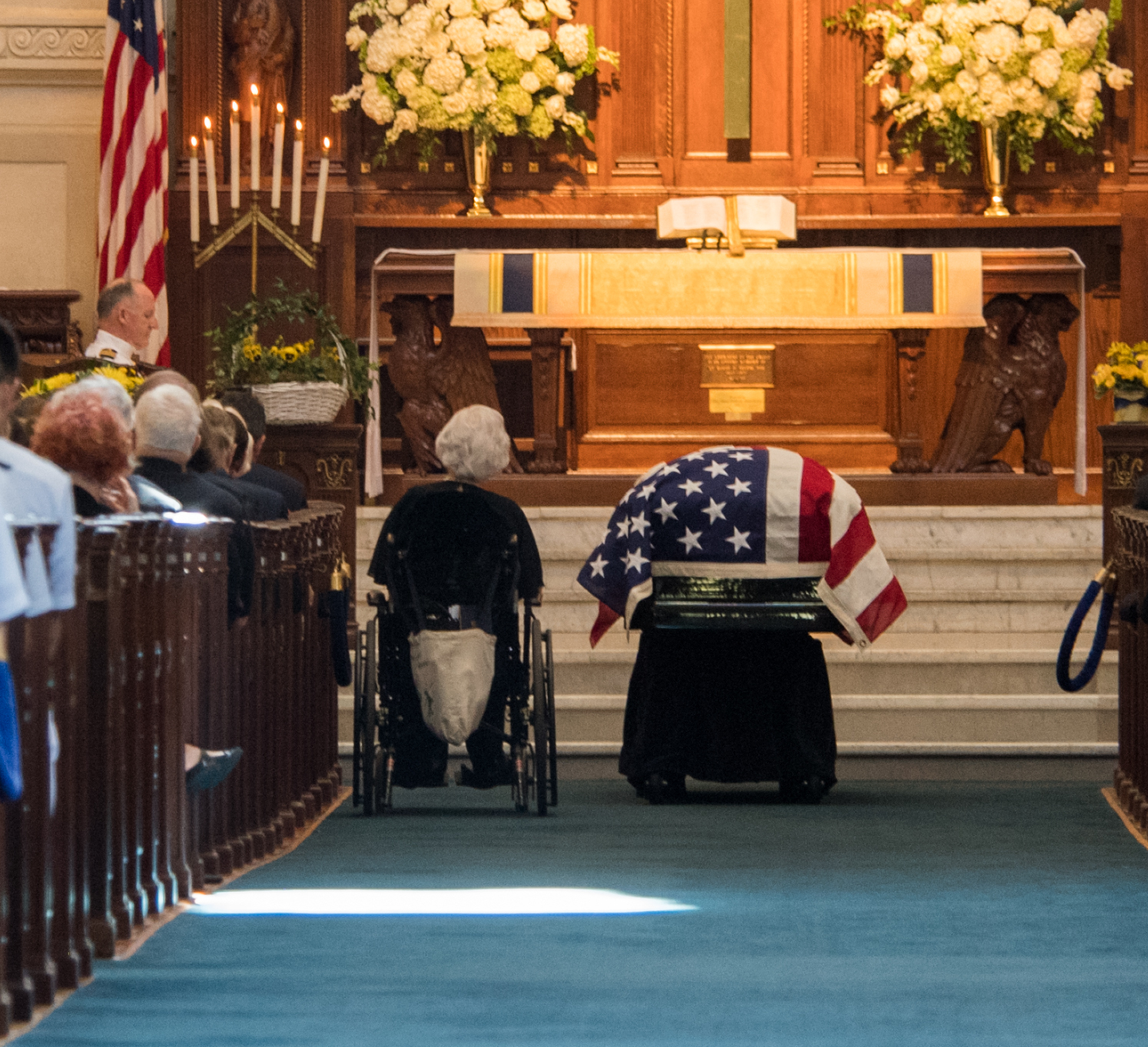
Roberta beside her son John McCain's casket

McCain campaigned during her son's 2008 presidential bid, and was active in 2007 and 2008 despite her advanced age. In November 2007, her comments during an MSNBC interview about Mitt Romney, his role in organizing the 2002 Winter Olympics, and his Mormonism generated minor political controversy and forced her son to respond to clarify her remarks. In August 2008, she had a fashion shoot and was featured in a pair of Vogue magazine articles. On May 13, 2009, she appeared on The Tonight Show with Jay Leno. McCain's comments about Rush Limbaugh and Keith Olbermann created a stir with politicos on both sides even after her son's failed presidential bid.

McCain's life of traveling with family, specifically her twin sister, was noted by Maureen Orth in The New York Times in December 2007. On October 22, 2009, she was hospitalized while traveling in Portugal after she fell and injured her head.

For her 100th birthday in 2012, she had a small party at the Capitol Hill Club. A few weeks after her 100th birthday, McCain suffered a mild stroke. McCain's centenary was noted in a number of periodicals in the United States, including an article by Pulitzer Prize–winning journalist Ken Herman. She was featured in Town & Country magazine later that year.

In September 2013, television commentator Greta Van Susteren wrote about McCain in an essay that was featured by Politico during their "Women Rule" series. In September 2013, McCain and her parlor were featured in an article in the peer-reviewed academic journal, the Journal of Urban History.

On the occasion of her 106th birthday in February 2018, members of McCain's family took to social media to express birthday wishes and share memories of McCain over the years. McCain accompanied other members of her family in June 2018 for the Washington, D.C. screening of the documentary John McCain: For Whom the Bell Tolls. Before her son John's death in August 2018, she attended a Capitol Hill event where politicians commemorated the Senator as a living requiem. After her son's death, she attended the ceremony that marked the arrival of his remains to lie in state in the United States Capitol rotunda and attended the funeral at the Washington National Cathedral, where eulogies were given by former presidents Barack Obama and George W. Bush, among others.

McCain died peacefully on October 12, 2020, at the age of 108 at her home in Washington, D.C., 2 years, 48 days after her son John McCain. A funeral service was held for her on November 7, 2020, at All Saints Episcopal Church in Chevy Chase, Maryland. At the time of her death, her son Joe was the only one of her children still living; her daughter Jean McCain Morgan had died of mesothelioma the previous November, aged 85. She was buried next to her husband at Arlington National Cemetery. Cindy McCain, her widowed daughter-in-law, posted on Twitter, "I couldn't have asked for a better role model or a better friend."
