= November Group =

November Group may refer to:

- November Group (German), a 1918 German political group of artists
- November Group (Finland), a Finnish group of Expressionist artists
- November Group (band), a Boston-based music group
