= USS John S. McCain (DDG-56) =

US Navy Arleigh Burke-class destroyer

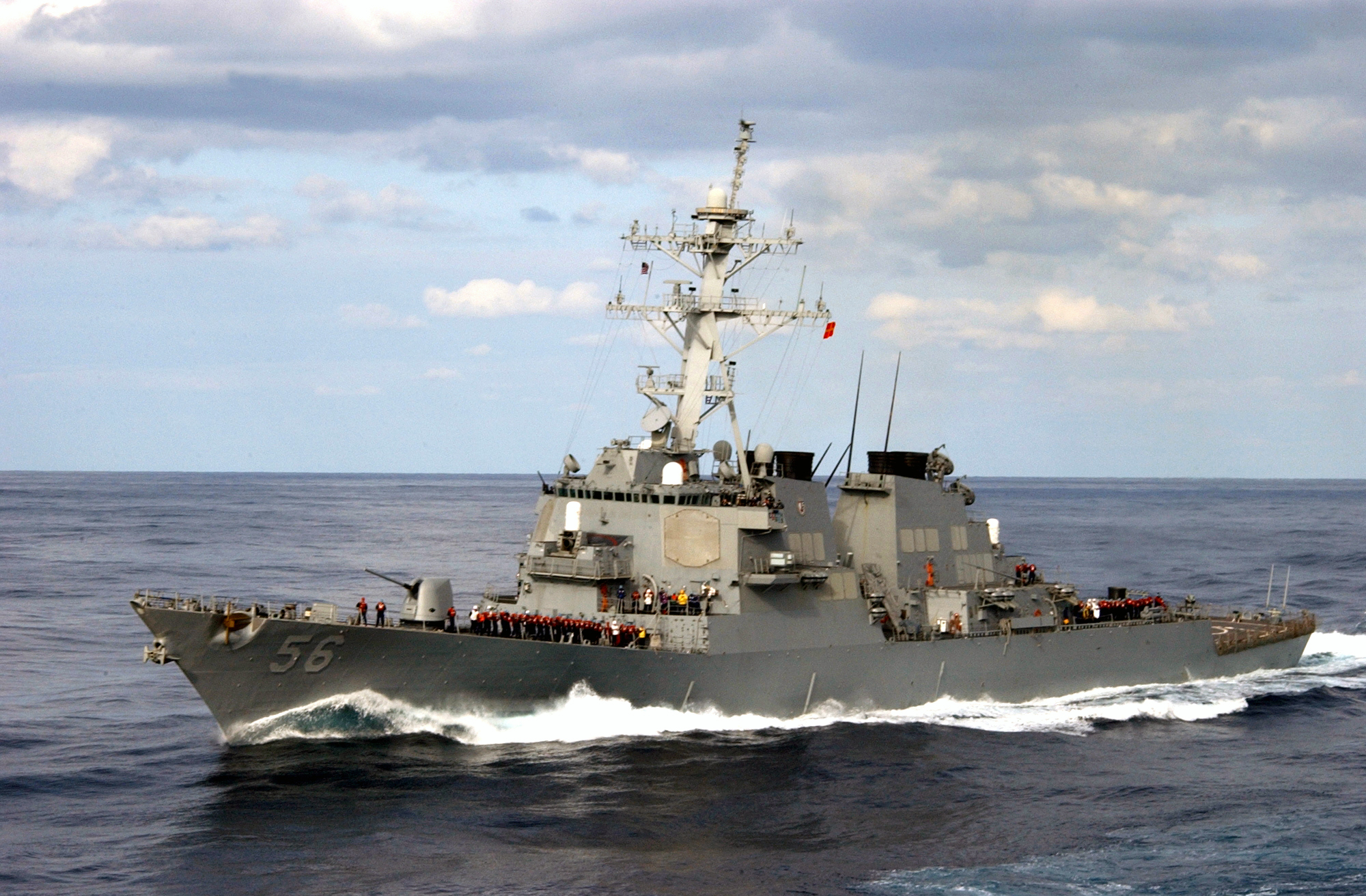
- USS John S. McCain (DDG-56)

History

United States
- Name: John S. McCain
- Namesake: John S. McCain Sr.; John S. McCain Jr.; John S. McCain III
- Ordered: 13 December 1988
- Builder: Bath Iron Works
- Laid down: 3 September 1991
- Launched: 26 September 1992
- Sponsored by: Cindy McCain
- Commissioned: 2 July 1994
- Home port: Naval Station Everett
- Identification: MMSI number: 368721000; Callsign: NJSM; Hull number: DDG-56
- Motto: Fortune Favors the Brave
- Nickname(s): Big Bad John; Johnny Mac
- Honors and awards: See Awards
- Status: in active service
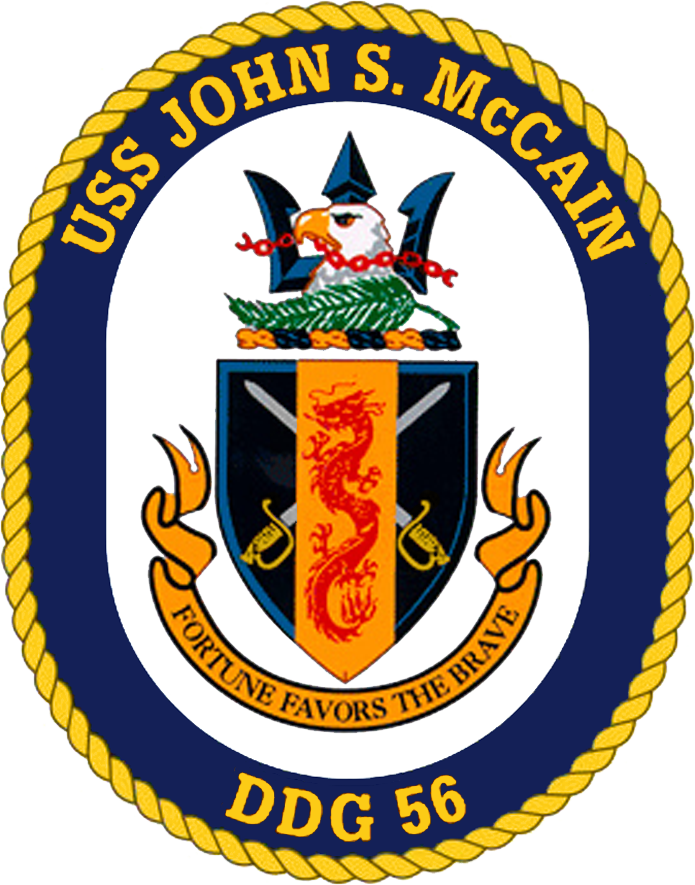
- Badge

General characteristics
- Class & type: Arleigh Burke-class destroyer
- Displacement: Light: approx. 6,800 long tons (6,900 t); Full: approx. 8,900 long tons (9,000 t)
- Length: 505 ft (154 m)
- Beam: 59 ft (18 m)
- Draft: 31 ft (9.4 m)
- Propulsion: 2 × shafts
- Speed: In excess of 30 kn (56 km/h; 35 mph)
- Range: 4,400 nmi (8,100 km; 5,100 mi) at 20 kn (37 km/h; 23 mph)
- Complement: 33 commissioned officers; 38 chief petty officers; 210 enlisted personnel
- Sensors & processing systems: AN/SPY-1D PESA 3D radar (Flight I, II, IIA); AN/SPY-6(V)1 AESA 3D radar (Flight III); AN/SPS-67(V)3 or (V)5 surface search radar (DDG-51 – DDG-118); AN/SPQ-9B surface search radar (DDG-119 onward); AN/SPS-73(V)12 surface search/navigation radar (DDG-51 – DDG-86); BridgeMaster E surface search/navigation radar (DDG-87 onward); 3 × AN/SPG-62 fire-control radar; Mk 46 optical sight system (Flight I, II, IIA); Mk 20 electro-optical sight system (Flight III); AN/SQQ-89 ASW combat system: AN/SQS-53C sonar array; AN/SQR-19 tactical towed array sonar (Flight I, II, IIA); TB-37U multi-function towed array sonar (DDG-113 onward); AN/SQQ-28 LAMPS III shipboard system
- Electronic warfare & decoys: AN/SLQ-32 electronic warfare suite; AN/SLQ-25 Nixie torpedo countermeasures; Mk 36 Mod 12 decoy launching systems; Mk 53 Nulka decoy launching systems; Mk 59 decoy launching systems
- Armament: Guns: 1 × 5-inch (127 mm)/54 mk 45 mod 1/2 (lightweight gun); 2 × 20 mm (0.8 in) Phalanx CIWS; 2 × 25 mm (0.98 in) Mk 38 machine gun system; 4 × 0.50 inches (12.7 mm) caliber guns; Missiles: 2 × Mk 141 Harpoon anti-ship missile launcher; 1 × 29-cell, 1 × 61-cell (90 total cells) Mk 41 vertical launching system (VLS): RIM-66M surface-to-air missile; RIM-156 surface-to-air missile; BGM-109 Tomahawk cruise missile; RUM-139 vertical launch ASROC; Torpedoes: 2 × Mark 32 triple torpedo tubes: Mark 46 lightweight torpedo; Mark 50 lightweight torpedo; Mark 54 lightweight torpedo
- Aircraft carried: 1 × Sikorsky MH-60R

USS John S. McCain (DDG-56) is an Arleigh Burke-class (Flight I) Aegis guided missile destroyer currently in the service of the United States Navy. She is part of the Destroyer Squadron 23 within the Third Fleet, and has her homeport at Naval Station Everett in Everett, Washington.

The destroyer was involved in a collision with the tanker ship Alnic MC on 21 August 2017 off the coast of Singapore, which resulted in the deaths of 10 of her crew, and left another five injured. The damage put the ship out of operational status for over two years, with completion in October 2019.

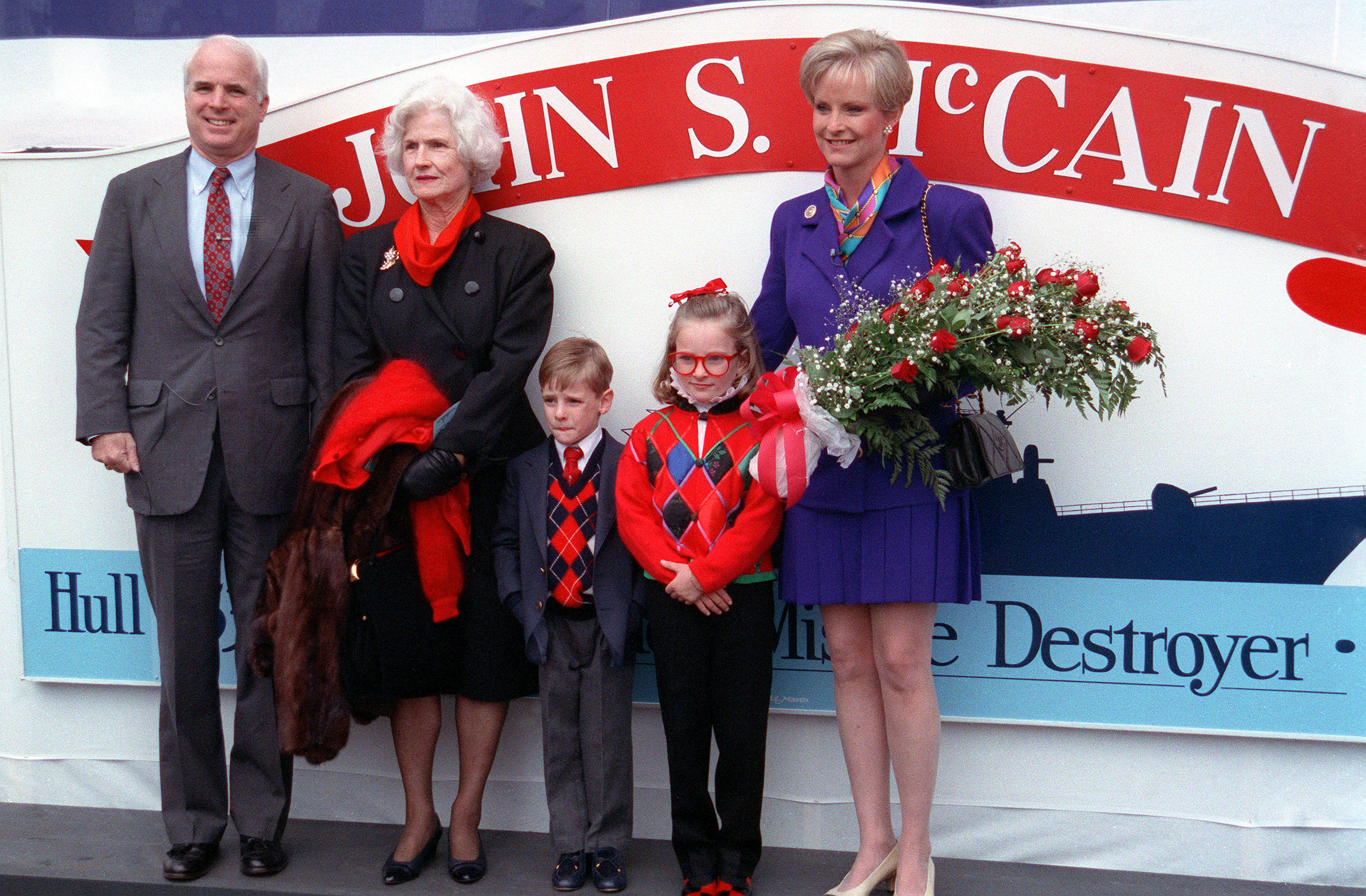
McCain family at ship's launching: 26 September 1992

== Naming ==
This warship was originally named after John S. McCain Sr., and John S. McCain Jr., both admirals in the United States Navy. John S. McCain Sr. commanded the aircraft carrier USS Ranger, and later the Fast Carrier Task Force during the latter stages of World War II. John S. McCain Jr. commanded the submarines USS Gunnel and USS Dentuda during World War II. He subsequently held a number of posts, rising to commander-in-chief of the United States Pacific Command, before retiring in 1972. These men were, respectively, the grandfather and father of Vietnam War Navy captain and later Senator John S. McCain III.

On 11 July 2018, at a rededication ceremony, Senator John McCain was added as a namesake, along with his father and grandfather.

The ship's nickname is "Big Bad John", and has the motto "Fortune Favors the Brave".

== Service history ==
=== Construction and commissioning ===
John S. McCain's keel was laid down on 3 September 1991, at the Bath Iron Works in Bath, Maine. She was launched on 26 September 1992, sponsored by Cindy McCain, the wife of Senator John McCain III, and was commissioned on 2 July 1994, at the Bath Iron Works with Commander John K. Ross as the first commanding officer. The former President of the United States, George H. W. Bush, was the ceremony's principal speaker. Her maiden deployment was from 10 November 1995 to 10 May 1996 to the 5th and 7th fleets with visits to Kochi, India, Fremantle and Newcastle Australia and Suva, Fiji. After the ship returned to her home port in Pearl Harbor, Hawaii, she shifted to the forward-deploy port in Yokosuka, Japan, in June 1997. In October 1997, she visited the port of Qingdao China, the first visit to Communist China other than Hong Kong, in 15 years.

=== 2000s ===
In January 2003, John S. McCain deployed to the Persian Gulf. She launched 39 Tomahawk missiles in support of the invasion of Iraq and was awarded the Navy Unit Commendation for her service. John S. McCain was awarded the Navy Battle E for DESRON 15 in 2003 and again in 2004. On 16 February 2007, John S. McCain was awarded the 2006 Battle Effectiveness Award.

On 11 June 2009, a Chinese submarine reportedly collided with the towed sonar array of John S. McCain near Subic Bay, Philippines. The incident caused damage to the array, but was described as an "inadvertent encounter".

In June 2009, John S. McCain pursued the North Korean cargo ship Kang Nam 1 toward Burma in enforcement of the new United Nations resolution of an arms export embargo against North Korea. The vessel was suspected of carrying arms for the Burmese junta government. Kang Nam 1 returned to North Korea without delivering her cargo to Burma.

In July 2009, the destroyer berthed at Yokohama's international passenger terminal on a goodwill tour. The ship was opened to the public on 22 July 2009.

=== 2010s ===
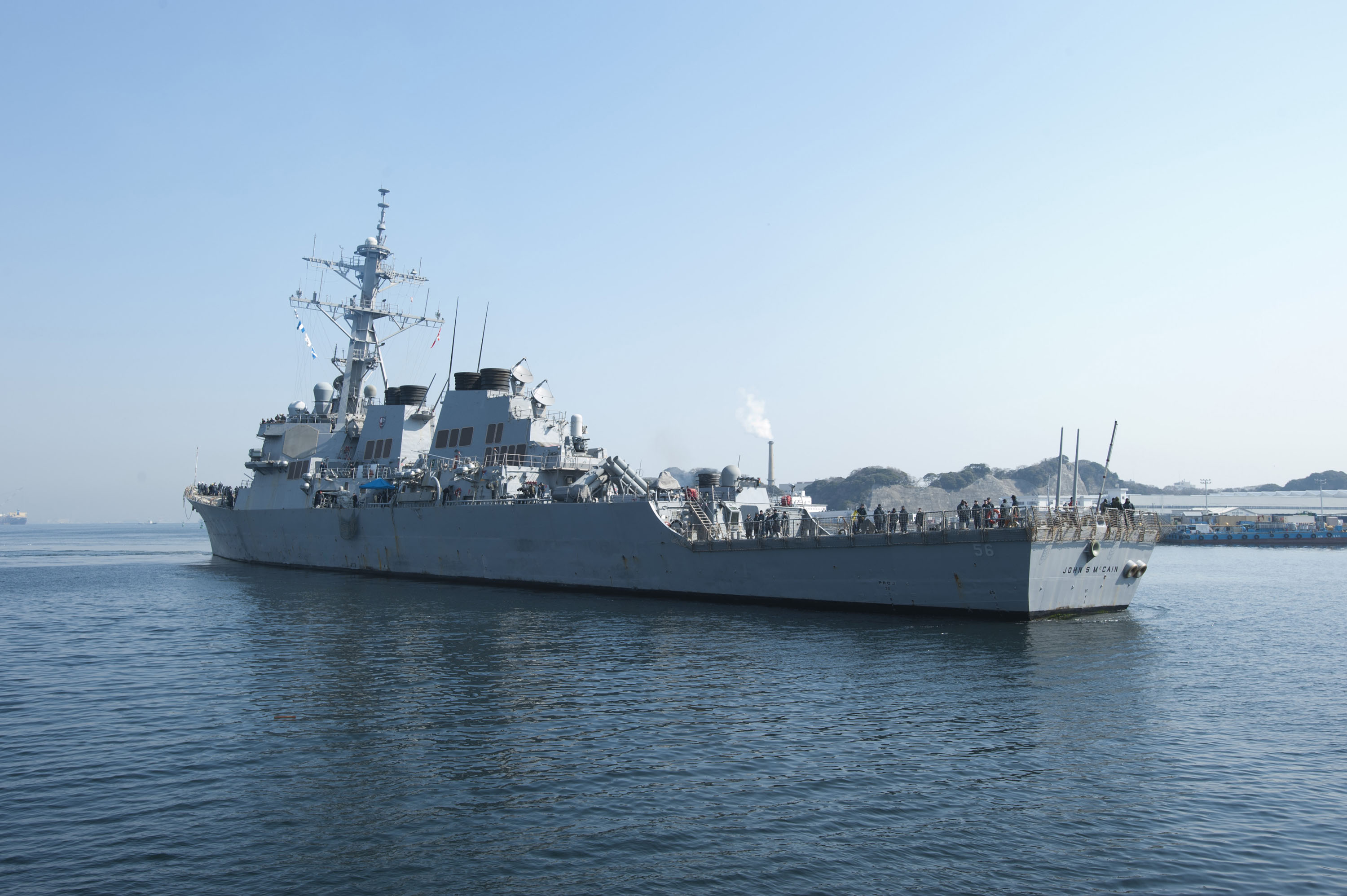
John S. McCain returns to Yokosuka Navy Base, shortly after participating in Operation Tomodachi, 29 March 2011

In March 2011, in company with the aircraft carrier Ronald Reagan, the ship was deployed off northeastern Honshu, Japan, to assist with relief efforts after the 2011 Tōhoku earthquake. During that time, the ship may have been exposed to leaking radiation from the Fukushima I nuclear accidents.

In April 2013, John S. McCain was sent to South Korea during escalating tensions between the Koreas. In June 2014, John S. McCain was sent to Subic Bay to perform in CARAT (Cooperation Afloat Readiness and Training) exercises.

On 2 October 2016, John S. McCain and USS Frank Cable made the first port visit by U.S. Navy ships to Cam Ranh Bay since end of the Vietnam War in 1975. In August 2017, John S. McCain sailed within 6 nautical miles (7 mi; 11 km) of Mischief Reef in the South China Sea, exercising a claim to freedom of navigation. China, claiming sovereignty over the reef, expressed its "strong dissatisfaction" in response to the action. A US Navy representative reported that a Chinese frigate had sent at least 10 radio messages warning that the John S. McCain was in Chinese waters, to which the US ship replied that it was "conducting routine operations in international waters."

=== 2017 MV Alnic MC collision ===
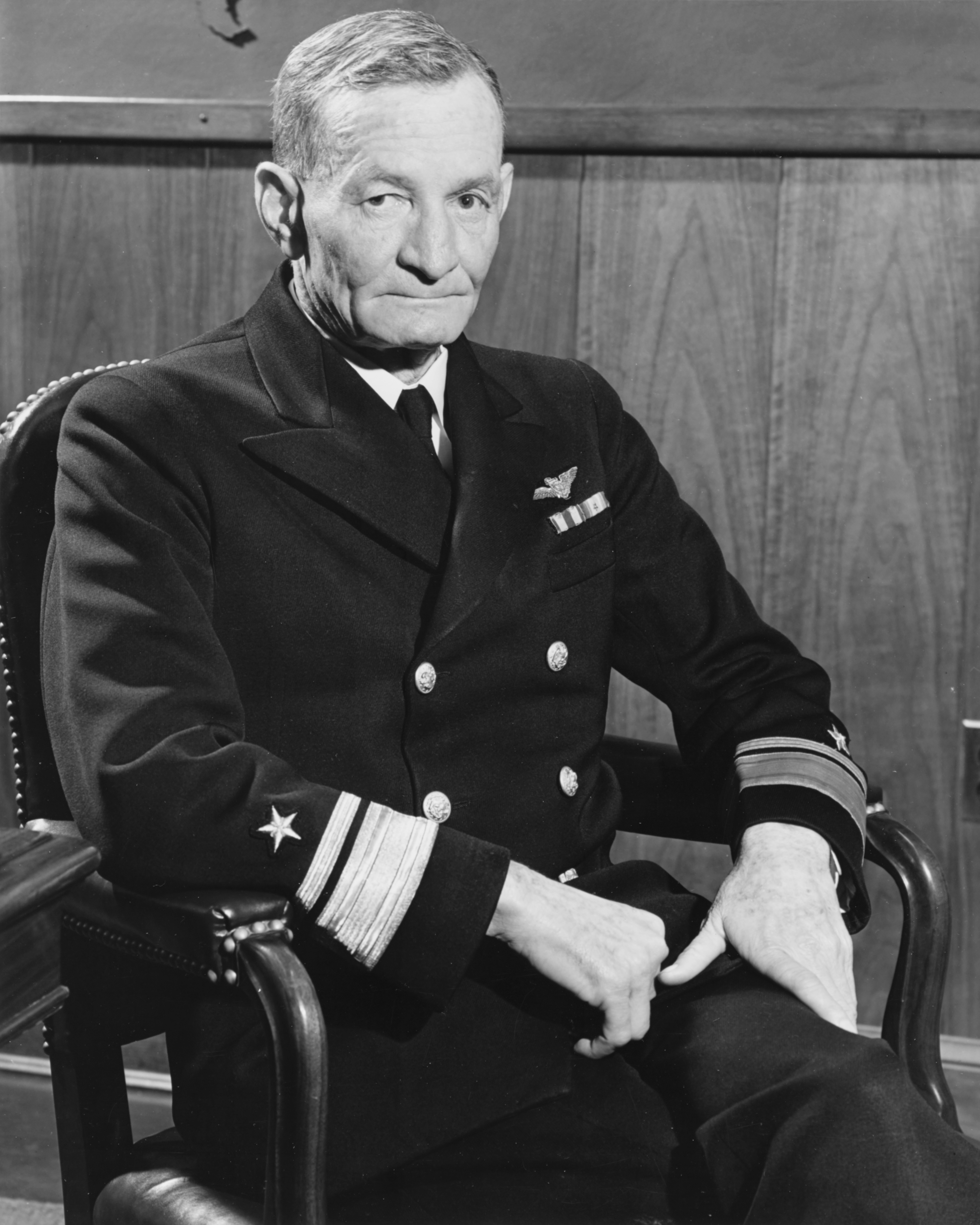
Vice-Admiral John S. McCain, ca. 1943. The senior namesake of the ship

At 5:24 am on 21 August 2017, John S. McCain was involved in a collision with the Liberian-flagged Alnic MC off the coast of Singapore and Malaysia, east of the Strait of Malacca. According to a United States Navy press release, the breach "resulted in flooding to nearby compartments, including crew berthing, machinery, and communications rooms." Ten US Navy sailors died as a result of the crash, which prompted the Maritime and Port Authority (MPA) of Singapore to start a multi-agency SAR effort as the agency responsible for coordinating air-sea rescue operations within Singapore's Maritime Search and Rescue Region (MSRR). The Singapore Transport Safety Bureau (TSIB) also launched a marine safety investigation following the collision in accordance with the International Maritime Organisation's Casualty Investigation Code in Singapore's capacity as a coastal state, and published its final report on 8 March 2018. The U.S. Navy announced on 24 August 2017 that it had suspended search-and-rescue efforts for survivors in the open sea to focus on the recovery of the remains of the missing sailors still inside the flooded compartments of the ship. By 27 August U.S. Navy and Marine Corps divers had recovered the remains of all 10 sailors. On 12 September 2017, the United States' chargé d'affaires Stephanie Syptak-Ramnath expressed thanks for Singapore's support during the SAR operations.

Throughout 2018, she was under repair in drydock and by November 2018, the ship left drydock and was transferred to a pier to continue her repairs. The repairs were completed in October 2019.

Investigation into the collision showed that an overly complex touchscreen system used for throttle control and training deficiencies had contributed to a loss of control of the ship just before it crossed paths with a merchant ship in the Singapore Strait, prompting a decision by the Navy to revert ships of this class to mechanical throttle controls fleetwide.

=== 2020s ===
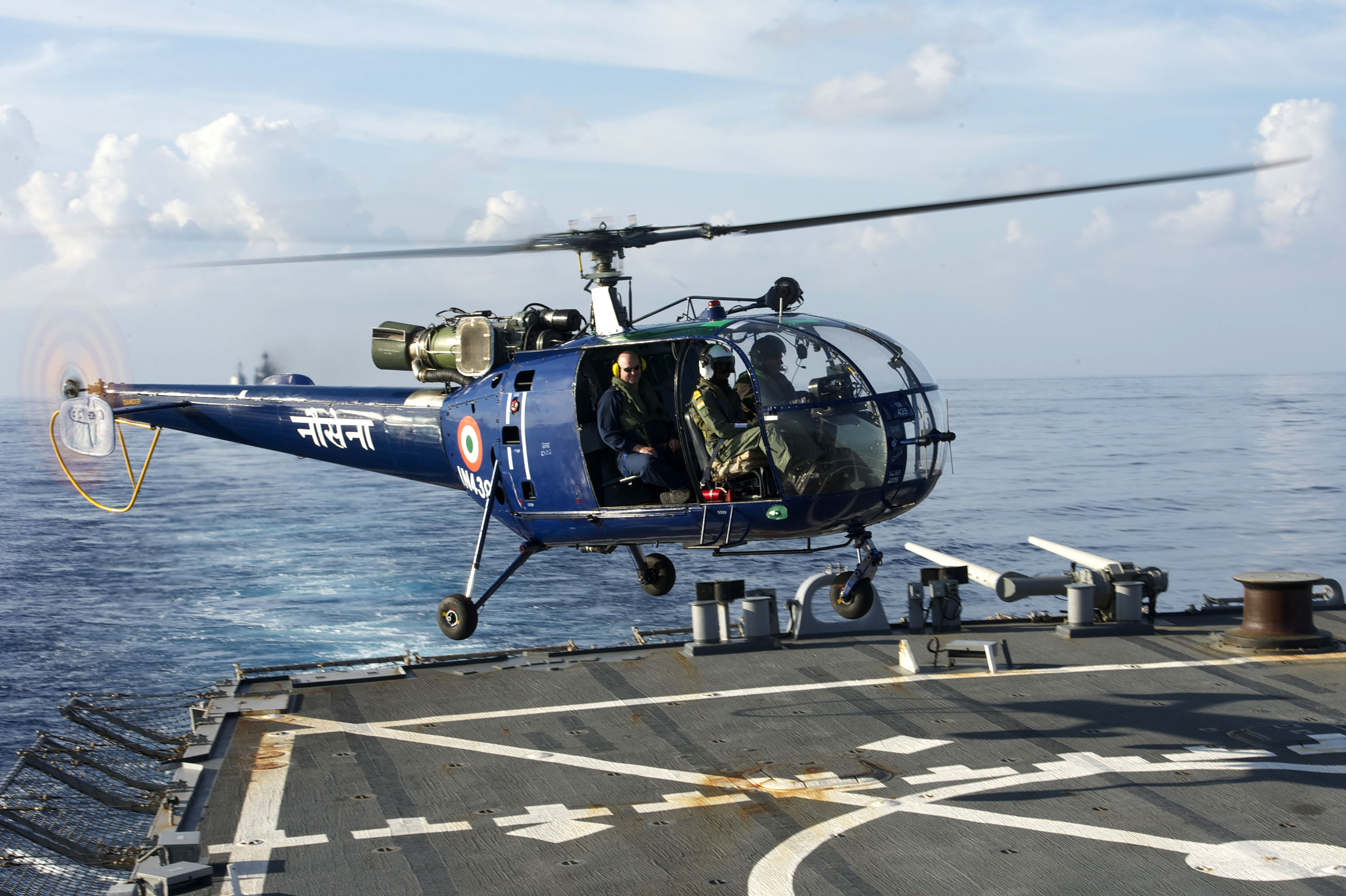
Indian Navy HAL Chetak landing on USS John S. McCain (DDG-56) in July 2014

While conducting a freedom of navigation operation in Peter the Great Bay, in the Sea of Japan on 24 November 2020, the Russian Navy destroyer Admiral Vinogradov demanded that John S. McCain leave the bay, which Russia claims as their territorial waters, or they would be "rammed". While Russian news agency TASS claims that the Russian Navy chased the US destroyer out of the bay, a spokesperson for the U.S. 7th Fleet claims that John S. McCain left bay of their own accord, after completing the exercise. The US further claims that they were in international waters at all times, which was the purpose of the exercise.

On 17 September 2021, John S. McCain departed her previous home port Yokosuka Naval Base in Yokosuka, Japan as part of a scheduled shift to her new homeport at Naval Station Everett in Everett, Washington with 24 years of forward deployed service.

On 6 August 2023, John S. McCain and three other destroyers responded to a joint Chinese-Russian patrol in international waters near Alaska. The Chinese-Russian flotilla left without incident.

On 4 September 2024, the US Navy relieved the captain of the John S. McCain of duty because of a loss of confidence in his ability to lead after a steering issue led to a near miss in the Middle East. Earlier a picture of the captain of John S. McCain firing a rifle, whose scope was mounted backwards, went viral on social media.

== Awards ==
- Navy Unit Commendation - (Oct 1997-Apr 1998)
- Navy Meritorious Unit Commendation - (2001, Apr 2012-Dec 2013)
- Battle "E" - (1998, 2000, 2003, 2004, 2006, 2010)
- CNO Afloat Safety Award (PACFLT) - (2006)
- Humanitarian Service Medal - (11-31 May 2011) 2011 Tōhoku earthquake
- James F. Chezek Memorial Gunnery Award - (2005)
