= Wunder =

Wunder (German for "miracle") may refer to:

== People ==
- Eduard Wunder (1800–1869), German philologist
- George Wunder (1912–1987), German cartoonist
- Herta Wunder (1913–1992), German swimmer
- Ingolf Wunder (born 1985), Austrian pianist
- Issy Wunder (born 2003), Canadian ice hockey player
- Klaus Wunder (1950–2024), German footballer
- Richard Wunder (born 1984), Liechtenstein bobsledder
- Wunder (gamer), Danish professional gamer

== Companies and product names ==
- Wunder-Baum, a brand of disposable air fresheners

== Music ==
- Wunder, a 2012 German-language album by Roger Whittaker
- "Wunder", a 2012 song by Andreas Bourani
- "Wunder", a 2024 song by Ayliva and Apache 207

== See also ==
- Wunderkind (disambiguation)
- Wunder Beach
