= Wunderkind (disambiguation) =

Wunderkind (from German: Wunderkind, literally "wonder child"), or child prodigy, is a child who produces meaningful output to the level of an adult expert performer.

Wunderkind may also refer to:

- Wunderkind (band), whose members formed November Group
- Wunderkind (fashion), a German fashion brand
- "Wunderkind" (song), by Alanis Morissette, 2005
- "The Wunderkind", an episode of the 2019 television series The Twilight Zone

== See also ==
- Wunder (disambiguation)
- Wonder Boy (disambiguation)
- Child genius (disambiguation)
- Boy Genius (disambiguation)
- Wunderkind Little Amadeus, a German animated TV series
