= John S. McCain Jr. =

United States Navy admiral (1911–1981)

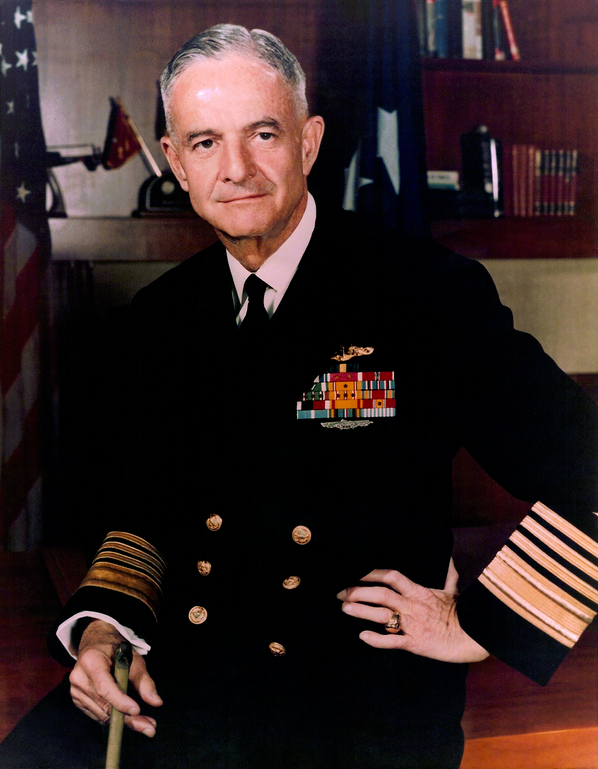
- Born: January 17, 1911; Council Bluffs, Iowa, U.S.
- Died: March 22, 1981 (aged 70); Over the North Atlantic
- Burial place: Arlington National Cemetery
- Spouse: Roberta Wright (m. 1933)
- Children: 3, including John and Joe
- Relatives: McCain family
- Military career
- Allegiance: United States
- Branch: United States Navy
- Service years: 1931–1972
- Rank: Admiral
- Nickname: Jack
- Commands: United States Pacific Command; United States Naval Forces Europe; Atlantic Reserve Fleet; Eastern Sea Frontier; Amphibious Forces, Atlantic Fleet; USS Albany (CA-123); Submarine Squadron 6 USS Dentuda (SS-335); USS Gunnel (SS-253)
- Conflicts: World War II; Korean War; Vietnam War
- Awards: Navy Distinguished Service Medal (2); Silver Star; Legion of Merit (3); Bronze Star Medal

John Sidney McCain Jr. (January 17, 1911 – March 22, 1981) was a United States Navy admiral who served in conflicts from the 1940s through the 1970s, including as the Commander, United States Pacific Command.

The son and namesake of a naval officer, McCain grew up in Washington, D.C., and graduated from the U.S. Naval Academy in 1931, after which he entered the submarine service. During World War II, he commanded submarines in several theaters of operation and was responsible for sinking several Japanese ships, eventually being decorated with both the Silver Star and Bronze Star. After the war, he held a variety of commands, specializing in amphibious warfare. He led the U.S. invasion of the Dominican Republic in 1965. He also served in several posts in Washington, including the Legislative Affairs Office and as Chief of Naval Information, where he became influential in political affairs. He was a staunch anti-Communist, and his advocacy of a strong naval presence earned him the nickname of "Mr. Seapower".

During the Vietnam War, McCain was Commander-in-Chief, Pacific Command (CINCPAC), commanding all U.S. forces in the Vietnam theater from 1968 to 1972. He was a stalwart supporter of President Richard Nixon's policy of Vietnamization. McCain played a significant role in the militarization of U.S. policy towards Cambodia, helping to convince Nixon to launch the 1970 Cambodian Incursion and establishing a personal relationship with Cambodian leader Lon Nol. McCain was also a proponent of the 1971 incursion into Laos. He retired from the Navy in 1972.

His father, Admiral John S. McCain Sr., was a naval aviator and Task Force commander during World War II. They were the first father-son pair to achieve a four-star rank. His son, John S. McCain III, was also a naval aviator who was a prisoner of war in North Vietnam during McCain's time as CINCPAC, and later became a United States Senator and the 2008 Republican presidential nominee.

== Early years, education, and family ==
McCain was born in Council Bluffs, Iowa, on January 17, 1911. His father, John S. McCain Sr., was a junior officer on the armored cruiser USS Washington and was away at sea at the time and his mother, the former Catherine Davey Vaulx, was traveling cross-country to visit with her sister. He was called "Jack" by his family, although he would also be called "Junior" by others, which he liked less. His family's history of military service extended beyond his father—his paternal uncle was U.S. Army Brigadier General William Alexander McCain. His family tree also contained other people engaged in military service, which extended back through many wars.

McCain grew up at various naval stations where his father was posted and then in Northwest, Washington, D.C., going to local schools and working as a paperboy. His father was away on duty for much of his childhood, and his mother did much of the parenting. He graduated from Central High School in the district.

McCain entered the United States Naval Academy in 1927, aged 16. He disliked the hazing tradition and behavioral restrictions of Annapolis and accumulated many demerits and earned mediocre grades during his years at the Academy. As one biographer wrote, McCain "was given to taking unauthorized midnight leave and spent much of his four ... years in contention with authority and working off massive doses of extra duty." McCain later stated: "I was known as a 'ratey' plebe, and that's the plebe who does not conform always to the specific rules and regulations of the upperclassmen. Some of these upperclassmen would ... require you to do such things which only incited rebellion and mutiny in me, see." At one point, McCain had so many demerits he was at risk of not graduating; his partying and drinking was especially dangerous as it was taking place during Prohibition. During much of his final year there he was banished from Bancroft Hall, the normal residence for midshipmen, and forced instead to live on the barracks ship Reina Mercedes. He graduated in 1931, finishing 423rd out of 441 in class rank, nineteenth from the bottom.

Upon graduation, he was commissioned an ensign and assigned to duty aboard the battleship Oklahoma in the Pacific. He applied to flight school to become a naval aviator, but was turned down due to a heart murmur, and was accepted at Submarine School at Naval Submarine Base New London in Connecticut instead. There, he placed 28th out of 29 in his class.

While stationed on Oklahoma in Long Beach, California, McCain met Roberta Wright, a freshman at the University of Southern California whose father was a successful wildcatter. After Roberta's mother objected to her daughter associating with a sailor, the couple eloped to Tijuana, Baja California, Mexico, marrying in Caesar's Bar on January 21, 1933. McCain was suspended five days for leaving ship without permission. The couple would have three children: Jean Alexandra "Sandy" McCain (1934−2019, born at Coco Solo Naval Air Station in the Panama Canal Zone); John Sidney McCain III (1936−2018, also born at Coco Solo Naval Air Station); and Joseph Pinckney McCain II (born 1942 at Naval Submarine Base New London).

The family was frequently uprooted as they followed McCain from New London to Pearl Harbor, Hawaii, and other stations in the Pacific Ocean; Roberta took on the lead role in raising the children. In 1934, McCain was praised for loyalty and for performing his duties very well, but his fitness report said he suffered from nervousness, and he was treated for weight loss at Pearl Harbor Naval Hospital. He served in the old, World War I-era submarines S-45 and R-13. From 1938 to 1940, he returned to the Naval Academy for a stint of teaching electrical engineering to midshipmen. He later said of this position, "The lads learned soon enough never to try to hoodwink an old hoodwinker." In 1940 and early 1941, he sailed in the more modern submarine USS Skipjack (SS-184) as part of the Pacific Fleet's SubDiv 15. In April 1941, McCain was detached to his first command, the antique USS O-8 (SS-69), recommissioned as a training boat at the Submarine School in New London.

== World War II ==
After the 1941 attack on Pearl Harbor, McCain would not see his family for long stretches. By then a lieutenant commander, McCain was assigned to command the submarine Gunnel, joining her in May 1942 for trials and seeing the boat commissioned in August 1942.

Gunnel was deployed as part of the November 1942 invasion of French North Africa. Operating conditions for the five submarines sent there were not favorable, due to overcrowded waters, poor weather, and mixed-up signals, and the deployment had no accomplishments. Like many other U.S. submarines, Gunnel was attacked in error by friendly aircraft. The Hooven-Owens-Rentschler (H.O.R.) diesels (known as "whores") which powered Gunnel were troublesome; at one point while returning home, drive gears of all four of the main engines were out of commission, and McCain's crew had to rely on their tiny auxiliary engine for the last 1,000 nautical miles (1,900 km). Gunnel went into the navy yard for an extensive refit and was replaced on patrol station off North Africa by "Pilly" Lent's Haddo.

After the refit, Gunnel was ordered to the Pacific Fleet, and in June 1943, went on patrol in the East China and Yellow Seas. On June 15, McCain torpedoed and sank the freighter Koyo Maru (6400 tons) in the Tsushima Strait. Early on June 19, he engaged a Japanese convoy that was headed for Shanghai. He torpedoed and sank the freighter Tokiwa Maru (7000 tons) and hit a smaller vessel. The convoy's escorts then staged a prolonged counter-attack on Gunnel, dropping depth charges that shook and damaged the boat and grappling hooks that rattled along its hull.

Underwater for hours, sometimes near the seabottom, McCain surfaced; Japanese escorts fired shells at him as he stood on the bridge, while he fired torpedoes back, striking and sinking one (originally thought to be a destroyer, it was the coastal minesweeper Tsubame). He dove again and the Japanese ships continued in sonar-based pursuit. After a total of 36 hours, nearly all spent underwater, Gunnel's batteries were about to fail and the air was very hot and virtually unbreathable. McCain surfaced in battle stations position, ready to engage in a disadvantageous gun battle with the Japanese pursuers, but they were heading in the opposite direction and he was able to escape.

Persistent trouble from the submarine's diesel engines then cut short the patrol after only eleven days, after which McCain returned to Pearl Harbor. Despite the reduced time, the freighter tonnage Gunnel sunk was the second-largest total for any of the sixteen U.S. submarines deployed into operational areas in the Pacific that month.

McCain was awarded the Silver Star for this patrol, for "conspicuous gallantry and intrepidity in action, as Commanding Officer of a submarine in enemy Japanese-controlled waters ... [and] bravery under fire and aggressive fighting spirit." McCain's personality was a good fit for wartime submarine duty. Many of the U.S. submarine commanders trained in peacetime had focused excessively on conformance to regulations and adherence to official tactical doctrine; they lacked the aggressiveness and ability to improvise that the conflict in the Pacific demanded, and by the end of the first year of the war, almost a third of them had been relieved as inadequate.

Gunnel was the first Pearl Harbor boat to have her H.O.R. diesels replaced, and she returned to action off Iwo Jima in December 1943. Alerted by Station HYPO intelligence to the presence of aircraft carriers, on the night of December 2–3, McCain fired four torpedoes at Japanese carrier Zuihō at a very long range of 6,000 yards (5,500 m), only to miss as Zuihō zigged. Although he did not hit it, McCain was one of only a handful of U.S. submarine commanders to actually attack an enemy carrier. Gunnel did sink one ship of 4000 tons during this patrol.

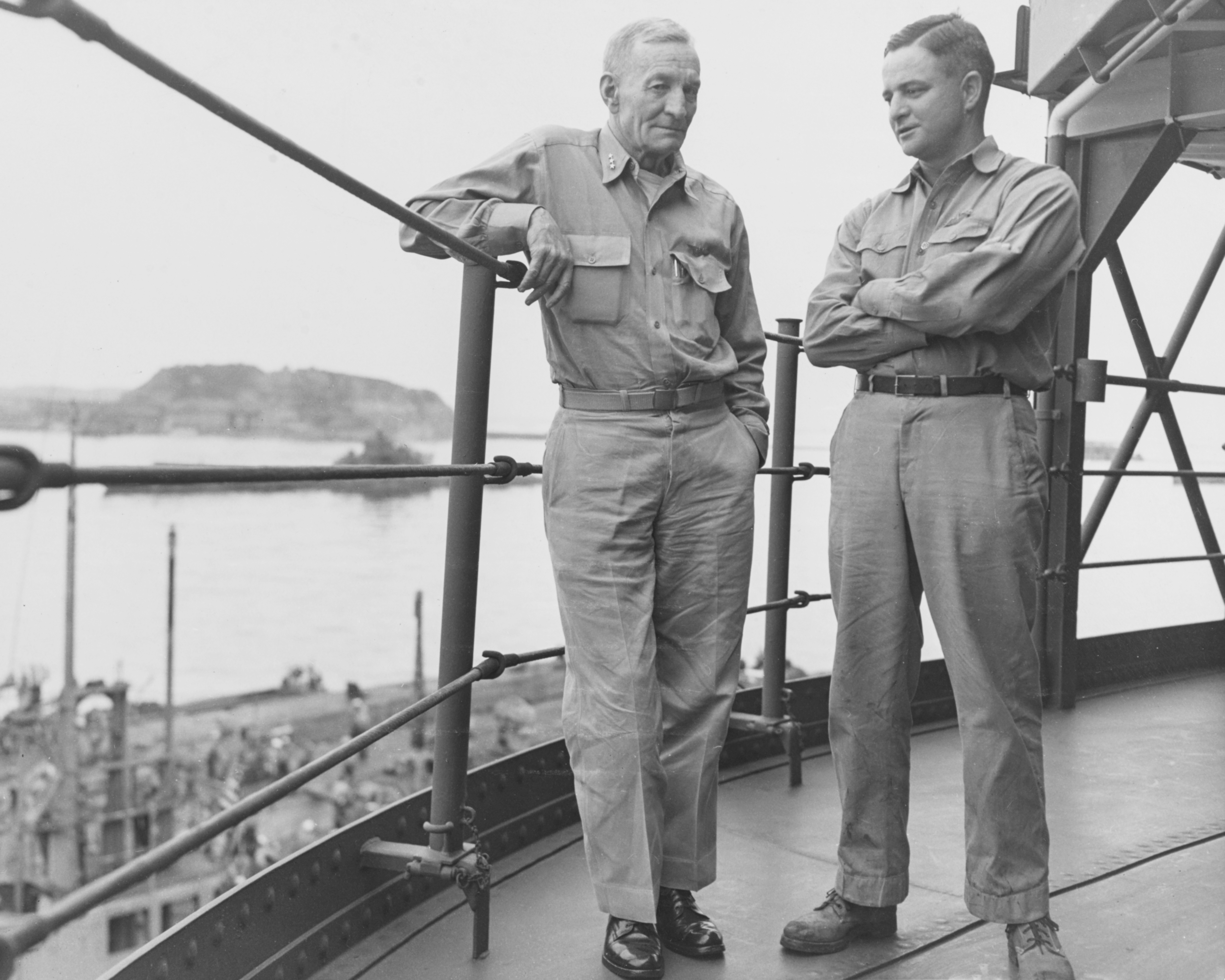
"Jack" McCain alongside his father, Admiral John S. "Slew" McCain Sr., on board a U.S. Navy ship in Tokyo Bay, September 2, 1945

On March 18, 1944, on patrol off Tawi Tawi, the main Japanese fleet anchorage in the Philippines, McCain got another shot at a carrier. He fired from extremely long range 9,000 yards (8,200 m), missed the target, and sustained a counterattack of sixteen depth charges. He tried to attack the same carrier over the next four days, but could place his boat no closer than 5 nautical miles (9.3 km).

During the May 1944 joint American and British Operation Transom air strike on Surabaya, Gunnel lay off Tawi Tawi in company with Robert I. Olsen's Angler, but McCain managed no attacks on Japanese ships. He shifted his operations to the coast of Indochina, where, on June 8, he picked up a convoy, escorted by yet another aircraft carrier. He was unable to approach closer than 15 nautical miles (28 km). In July 1944, he was detached for a brief return to New London.

On his return to Pearl Harbor, the Navy ordered him to command the new Dentuda starting October 1944, with commissioning two months later. Now a commander, during his one patrol with that submarine he damaged a large freighter and sank two guard boat-style patrol craft in the East China Sea and the Taiwan Straits. For this action, McCain was awarded the Bronze Star Medal with Combat V.

At the conclusion of the war, McCain sailed Dentuda into Tokyo Bay and had one last meeting with his father, who had been commanding the Fast Carrier Task Force during the latter stages of the war. Slew McCain died four days after the Japanese surrender ceremony in Tokyo Bay.

In addition to his Silver and Bronze Stars, McCain's actions in the war earned him two letters of commendation. A superior wrote that: "His zeal in the investigation and development of new submarine tactics and weapons has been outstanding."

== "Mr. Seapower" ==
Right to left: McCain in 1951, with his son Joe, wife Roberta, and son John

After the end of the war, McCain remained in the Navy and his family settled in Northern Virginia. He was assigned as Director of Records to the Bureau of Naval Personnel until early 1949. McCain published a January 1949 article in United States Naval Institute Proceedings examining the training challenges the Navy faced in the nuclear era. He assumed command of Submarine Division 71 in the Pacific that year, with his flag in Carp, which took him to a variety of naval stations and two exploratory cruises to extreme northern waters, adding to the knowledge of an increasingly important strategic area for submarine operations.

From February through November 1950, McCain was executive officer of the heavy cruiser Saint Paul, and from June 1950 was involved in the early stages of the Korean War, joining Task Force 77 to patrol the Formosa Strait.

Now a captain, McCain was assigned to a series of posts at the Pentagon in alternation with various commands. He was director of Undersea Warfare Research and Development from 1950 to 1953, commander of Submarine Squadron 6 aboard flagship Sea Leopard in the Atlantic from 1953 to 1954, commander of the attack transport Monrovia from 1954 to 1955 in the Mediterranean, Director of the Progress Analysis Group from 1955 to 1957, and commander of the heavy cruiser Albany from 1957 to 1958. During these years, McCain went to the Naval Academy a number of times to admonish his son John on his performance there, which was at least as troublesome as his own had been. As one biographical profile stated, "Few fathers and sons could have been more alike as adolescents than Jack McCain and John Sidney III: Youthful rebellion seemed encoded in their DNA."

McCain was promoted to rear admiral in November 1958. From 1958 to 1960, he was assigned to the Office of the Secretary of the Navy, where he joined the Legislative Affairs Office as Chief Legislative Liaison. There he formed many useful political connections, as senators, representatives, admirals, and generals were all frequent social visitors to his centrally located D.C. house, which would later become the Capitol Hill Club. McCain was also a member of the Cosmos Club, Army and Navy Club, and the Chevy Chase Club, all in the D.C. area, and was a 33rd degree mason. His wife Roberta, viewed as "charming" and "wonderful" by McCain's superiors, also aided the social success, which featured as house guests powerful Congressional figures such as Carl Vinson, Richard Russell Jr., and Everett Dirksen. (His son John would witness some of these and earlier interactions and two decades later assume the same role, on way to the start of his political career.) During this stint, Rear Admiral McCain became an effective advocate for the Navy in congressional hearings and behind-the-scenes dealmaking, and helped persuade Congress to restore budget allocations it had earlier cut from construction programs for aircraft carriers.

Vice Admiral McCain, c. 1964 when he was Commander Amphibious Forces, U.S. Atlantic Fleet

From 1960 to 1962, McCain held commands in the Atlantic, including Amphibious Group 2 and Amphibious Training, and served on Taconic and Mount McKinley. He was Chief of Naval Information from 1962 to 1963, initiating the post and garnering influence with the Washington press that would aid his career. Following the April 1963 loss of the nuclear submarine Thresher, he explained to the public why the search for the wreckage would be lengthy and difficult, and defended the Navy against charges that it had been tardy in disclosing details of the disaster. McCain was promoted to vice admiral in July 1963, and was made commander of the entire Amphibious Forces, Atlantic Fleet (COMPHIBLANT). He came up with the idea for Operation Sea Orbit, the voyage around the world without refuelling of three nuclear-powered Navy ships; it was reminiscent of the Great White Fleet circumnavigation that his father had been part of over half a century earlier. Later in 1964, McCain commanded the Operation Steel Pike exercise off the coast of Spain, which was the largest amphibious landing ever in peacetime; he was awarded by a gold star in lieu of a Legion of Merit for this operation. After the operation he defended the performance of the United States Merchant Marine before the House Committee on Merchant Marine and Fisheries, and became a prominent public advocate for the geostrategic importance of the merchant marine.

In 1964 McCain was elected as an hereditary member of the Virginia Society of the Cincinnati by right of his descent from his great(4) grandfather Captain John Young who served with the Virginia State Troops during the American Revolution.

In April 1965, McCain led the United States invasion of the Dominican Republic as commander of Task Force 124, which maintained a military occupation until civil unrest had ended. McCain later said, "Some people condemned this as an 'unwarranted intervention,' but the Communists were all set to move in and take over. People may not love you for being strong when you have to be, but they respect you for it and learn to behave themselves when you are." He also worked closely with U.S. Ambassador to the Organization of American States Ellsworth Bunker, who was handling negotiations between local factions. For this operation, McCain was awarded the Legion of Merit.

McCain then served three roles simultaneously: vice chairman of delegation to the United Nations Military Staff Committee, Commander Eastern Sea Frontier, and Commander Atlantic Reserve Fleet. The U.N. post was considered to be a career dead-end, but McCain looked to his political contacts to keep his career going.

Throughout much of his career, McCain was known for his short and thin stature, salty character, and trademark cigar. One superior wrote that: "There is only one Jack McCain! Vice Admiral McCain, by his enthusiasm, honesty and delightful personality makes many friends, not only officially but socially.... The 'little man with the big cigar' is known to everyone." McCain liked to confer with enlisted men and get their opinions. He swore so much he earned the sobriquet "Good Goddamn McCain"; his regular greeting to begin the day was "Good goddamn morning." He was often asked how he told his wife Roberta and her identical twin sister Rowena apart, to which he famously responded by puffing his cigar, flashing a grin, and saying, "That's their problem." He jumped rope 200 times a day as part of keeping fit. He developed a problem with alcoholism during his career, and cut back on his drinking so that it did not interfere with his ability to command or show up on fitness reports, although he occasionally suffered lapses.

McCain was a staunch promoter of the importance of a strong naval presence, and indeed became known in military-congressional circles, sometimes not approvingly, as "Mr. Seapower". He gave regular speeches on the subject with an increasing fervor, and worked with his large number of political contacts in what some saw as an effort to get a final promotion. During the Cold War, McCain stressed the importance of maintaining naval superiority over the Soviet Union. He was especially concerned in light of the growing number of submarines deployed by the Soviet Navy, calling them "a direct threat to our free use of the oceans of the world." During a long U.S. policy debate regarding the merchant marine force, he continued to stress the importance of that fleet, giving an illustrated talk entitled "Total Wet War" that said the Soviets would soon overtake the fleet in numbers and concluding that "our free use of the seas will play an ever increasing role in the world situation of the future."

Beginning in 1965, Senate Minority Leader Dirksen had been championing McCain's case for four-star admiral promotion to President Lyndon Johnson. McCain had both supporters and detractors within the Navy, but the top commanders had sidetracked him with the U.N. appointment, and U.S. Secretary of Defense Robert McNamara had been given the impression that McCain was not a strong commander. Johnson was in debt to Dirksen for having broken the filibuster of the Civil Rights Act of 1964, and so in 1966, Johnson requested that McNamara find a four-star path for McCain.

== Vietnam War ==
In February 1967, McCain received his sought-after promotion to full admiral (which became effective in May), and became Commander-in-Chief, U.S. Naval Forces, Europe (CINCUSNAVEUR), stationed in London. At the change of command ceremony for the Eastern Sea Frontier post, held on his father's old flagship USS Wasp, McCain was awarded a gold star in lieu of a third Legion of Merit for his work during the U.N. assignment. As the Vietnam War escalated, McCain was a strong advocate for bringing Iowa-class battleships out of the United States Navy reserve fleets in order to support shore bombardment missions. He ordered a Naval Court of Inquiry to be convened following the June 1967 USS Liberty incident, and chose his colleague, Admiral Isaac C. Kidd Jr., to head it. McCain limited the scope of the Inquiry and gave Kidd only a week to investigate and come up with a report on the matter, factors that led to doubts persisting for decades about what actually took place in the Liberty attack.

McCain's son, naval aviator Lieutenant Commander John S. McCain III, became a prisoner of war in North Vietnam in October 1967, after being shot down and badly injured during a bombing raid over Hanoi. McCain's prominence made the downing of his son front-page news. McCain and his wife Roberta treated the news stoically, attending a dinner party in London without indicating anything was wrong, even though initial word indicated their son was unlikely to have survived the shoot-down. McCain would later say little about his son's captivity in public, other than that they had indications he was alive and "that is something to live for."

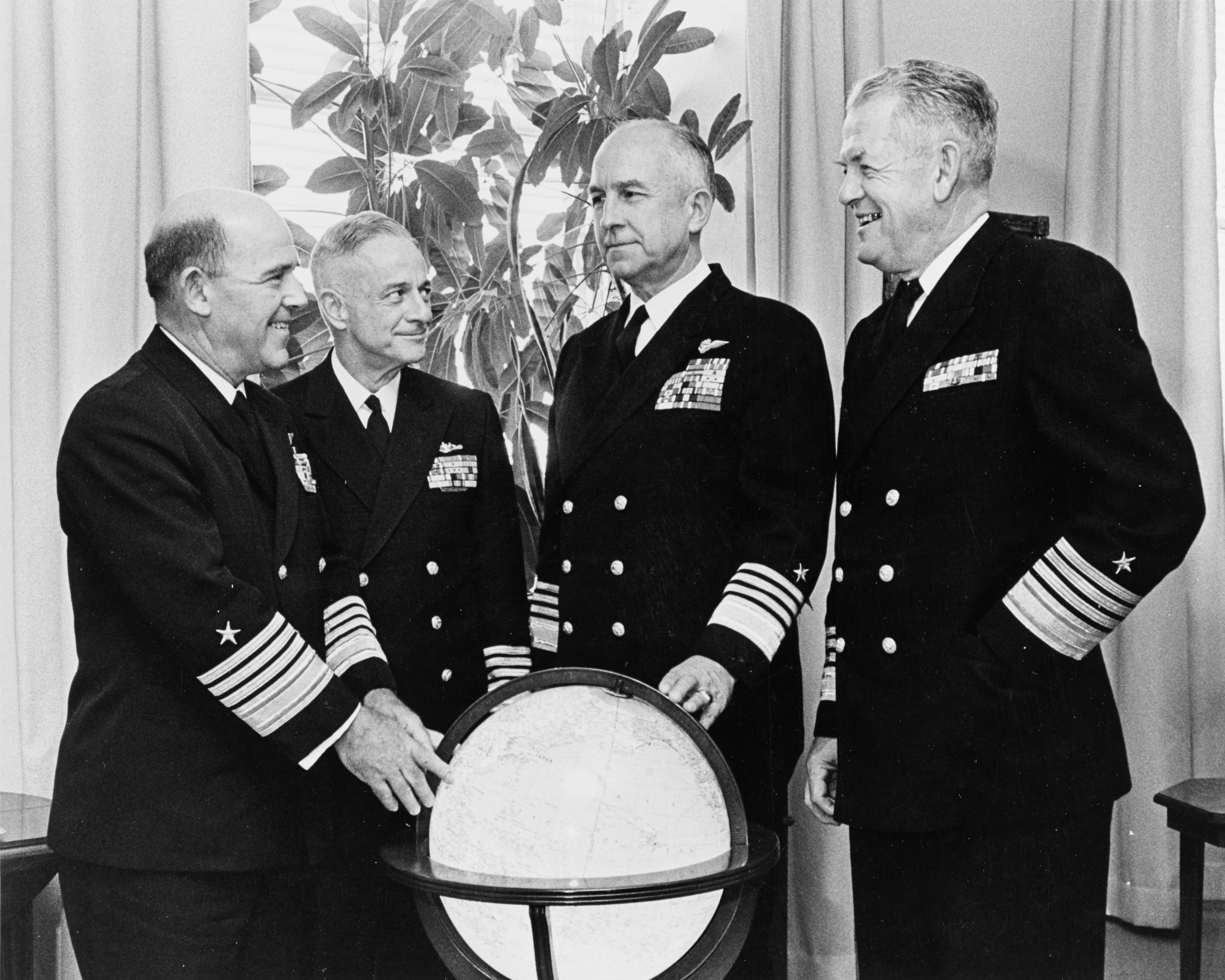
Senior U.S. Navy commanders pose around an illuminated globe in 1968: Admirals John J. Hyland, McCain, Chief of Naval Operations Thomas H. Moorer, and Ephraim P. Holmes.

McCain continued to expand on his vision of the Soviet threat, saying that the Soviets' maritime goal "encompasses not only the military uses of the sea, but also those relating to world politics, economics, commerce and technology", and likened its propaganda value to the Space Race. In April 1968, at the height of the Vietnam War, McCain was named by President Johnson as Commander-in-Chief, Pacific Command (CINCPAC), effective in July 1968, stationed in Honolulu and commander of all U.S. forces in the Vietnam theater. In an unprecedented move, Johnson had considered candidates from outside the Navy, including U.S. Army General William Westmoreland, who was leaving as commander of Military Assistance Command, Vietnam (MACV). However, the strong recommendation of Ellsworth Bunker, who had since become U.S. Ambassador to South Vietnam, was key in Johnson's decision. At the change-of-command ceremony for the Europe post, McCain was awarded the Navy Distinguished Service Medal.

McCain was a strong believer in the domino theory, and as CINCPAC, emphasized what he saw as the grave threat of Communist Chinese expansion of influence. He became well known within the Pentagon and to the press for his fervent briefings on the "Chicom" menace, showing maps with bright-red claws or arrows extending from a bright-red China into much of the area he was responsible for. To some, McCain was the Navy's most persuasive and energetic briefer, while to others, he was over-the-top and spoke longer than necessary. McCain believed the Pacific Command's role was both to confront the major Communist powers with superior and mobile force, and to provide a deterrent force to protect smaller countries from "aggression, whether this be overtly military or by subversion and infiltration."

When the Nixon Administration took office in January 1969, the secret National Security Study Memorandum 1 collected views of top officials on the prospects for President Richard Nixon's policy of Vietnamization. There was a division of thought among those contributing, but McCain was one of those who were relatively optimistic, believing the North Vietnamese had entered peace talks due to military weakness, South Vietnamese pacification progress was real, and the tide of the war was favorably turning. McCain suffered a mild stroke around this time, but was back at work a month later. Following an inspection tour of South Vietnam in December 1969, McCain remained very optimistic about the course of the war and the ability of South Vietnamese forces to carry greater burdens. McCain did not give much credence to the anti-Vietnam War movement; in reaction to the popular slogan "Make love, not war", he told a 1970 Naval Academy class that they were part of a fraternity "whose members are men enough to do both."

McCain played an important part in the expansion of U.S. involvement in Cambodia. In April 1970, McCain gave personal briefings to Nixon in Honolulu, and to Nixon and National Security Advisor Henry Kissinger in San Clemente, where he highlighted the threat from North Vietnamese operations in Cambodia and Laos. In particular, he said that Lon Nol's government in Cambodia would soon collapse unless North Vietnamese operations there were stopped, and that with a secure base there, North Vietnam could then launch attacks on South Vietnam which would cause the failure of Vietnamization. McCain additionally said that the schedule for the ongoing withdrawal of U.S. ground forces from Vietnam had to be flexible. McCain's views, which had the support of his subordinate, MACV commander General Creighton Abrams, helped persuade Nixon to go ahead with the Cambodian Incursion later that month. Kissinger subsequently told another admiral, "We have to be careful about having McCain around the president too much, because he fires up the president."

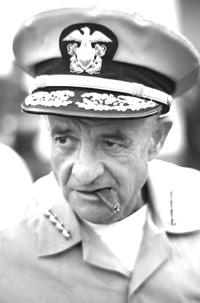
McCain following promotion to Full Admiral

By late 1970, McCain worried that Kissinger's plan for extensive commitment of South Vietnamese troops to preserve the Cambodian regime would endanger the progress of Vietnamization. Nevertheless, McCain was involved in the intense U.S. effort to prop up Cambodian leader Lon Nol, paying visits to Phnom Penh to give him assurances and assess the state of the Cambodians. When Lon Nol suffered a stroke in early 1971, he recuperated at McCain's guesthouse in Honolulu. At the same time, a Military Equipment Delivery Team program was organized to supply military assistance to the Cambodian government. McCain gained control of this effort (instead of Military Assistance Command, Vietnam), and to support a conflict that he proprietarily spoke of as "my war", made constant requests to the Pentagon for more arms and staff. He forced an Americanization of many logistics procedures within the Cambodian military. He sided with Kissinger and the Joint Chiefs of Staff as they prevailed over the U.S. Embassy in Cambodia and U.S. Defense Secretary Melvin Laird in adopting a militarization of American policy with regard to that country. Lon Nol's gratitude towards McCain continued, including the gift of an elephant (soon named "Cincpachyderm") too large to transport on McCain's DC-6.

McCain was also very concerned about the North Vietnamese presence in Laos. He was a proponent of Operation Lam Son 719, the February–March 1971 U.S.-assisted incursion into southeastern Laos by the South Vietnamese Army. He told Admiral Thomas Moorer, chairman of the Joint Chiefs, that an offensive against the Ho Chi Minh trail might compel Prince Souvanna Phouma, prime minister of Laos, "to abandon the guise of neutrality and enter the war openly." The operation ended in failure.

Each year while Jack McCain was CINCPAC, he paid a Christmastime visit to the American troops in South Vietnam serving closest to the DMZ; he would stand alone and look north, to be as close to his son as he could get. During Operation Linebacker, the resumed bombing of the north starting in April 1972, the targets included the Hanoi area. The daily orders were issued by McCain, knowing his imprisoned son was in the vicinity.

In March 1972, the Nixon administration announced Admiral Noel Gayler as McCain's successor as CINCPAC, despite McCain's unheeded request to Nixon to have his tour extended so that he could see the war to its conclusion. McCain's time as CINCPAC ended on September 1, 1972; at the transfer of command ceremony in Honolulu that day, Nixon focused on the contributions of the three generations of McCains – saying, "In the story of the McCains we see the greatness of America" – and awarded McCain a gold star in lieu of his second Navy Distinguished Service Medal. For the next two months, McCain served as special assistant to Chief of Naval Operations Admiral Elmo R. Zumwalt Jr. Kissinger would later characterize McCain's approach to the Vietnam War by saying, "He fought for the victory that his instinct and upbringing demanded and that political reality forbade."

== Retirement and death ==
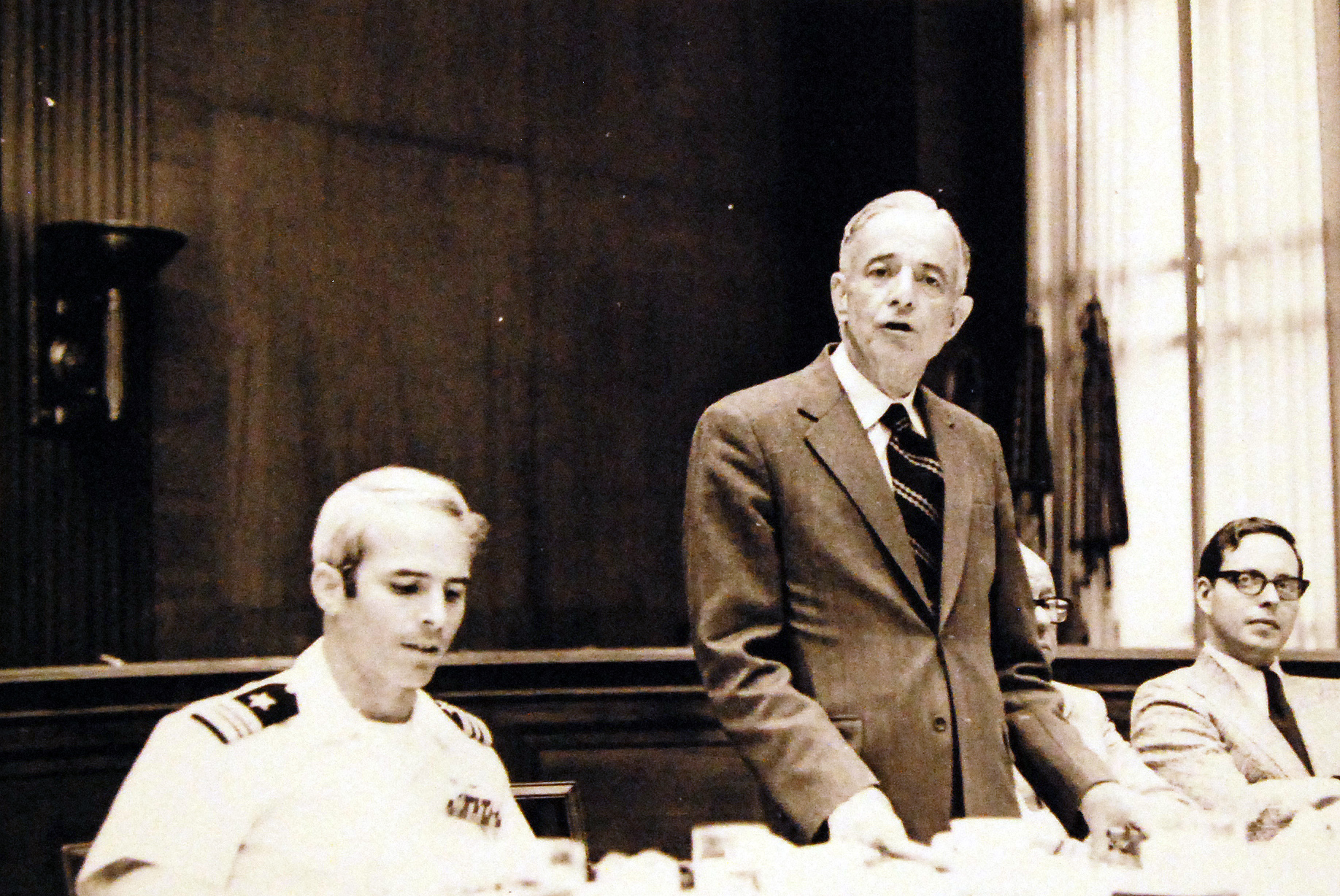
Admiral McCain, alongside his son John (on left), speaking at a May 1973 event on Capitol Hill honoring the returned POWs

McCain retired on November 1, 1972. There was no ceremony, as it would have been redundant after the one that took place two months earlier in Hawaii; as one associate said, "He just didn't come to work today."

In early 1973, with the conclusion of the Paris Peace Accords, his son was released from confinement as a prisoner of war in North Vietnam and repatriated to the United States.

McCain visited the White House in 1975 and discussed naval preparedness issues with President Gerald Ford. During the late 1970s, McCain sometimes acted as an advisor on military matters to Ronald Reagan, who was preparing for his second presidential candidacy. McCain also participated in a January 1978 traveling "Panama Canal Truth Squad", led by Senator Paul Laxalt, that sought Senate rejection of the Panama Canal Treaty; McCain felt that the eventual ceding of the canal to Panamanian control would endanger U.S. security and provide an opening to the Soviets in the region.

However, McCain felt despair over his reluctant retirement from the United States Navy, and fell into prolonged poor health. His son John felt his father's "long years of binge drinking" had caught up with him, despite a mostly successful later recovery in Alcoholics Anonymous.

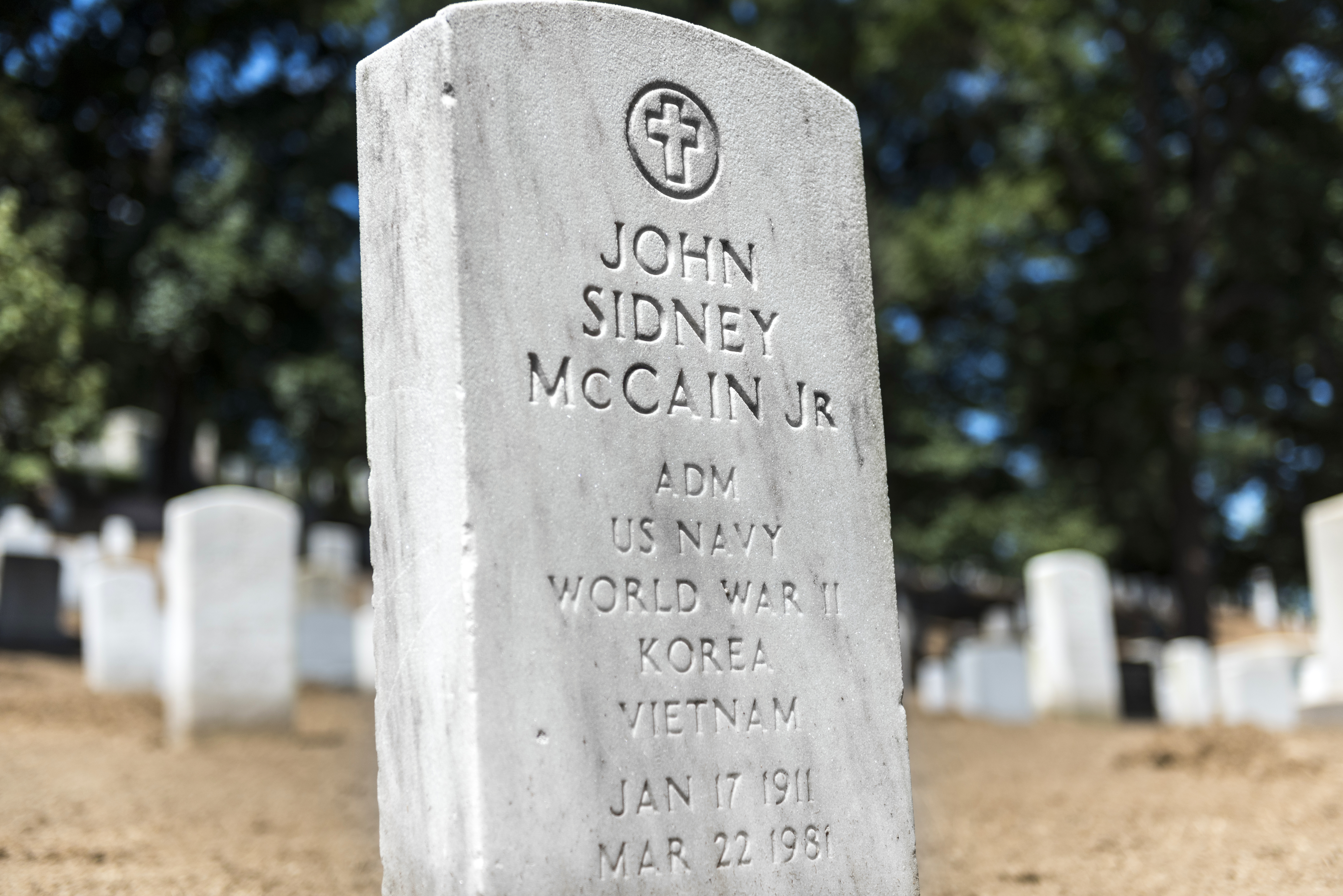
Gravestone at Arlington National Cemetery

McCain died of a heart attack on a military aircraft en route from Europe on March 22, 1981, with his wife at his side. He was buried at Arlington National Cemetery on March 27, 1981.

== Namesakes ==
USS John S. McCain (DDG-56) was named for both Admirals McCain. The Navy rededicated the ship to also honor Senator John S. McCain III in 2018.

McCain was written about extensively in his son John's 1999 memoir Faith of My Fathers. McCain was portrayed by actor Scott Glenn in the 2005 television movie adaptation.

Grandson John S. "Jack" McCain IV attended and graduated from the United States Naval Academy in 2009, the fourth-generation John S. McCain to do so. He became a naval aviator, like his father and great-grandfather, including flying helicopters during the War in Afghanistan. John S. McCain IV has a son John S. "Mac" McCain V.

== Awards ==
By the end of his career, Admiral John S. McCain Jr. had received the following medals and decorations:

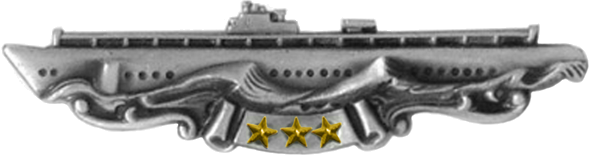

Submarine Warfare insignia
Navy Distinguished Service Medal with one star	Silver Star	Legion of Merit with two stars
Bronze Star with Combat "V"	Navy Commendation Medal with Combat "V"	China Service Medal
American Defense Service Medal with "FLEET" clasp	American Campaign Medal	European-African-Middle; Eastern Campaign Medal with one battle star
Asiatic-Pacific Campaign Medal with four battle stars	World War II Victory Medal	Navy Occupation Service Medal with "ASIA" clasp
National Defense Service Medal with one star	Korean Service Medal	Armed Forces Expeditionary Medal
Vietnam Service Medal with three stars	Legion of Honor (Philippines)	Order of National Security Merit, 1st Class (South Korea)
United Nations Korea Medal	Vietnam Campaign Medal	Korean War Service Medal
Submarine Combat Patrol insignia

== Writings ==
- McCain, John S. Jr. (January 1949). "Where Do We Go from Here?". Proceedings. 75 (1). United States Naval Institute: 47–52.
- McCain, John S. Jr. (January 1963). "Amphibious Warfare During the Next Decade". Proceedings. 89 (1). United States Naval Institute: 104–111.
- McCain, John S. Jr. (November 1, 1963). "New Four Ocean Challenge". Vital Speeches of the Day.
- McCain, John S. Jr. (1964). The New Four Ocean Challenge. Washington, D.C.: Department of the Navy, Bureau of Naval Personnel, Office of the Special Assistant for Leadership Development.
- McCain, John S. Jr. (June 15, 1966). "Total Wet War". Vital Speeches of the Day.
- McCain, John S. Jr. (1967). The Expanding Scope of Sea Power. Washington, D.C.: Department of the Navy, Bureau of Naval Personnel.
- McCain, John, ed. (1999). The Reminiscences of Admiral John S. McCain Jr., U.S. Navy (Retired). Annapolis, MD: Naval Institute Press. LCCN 00267356. OCLC 50234750. ASIN B0006RY8ZK.

== See also ==
- List of United States Navy four-star admirals

== Bibliography ==
- Alexander, Paul (2002). Man of the People: The Life of John McCain. Hoboken, New Jersey: John Wiley & Sons. ISBN 0-471-22829-X.
- Blair, Clay Jr. (2001) [1975]. Silent Victory: The U.S. Submarine War Against Japan (Reprint ed.). Annapolis, Maryland: Naval Institute Press. ISBN 1-55750-217-X.
- Cressman, Robert (2000). The Official Chronology of the U.S. Navy in World War II. Naval Institute Press. ISBN 1-55750-149-1.
- Kissinger, Henry (2003). Ending the Vietnam War: A History of America's Involvement in and Extrication from the Vietnam War. Simon & Schuster. ISBN 0-7432-1532-X.
- McCain, John; Salter, Mark (1999). Faith of My Fathers. New York: Random House. ISBN 0-375-50191-6.
- McCain, John; Salter, Mark (2002). Worth the Fighting For. New York: Random House. ISBN 0-375-50542-3.
- Moritz, Charles, ed. (1971). Current Biography Yearbook 1970. H. W. Wilson Company.
- Reeves, Richard (2001). President Nixon: Alone in the White House. New York: Simon & Schuster. ISBN 0-7432-2719-0.
- Reynolds, Clark G. (2002). Famous American Admirals. Naval Institute Press. ISBN 1-55750-006-1.
- Rohwer, J.; Hümmelchen, G. (1974). Chronology of the War at Sea, 1939–1945. Vol. 2. Translated by Masters, Derek. Arco Publishing Co. ISBN 0-668-03401-7.
- Shawcross, William (1979). Sideshow: Kissinger, Nixon, and the Destruction of Cambodia (paperback). Pocket Books. ISBN 0-671-83525-4.
- Timberg, Robert (1996). The Nightingale's Song. New York: Simon & Schuster. ISBN 0-684-80301-1. Online access to a portion of Chapter 1 is available.
- Timberg, Robert (1999). John McCain: An American Odyssey. New York: Touchstone Books. ISBN 0-684-86794-X. Online access to Chapter 1 is available.
