= Boy Genius =

A boy genius is a male child prodigy.

Boy Genius may refer to:

- Jimmy Neutron: Boy Genius, a 2001 American animated film
- boygenius, an American music group
  - boygenius (EP), the group's 2018 debut EP
- Boy Genius, a novel by Yongsoo Park
- "Boy Genius", a song by Kwamé from the 1989 album Kwamé the Boy Genius: Featuring a New Beginning
- "Boy Genius", song by Michael Beltrami from The Omen (2006 film) soundtrack
- "Boy Genius", song by Reverend Zen from the 2006 album Angels, Blues & the Crying Moon
- Boy Genius, a performing name of Brandon Boyer (born 1977)

== See also ==
- Genius (disambiguation)
- Child genius (disambiguation)
- Wunderkind (disambiguation)
- Boy Genius Report, a website
- The Adventures of Barry Ween, Boy Genius, a comic book by Judd Wynick
- The Boy Genius and the Mogul: The Untold Story of Television, a book by Daniel Stashower
- Girl Genius, a comic book
