= Wonder Man (disambiguation) =

Wonder Man is a Marvel comic book superhero.

Wonder Man or Wonderman may also refer to:

== Comics ==
- Wonder Man (DC Comics), three DC comic book characters
- Wonder Man (Fox Publications), a Fox Publications superhero

== Film and television ==
- Wonder Man (film), a 1945 musical with Danny Kaye
- Wonderman (film), a 1979 Finnish science-fiction comedy
- The Wonder Man (film), a 1920 American film starring Georges Carpentier
- Wonder Man (TV series), 2026 series based on the Marvel superhero

== Music ==
- "Wonderman" (Right Said Fred song), 1994
- "Wonderman" (Tinie Tempah song), 2011

== Other uses ==
- "The Wonderman", sarcastic sobriquet of the Count of St. Germain, an 18th-century adventurer
- "The Wonder Man", Mahomet Allum, former "Afghan" cameleer who settled in Adelaide, Australia, and became known as a herbalist

== See also ==
- Wonder Boy (disambiguation)
- Wonder Woman (disambiguation)
- Wonder Girl
- Captain Wonder
