= Child genius =

Child genius could refer to:

- Child prodigy, a person under the age of ten who produces meaningful output in some domain to the level of an adult expert performer

== Entertainment ==
- Child Genius (Australian TV series) an Australian reality competition series produced by Warner Bros based on the UK TV series
- Child Genius (British TV series), a British reality competition series produced by Wall to Wall Media
- Child Genius (American TV series), an American reality competition series produced by Shed Media based on the UK TV series

== See also ==
- Boy Genius (disambiguation)
- Wunderkind (disambiguation)
- India's Child Genius, an Indian reality competition series
