= Captain Wonder =

Captain Wonder may refer to:

- Captain Wonder (DC Comics), a DC Comics supervillain
- Captain Wonder (Timely Comics), a Timely Comics superhero

== See also ==
- Wonder Man (disambiguation)
