= Current Biography =

American monthly magazine (1940-)

- Editor: Cliff Thompson
- Categories: Reference
- Frequency: Monthly
- Founded: 1940
- Company: H. W. Wilson Company
- Country: United States
- Language: English
- Website: www.hwwilsoninprint.com (print) www.ebscohost.com (online)
- ISSN: 0011-3344

Current Biography is an American monthly magazine published by the H. W. Wilson Company of New York City, a publisher of reference books, that appears every month except December. Current Biography contains profiles of people in the news and includes politicians, athletes, businessmen, and entertainers. Published since 1940, the articles are annually collected into bound volumes called Current Biography Yearbook. A December issue of the magazine is not published because the staff works on the final cumulative volume for the year. Articles in the bound volumes correct any mistakes that may have appeared in the magazine and may include additional relevant information about the subject that became available since publication of the original article. The work is a standard reference source in American libraries, and the publisher keeps in print the older volumes. Wilson also issues cumulative indexes to the set, and an online version is available as a subscription database.

== Monthly content ==
Current Biography profiles are written by the Wilson Company's in-house staff. They are typically produced by consulting previously published press accounts and occasionally by conducting interviews with the subjects. Running from 2,000 to 5,000 words, articles usually are accompanied by a black-and-white photograph of the subject, a mailing address for the subject, and a short bibliography. Between 15 and 20 profiles are included in each monthly issue. Obituaries are regularly printed of those previously profiled. They briefly summarize the life of the subject and add details occurring subsequent to the original profile. The entire series is available through the company's WilsonWeb online service, which many public libraries subscribe to.

Unlike other Wilson publications, when quoting, Current Biography cited authors, publication titles, and publication dates. These sources are not included in each entry's further reading section, which included page numbers but not authors.

A 1979 reference confirmed that Current Biography is a standard biographical reference work at accredited American library schools. Current Biography Yearbook provided short obituary notices from people of all nationalities.

Its first cumulated index, in 1973, aggregated and replaced the decennial indexes contained in the 1950, 1960, and 1970 Current Biography Yearbooks. It listed names alphabetically, with references to the relevant Current Biography issue or yearbook.

In 2003, the H.W. Wilson Company began publishing an annual sister volume, Current Biography International Yearbook, which focuses on people living outside the United States. This series was discontinued after publication of the 2007 volume.

Articles in Current Biography are often used and listed as supplemental material in obituaries that appear in major media outlets.

== Contributors ==
Notable contributors who have written for Current Biography include Cullen Thomas, the author of the prison memoir, Brother One Cell (2007); Mike Batistick, the author of the play, Ponies, which was produced Off-Broadway in 2003; Albert Rolls, the author of the books, Stephen King: A Biography (2008) and "Thomas Pynchon: The Demon in the Text" (2019) among others; Daniel Ford, author of "Flying Tigers: Claire Chennault and His American Volunteers, 1941-1942" (2016) and other books; and Yongsoo Park, author of the novels, Boy Genius (2001) and Las Cucarachas (2003), and the memoir The Art of Eating Bitter (2018), and writer-director of the independent feature film, Free Country (1996).

Charles Moritz served as editor-in-chief of Current Biography from 1957 until 1992. He was succeeded as editor-in-chief by Judith Graham and then Elizabeth A. Schick. From 1998 to 2011, the editor-in-chief was Clifford Thompson, winner of a 2013 Whiting Writers' Award for nonfiction for Love for Sale and Other Essays and author of Twin of Blackness: A Memoir as well as a novel, Signifying Nothing.

== Bibliography ==
- Ferguson, Gary L. (1988). "Lives of the Poets, Novelists, and Dramatists: The Wilson Authors Series". Reference Services Review. 16 (3): 31–44. doi:10.1108/eb049024. ISSN 0090-7324.
- Hallenberg, Albert (1999). "Review of The Scribner Encyclopedia of American Lives, vol. 1: 1981—85". Reference & User Services Quarterly. 38 (4): 425–427. ISSN 1094-9054. JSTOR 20863659.
- Larsen, John C. (1979). "Information Sources Currently Studied in General Reference Courses". RQ. 18 (4): 341–348. ISSN 0033-7072. JSTOR 25826228.
- Schultheiss, Tom (1974). "Reference books in print". Reference Services Review. 2 (1): 95–107. doi:10.1108/eb048509. ISSN 0090-7324.
