= Wonder Boy (disambiguation) =

Wonder Boy is a video game series by Sega.

Wonder Boy, Wonder Boys or Wonderboy may also refer to:

== Arts and entertainment ==
=== Fictional entities ===
- Wonder Boy (character), the name of two comic book superheroes
- Wonderboy, the baseball bat used by the main character in the novel The Natural and in the film adaptation

=== Film ===
- Wonder Boy (2017 film), a Singaporean musical film
- Wonder Boy (2019 film), a French documentary about Olivier Rousteing
- Wonder Boys (film), the 2000 comedy-drama adapted from Chabon's novel

=== Gaming ===
- Wonder Boy (video game), the first game in the Wonder Boy series

=== Literature ===
- Wonder Boys, a 1995 novel by Michael Chabon
- Wonderboy, a novel by Henrik Langeland

=== Music ===
- "Wonderboy" (The Kinks song), 1968
- "Wonderboy" (Tenacious D song), 2001
- "Wonder Boy", a 2011 song by After School
- "Wonder Boy", a 1964 song by Lesley Gore

== People ==
- Luka Dončić, basketball player known as El Niño Maravilla ('The Wonder Boy')
- Jeff Gordon (born 1971), NASCAR driver known as Wonder Boy
- Keith "Wonderboy" Johnson (1972–2022), American gospel singer-songwriter
- Stephen Thompson (fighter) (born 1983), American mixed martial arts fighter known as Wonder Boy

== Sports ==
- Wonder Boys, the nickname of the Arkansas Tech University men's athletic teams

== See also ==
- Boy Wonder (disambiguation)
- Wonder Man (disambiguation)
- Wunderkind (disambiguation)
