= Joe McCain =

American actor and journalist (born 1942)

- Born: Joseph Pinckney McCain II; April 26, 1942 (age 84); New London, Connecticut, U.S.
- Occupations: Actor, news reporter
- Known for: Brother of U.S. Senator and former presidential candidate John McCain
- Political party: Republican
- Parent(s): John S. McCain Jr. Roberta McCain
- Relatives: McCain family

Joseph Pinckney McCain II (born April 26, 1942) is an American stage actor, newspaper reporter, and the brother and only living sibling of the late U.S. Senator and two-time presidential candidate John McCain.

== Early life and education ==
Joseph Pinckney McCain II was born to John S. McCain Jr. and Roberta McCain on April 26, 1942, in the naval base hospital in New London, Connecticut. His father's perpetual traveling for Navy assignments meant that Joe had attended 17 different schools by the time he completed 9th grade. He entered the United States Naval Academy, but left in 1961 during his first year. Although he had tried to emulate his older brother, father (against his advice), grandfather and forebears, he later said "I just didn't like all the formations and inspections and things like that." He then attended the Norfolk Division of the College of William & Mary which became Old Dominion University, where he later said he "discovered fraternities and beer and girls."

== Vietnam era ==
Joe McCain was a member of the United States Navy and in 1965 to 1966 served as an enlisted man aboard the USS Enterprise (CVN-65) during the Vietnam War. During that conflict and his brother's long time as a prisoner of war, the National League of Families of American Prisoners and Missing in Southeast Asia, which included Joe, heightened awareness of the POWs' plight. In 1970, McCain sat in a bamboo cage in Los Angeles, eating simulated POW food to dramatize the plight of POWs. In the same year, he and two other brothers of POWs traveled around the U.S. circulating petitions to be presented to North Vietnamese representatives, and sought the signatures of opponents of the Vietnam War as well as those supporting it. He then helped bring 13 tons of mail to the North Vietnamese delegation at the Paris Peace Talks, demanding humane treatment for the POWs.

== Career ==
Following Vietnam, McCain tried both journalism and medical school before moving to acting. He worked at the San Diego Union and San Diego Evening Tribune, but got in trouble at one for perpetrating a prank. He subsequently became a dinner theater actor.

McCain married around 1998, but divorced in 2008, having no children. His brother John died on August 25, 2018, at the age of 81, and his sister Sandy died on November 6, 2019, at the age of 85.

== Political involvement ==
=== 2000 presidential election ===
McCain was a volunteer manager for his brother's 2000 presidential campaign in his home state of Virginia, making over 100 campaign appearances. He expressed anger at some of the tactics that George W. Bush used in defeating his brother, and said that the Republican Party needed to be reformed.

=== Possible congressional run ===
In 2001, Republican Party activists in Northern Virginia tried to recruit McCain to run for the U.S. House of Representatives from Virginia's 8th congressional district against the incumbent Democrat Jim Moran. They believed McCain's personal characteristics, combined with his brother's name and appeal to moderate voters, would allow an effective challenge. McCain declined to run, however, due to the growing Democratic tilt of the district, saying, "I don't mind running uphill for anything. But it looked like it was going to be a vertical wall."

=== Political views ===
In 2005, McCain was vocal in his reaction to revelations of Abu Ghraib torture and prisoner abuse during the Iraq War, saying "To be fighting from supposedly the higher ground, and yet to have allowed this kind of stuff that goes on in Abu Ghraib – it destroys the fact we're fighting for the better cause. It's just awful."

=== 2008 presidential election ===
During his brother's 2008 presidential campaign, McCain acted as a low-key surrogate. He was aware of the past foibles of presidential siblings and offered self-deprecating lines such as, "I'm the discount John McCain. They call me McKmart." On October 15, 2008, The Baltimore Sun obtained an e-mail written by McCain with the subject title "Shoaling" that spoke about his unhappiness with unnamed top campaign officials who "control the message" of his brother's run for president. McCain also received press coverage for remarks made in early October. In the context of describing his naval service postings in Arlington, Virginia and Alexandria, Virginia, McCain jokingly described northern Virginia as "communist country", for which he later apologized.
