= Boy Wonder =

Boy Wonder may refer to:

- The Boy Wonder or Robin, Batman's sidekick
- Boy Wonder (novel), a 1988 novel by James Robert Baker
- Boy Wonder (film), a 2010 film starring Caleb Steinmeyer
- Boy Wonder (album), a compilation album by Lenny Breau
- Boy Wonder (music producer) (born 1978), music producer, musician, and filmmaker
- Joel Selwood or Boy Wonder, Australian rules footballer
- Jim Christiana, a Pennsylvania state legislator
- Boy Wonder, the earlier name of the boy band Dream Street
- Boy Wonder, a Jewish gangster in The Apprenticeship of Duddy Kravitz
- Steny Hoyer, Maryland congressman
- Bucky Harris, baseball player-manager, lead the Washington Senators to their only World Series title in his rookie season

== See also ==
- Boi-1da (born 1986), Canadian hip-hop producer
- Wonder Boy (disambiguation)
