= Capitol Hill Club =

Private club in Washington, D.C., U.S.

- National Republican Club of Capitol Hill
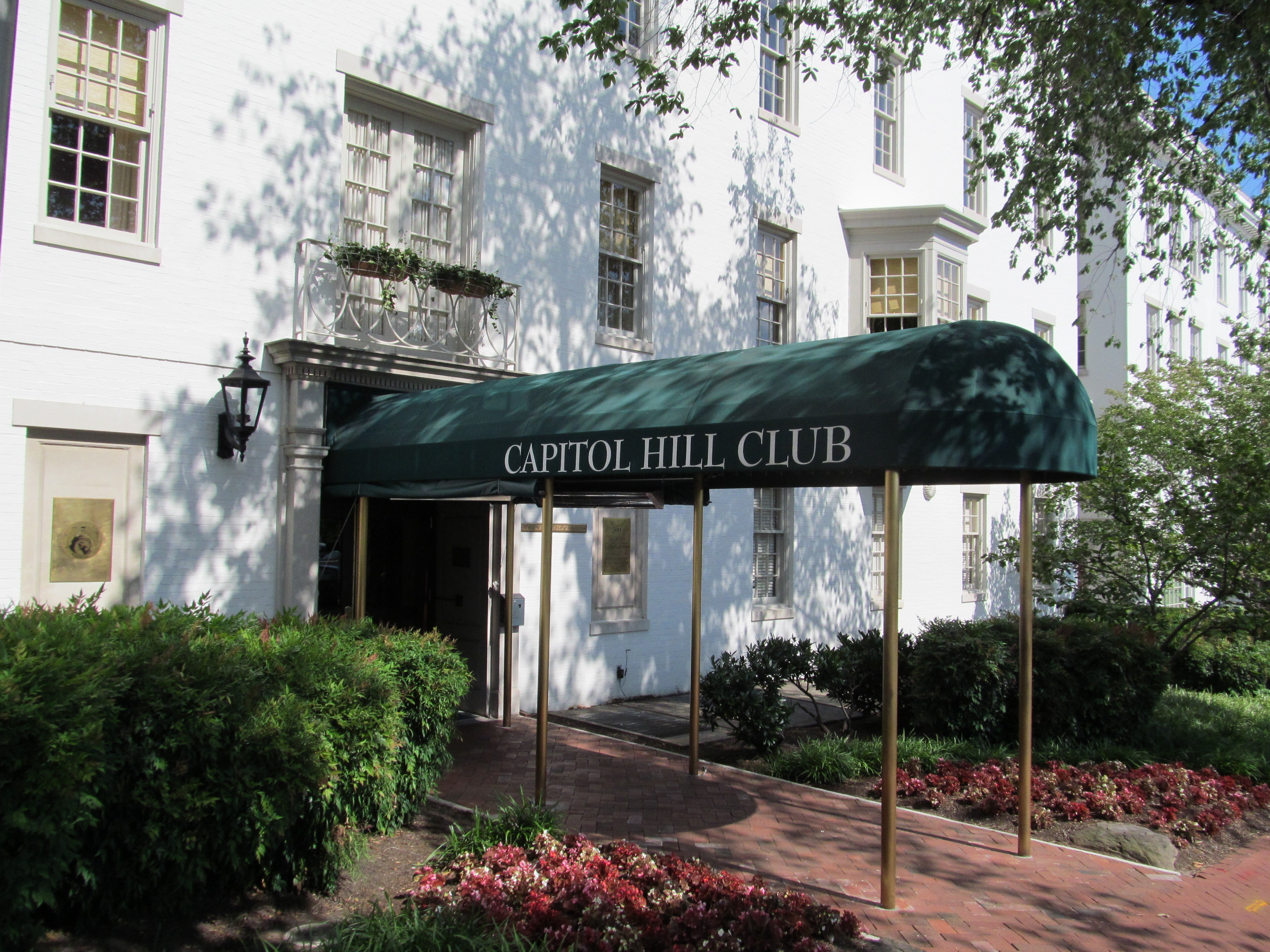
- Type: Social club
- Tax ID no.: 53-0200565
- Headquarters: 300 First Street SE
- Website: www.capitolhillclub.org

The National Republican Club of Capitol Hill, commonly known as the Capitol Hill Club, is a private club for Republicans in Washington, D.C.

== History ==
It was established in 1951 by former New Jersey Congressman James C. Auchincloss, who with 100 other members formed the club, which is now "one of the most popular gathering spots in Washington for lawmakers, government officials and other members of the political establishment."

While the club is located adjacent to the headquarters of the Republican National Committee, the two are not the same; the club is a distinct and separate organization from the Republican National Committee and has no official affiliation to the committee or the party.

The Capitol Hill Club is located at 300 First St SE on Capitol Hill in southeastern Washington 20003, less than two blocks from the United States Capitol and across from the Capitol South Metro station. It is the former home of John S. McCain Jr. and Roberta McCain.

On January 6, 2021, during the attack on the U.S. Capitol, a pipe bomb was placed outside the club by an unknown person. Another pipe bomb was placed near the Democratic National Committee building. As of July 2025, the FBI is still requesting information about the person who placed the bombs.

== See also ==
- List of American gentlemen's clubs
