= Navy Wives Clubs of America =

National non-profit organisation of the United States Navy

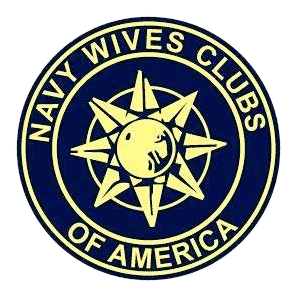
- Abbreviation: NWCA
- Formation: June 3, 1936
- Founder: Mary Paolozzi
- Founded at: Long Beach, California
- Type: Non-Profit
- Purpose: To promote a friendly, sympathetic relationship among the families of personnel of the United States Armed Forces.; To extend relief assistance to needy families from all ranks of the Armed Forces and the civilian community.; To foster a spirit of fellowship among its members and the civilian community.; To maintain and grant charters to local clubs adhering to the purposes, principles and policies of our federation.
- Members: Spouses of Enlisted and Officer personnel of the United States Navy, Marine Corps and Coast Guard. Associate Membership is given to other branch spouses and civilian members.
- National President: Darlene Carpenter
- National Vice President: Zach Horning
- Affiliations: United States Navy, United States Marine Corps, United States Coast Guard
- Website: Twitter: twitter.com/NationalNWCA Website: www.navywivesclubsofamerica.org

The Navy Wives Clubs of America (NWCA) is a national non-profit organization of enlisted and officer United States Navy, Marine Corps, and Coast Guard spouses whose purpose, by federal charter, is to support the Constitution of the United States, promote a friendly relationship between spouses of enlisted United States Navy, United States Marine Corps, or United States Coast Guard personnel, or those in the Reserve components of those branches, and to perform charitable activities as provided by the constitution or bylaws of the organization.

== History ==
NWCA was first chartered in 1936 in Long Beach, California, and was granted a federal charter in 1984.. In 2017 members of NWCA voted to allow male spouses of enlisted and officer armed service members and retirees to become regular members. In 2018 members of NWCA voted to rename the organization and to establish a DBA under Navy Wives Clubs of America and to name it Military Families Worldwide, this is currently being conducted. The NWCA is a 501(c)(3) non-profit organization. The official motto of the NWCA is: "They also serve, who stay and wait."

== Membership ==
Active membership is open to spouses of enlisted personnel serving in the United States Navy, Marine Corps, Coast Guard, and the active reserve units of these services. Spouses of enlisted personnel who have been honorably discharged, retired or have been transferred to the Fleet Reserve on completion of duty and widows of enlisted personnel in these services are also eligible for membership.

Associate membership is open to Army, Air Force, officer spouses, and those who have the same aims and goals of the organization but may not qualify for Active membership.

== Volunteer activities ==
NWCA Chapters all across the country participate in the annual Wreaths Across America event where thousands of wreaths are laid at veteran's cemeteries in tribute and remembrance.

== Scholarships ==
=== The NWCA National Scholarship Foundation ===
Thirty scholarship opportunities for the children of Navy, Coast Guard, and Marine personnel are awarded annually by the NWCA.

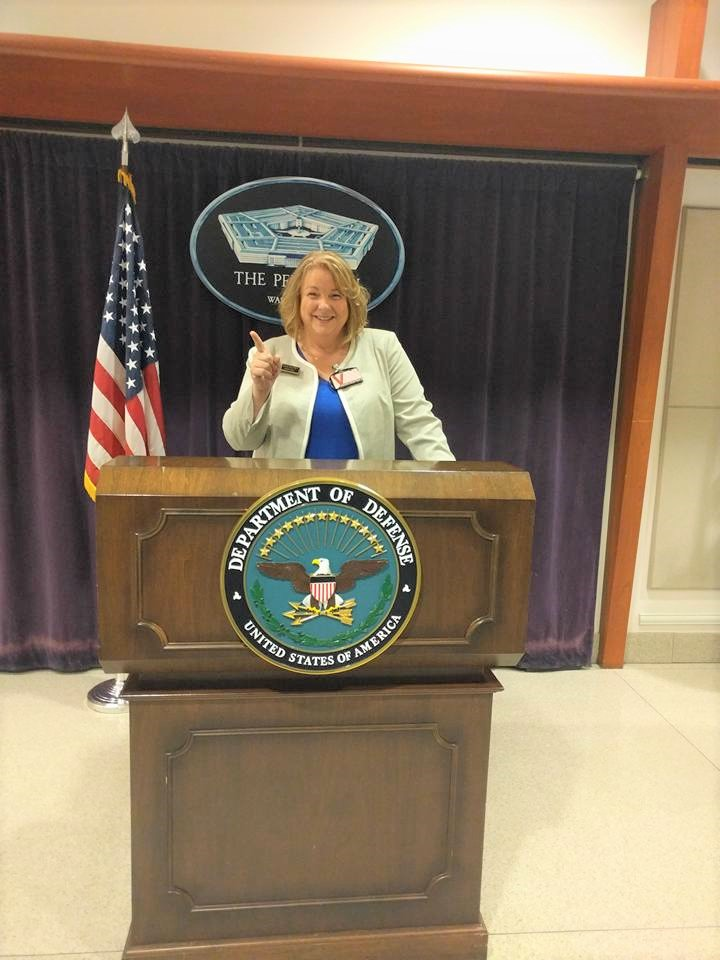
National President Sheryl Bice 2017-2019

=== Mary Paolozzi Member's Scholarship ===
This scholarship is only for members of NWCA.

=== The NMCCG Scholarship ===
This scholarship is only for SPOUSES (not children) of the enlisted Navy, Marine Corps, and Coast Guard who are continuing their education.

=== Judith Haupt Member's Child Scholarship ===
This scholarship is given to a child of an NWCA member who does NOT carry a military ID card usually because he/she has reached the adult age.

=== Pauline Langkamp Memorial Scholarship ===
This scholarship is given to a child of an NWCA member who does NOT carry a military ID card usually because he/she has reached the adult age or has married.
