= USS Gunnel =

Submarine of the United States

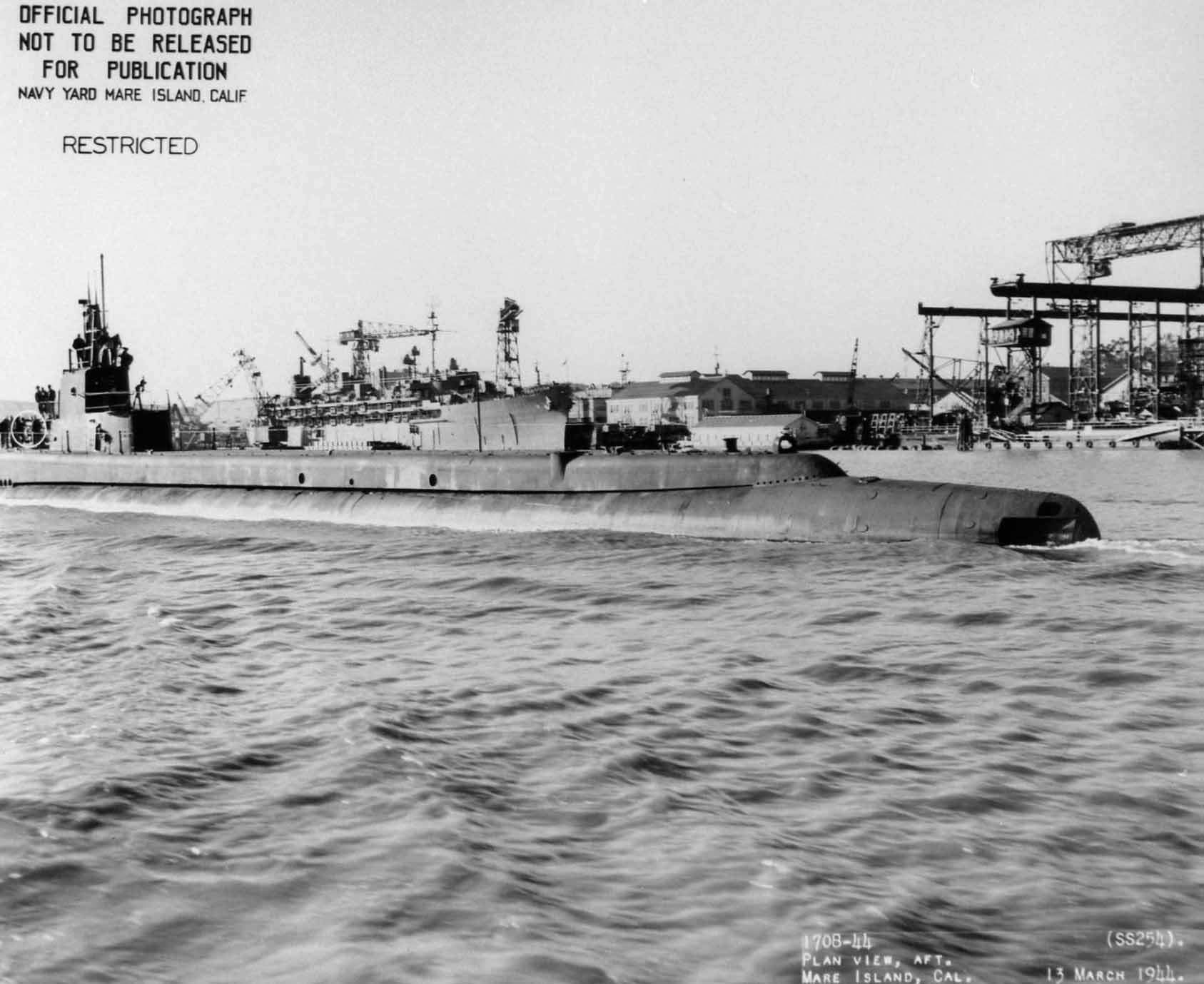

History

United States
- Builder: Electric Boat Company, Groton, Connecticut
- Laid down: 21 July 1941
- Launched: 17 May 1942
- Sponsored by: Mrs. Ben Morell
- Commissioned: 20 August 1942
- Decommissioned: 18 May 1946
- Stricken: 1 September 1958
- Fate: Sold for scrap, December 1959

General characteristics
- Class & type: Gato-class diesel-electric submarine
- Displacement: 1,525 long tons (1,549 t) surfaced; 2,424 long tons (2,463 t) submerged
- Length: 311 ft 9 in (95.02 m)
- Beam: 27 ft 3 in (8.31 m)
- Draft: 17 ft 0 in (5.18 m) maximum
- Propulsion: 4 × Hooven-Owens-Rentschler (H.O.R.) diesel engines driving electrical generators; 2 × 126-cell Sargo batteries; 4 × high-speed General Electric electric motors with reduction gears; two propellers; 5,400 shp (4.0 MW) surfaced; 2,740 shp (2.0 MW) submerged
- Speed: 21 kn (39 km/h) surfaced; 9 kn (17 km/h) submerged
- Range: 11,000 nmi (20,000 km) surfaced at 10 kn (19 km/h)
- Endurance: 48 hours at 2 kn (4 km/h) submerged; 75 days on patrol
- Test depth: 300 ft (90 m)
- Complement: 6 officers, 54 enlisted
- Armament: 10 × 21-inch (533 mm) torpedo tubes; 6 forward, 4 aft; 24 torpedoes; 1 × 3-inch (76 mm) / 50 caliber deck gun; Bofors 40 mm and Oerlikon 20 mm cannon

USS Gunnel (SS-253), a Gato-class submarine, was the only ship of the United States Navy to be named for the gunnel.

== Construction and commissioning ==
Gunnel′s keel was laid down by the Electric Boat Company, Groton, Connecticut. She was launched on 17 May 1942, sponsored by Mrs. Ben Morell, wife of the Chief of the Bureau of Yards and Docks, and commissioned on 20 August 1942, with Lieutenant Commander John S. "Jack" McCain, Jr. in command.

== Atlantic patrol ==
Gunnel's first war patrol (19 October – 7 December 1942) covered a passage from the United States to the United Kingdom, during which she participated in Operation Torch, the Allied invasion of French North Africa. One of six submarines assigned to Admiral Henry K. Hewitt's Western Naval Task Force, Gunnel did reconnaissance off Fedhala, French Morocco, on 6 November 1942, two days before the invasion, and on D-day, 8 November 1942, made infrared signals to guide the approaching fleet to the beachheads. She was off Casablanca, French Morocco, on the morning of 8 November when a United States Army Air Forces P-40 Warhawk fighter mistakenly strafed her, forcing her to crash-dive. At 12:03, an aircraft Gunnel′s crew identified as an American bomber began an attack run against her, forcing her to crash-dive again. Her crew heard an explosion as she passed through a depth of 150 feet (46 m). Gunnel suffered no damage or casualties in either attack.

With her missions accomplished, Gunnel departed the waters off French North Africa for Rosneath, Scotland, on 7 December 1942 to terminate her first patrol. En route home, the drive gears of her HOR engines failed, forcing her to complete the final 1,000 nautical miles (1,900 km; 1,200 mi) on her auxiliary diesel engine, leading to a major overhaul at Portsmouth Naval Shipyard in Kittery, Maine.

== Pacific patrols ==
=== Second and third patrols ===
Subsequently, assigned to the United States Pacific Fleet, Gunnel proceeded to Pearl Harbor, Hawaii, then to her second war patrol (28 May – 3 July 1943) in waters west of Kyūshū in the East China Sea. Success crowned her efforts when she sank the cargo ship Kayo Maru (6,300 gross register tons) on 15 June 1943, giving Gunnel her first kill, and four days later when another cargo ship, Tokiwa Maru (7,000 gross register tons), was sent under. Both sinkings were confirmed by Joint Army–Navy Assessment Committee (JANAC) postwar.

After overhaul at Mare Island, California, the submarine accomplished a third war patrol (17 November 1943 – 7 January 1944) in Japanese home waters off Honshū. This, too, was successful; on 4 December 1943 Gunnel sent passenger-cargo ship Hiyoshi Maru to the bottom.

=== Fourth, fifth, sixth patrols ===
The fourth war patrol (5 February – 6 April 1944) took Gunnel from Midway Atoll to Fremantle, Australia, and in the South China, Sulu, and Celebes Seas. Bad luck dogged Gunnel and she was forced to return to port having made no further kills. On 29 March 1944, during her return voyage, a United States Army Air Forces Fifth Air Force B-24 Liberator mistakenly attacked her off Australia, dropping a bomb as she crash-dived. She suffered no damage or casualties. After an overnight stop at Darwin, Australia, she proceeded to Fremantle, where she concluded her patrol on 6 April 1944.

Gunnel′s fifth and sixth patrols, 3 May – 4 July 1944 and 29 July – 22 September 1944, found her again in the southern approaches of the Sunda Strait and cruising in the Sulu Sea-Manila area but failed to add to her score.

=== Seventh and eighth patrols ===
During her seventh patrol (21 October – 28 December 1944) in the South China and Sulu Seas, she sank the Torpedo Boat Sagi (600 tons) between 4–8 November; passenger-cargo ship Shunten Maru (5,600 tons); and Torpedo Boat Hiyodori (600 tons) between 10 and 17 November. On this same patrol Gunnel evacuated 11 naval aviators at Palawan 1 to 2 December after the fliers had been protected by friendly guerrilla forces for some 2 months.

She conducted her eighth patrol (13 June – 24 July 1945) in the Bungo Suido area. She attacked an unescorted Japanese submarine 9 July. The great range and speed of the enemy, however, caused Gunnel's torpedoes to miss. She returned from the patrol after duty as a lifeguard ship for B-29s flying toward Japan on bombing missions.

== Postwar ==
Gunnel was refitting at Pearl Harbor at war's end in August 1945. She was ordered to New London, Connecticut, where she decommissioned 18 May 1946. Her name was struck from the Navy List 1 September 1958 and she was sold for scrapping in August 1959.

== Honors and awards ==
- European–African–Middle Eastern Campaign Medal with one battle star
- Asiatic–Pacific Campaign Medal with four battle stars

Gunnel′s first, second, third, and seventh war patrols were designated "successful." In the Joint Army-Navy Assessment Committee (JANAC) accounting postwar, she was credited with six ships sunk totaling 24,624 gross register tons.
