= Yongsoo Park =

Korean American author

Yongsoo Park is a Korean American writer who has authored the novels Boy Genius (ISBN 1888451246) and Las Cucarachas (ISBN 1888451564), the essay collection The Art of Eating Bitter: A Hausfrau Dad's Journey with Kids (ISBN 1720767505), and the memoir Rated R Boy: Growing Up Korean in 1980s Queens (ISBN 1654216747).

== Critical reception ==
Kathleen Alcala, while being interviewed about magical realism for Margin, described Boy Genius as being among "the most subversive magical realism".
