= November Group (band) =

American alternative music band

- November Group album cover

Background information
- Origin: Boston, Massachusetts, United States
- Genres: New wave, post-punk, pop rock
- Past members: Ann Prim; Kearney Kirby; Joel Beale; Alvan Long

November Group were an alternative musical group, and a participant of the Boston new wave scene in the early 1980s. The group was formed primarily around two female musicians, vocalist and guitarist Ann Prim and keyboardist Kearney Kirby. Other members included Joel Beale and Alvan Long. The band took their name from a group of early twentieth-century German expressionist artists known as November Group. The group's musical style has been described as cold wave.

== History ==
November Group formed in Boston in the early 1980s by Ann Prim and Kearney Kirby, former members of the group Wunderkind. The group produced cold, arty synthesizer music. Their first major album release was Work that Dream, releases in 1985 on A & M Records. They also recorded an EP in Germany with Peter Hauke of early electronic music pioneers, Tangerine Dream.

== Discography ==
The discography of November Group includes three albums, an EP, and some singles.

- November Group on Modern Method Records -1982
  - "Pictures of the Homeland" from November Group
- Persistent Memories on Brain Eater Records - 1983
  - "Put Your Back to It" from Persistent Memories
- Work That Dream EP on A&M Records - 1985
- NG89 - 1989 (released on cassette tape)
