= AK-15 =

AK-15 may refer to:

- USS Sirius (AK-15), a cargo ship of the US Navy
- AK-15, a variant of the AK-12 assault rifle chambered for the 7.62×39mm cartridge
