= William A. McCain =

United States Army general (1878–1960)

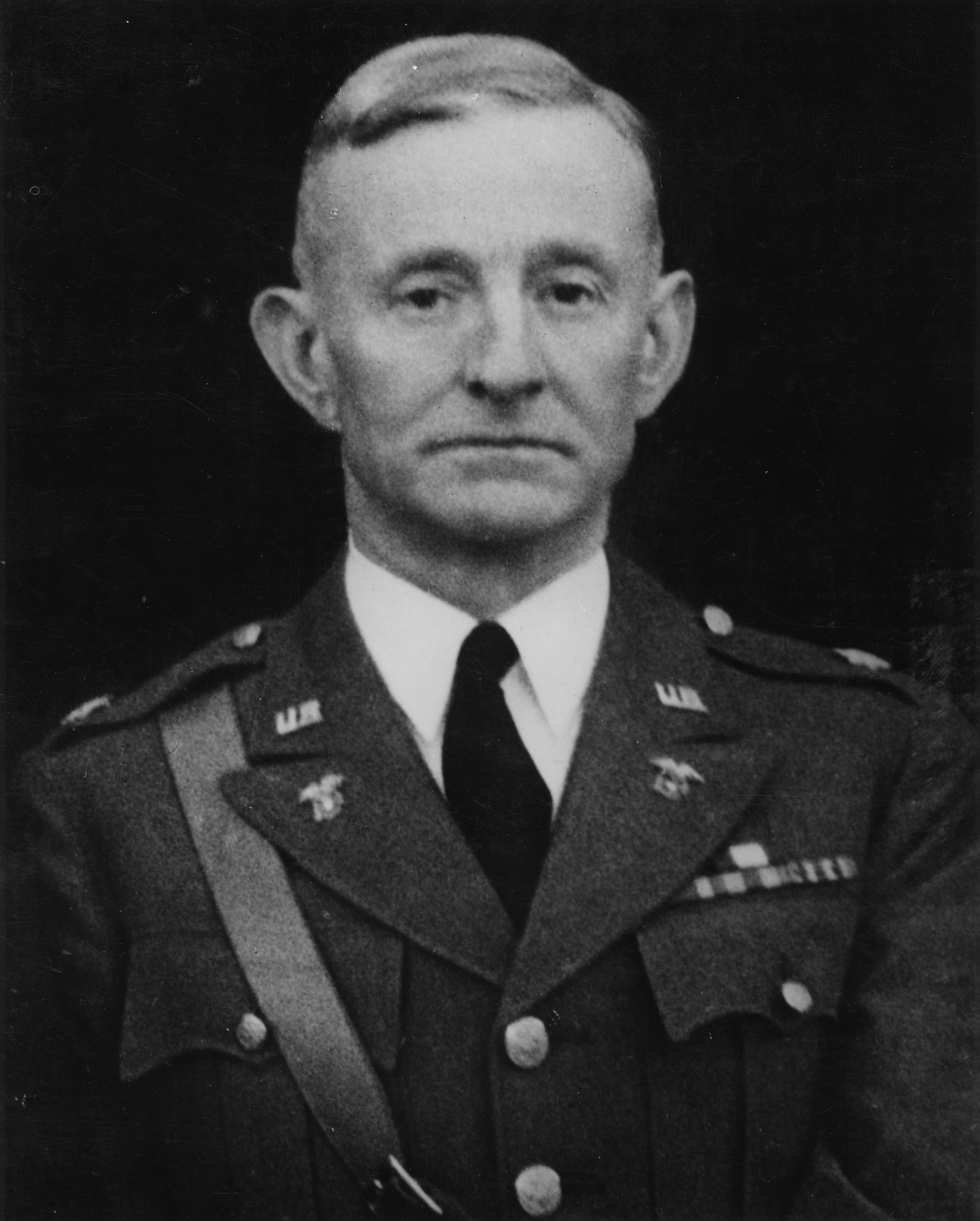
- McCain as a colonel in 1935
- Born: 25 August 1878; Carrollton, Mississippi, US
- Died: 13 May 1960 (aged 81); Doylestown, Pennsylvania, US
- Burial place: Arlington National Cemetery
- Alma mater: United States Military Academy; Army Industrial College; United States Army War College
- Spouse: Mary Louise Earle (m. 1905–1942)
- Children: 1
- Relatives: John S. McCain Sr. (brother); Henry Pinckney McCain (uncle); John S. McCain Jr. (nephew); John McCain (grand-nephew)
- Military career
- Service: United States Army
- Service years: 1902–1942
- Rank: Brigadier General
- Service number: O-1711
- Units: US Army Cavalry Branch; US Army Quartermaster Corps
- Commands: Fort Washakie; 26th Recruit Company; Chief of Transportation, American Forces in Germany; Procurement Division, Philadelphia Quartermaster Depot; Army Industrial College; Philadelphia Quartermaster Depot
- Wars: Mexican Border War; World War I Occupation of the Rhineland; World War II
- Awards: Army Distinguished Service Medal (2)

William Alexander McCain (25 August 1878 – 13 May 1960) was a career officer in the United States Army. A 1902 graduate of the United States Military Academy at West Point, he attained the rank of brigadier general. A veteran of the Mexican Border War, World War I, and World War II, he specialized in Quartermaster activities, and his commands included the Philadelphia Quartermaster Depot. McCain served from 1902 until nearly reaching the mandatory retirement age in 1942; he retired for disability a few weeks before his 64th birthday. McCain's awards included the Army Distinguished Service Medal with oak leaf cluster.

A native of Carrollton, Mississippi and a member of the prominent McCain family, McCain was educated in the local schools and attended the University of Mississippi before receiving an appointment to West Point in 1898. he graduated in 1902 and was commissioned in the Cavalry. He served in the western United States and the Philippines, including a posting as the last commander of Fort Washakie, Wyoming before the army abandoned the post. During the Mexican Border War, he took part in Cavalry patrols on the U.S. border with Mexico and he participated in the 1916 Battle of Columbus. During World War I, McCain served on the staff of the 83rd Division and as Ordnance officer of the V Corps. After the war, he took part in the Occupation of the Rhineland as assistant chief of staff for Logistics (G-4) at the headquarters of the army's Services of Supply.

After the First World War, McCain graduated from the Army Industrial College and United States Army War College, and served as chief of the procurement division at the Philadelphia Quartermaster Depot and director of the Army Industrial College. From 1934 until retiring in 1942, McCain commanded the Philadelphia Quartermaster Depot, a period which included providing clothing for the Civilian Conservation Corps during the Great Depression and the army at the start of the Second World War.

In retirement, McCain became a resident of Doylestown, Pennsylvania. He died in Doylestown on 13 May 1960. He was buried at Arlington National Cemetery.

== Early life ==
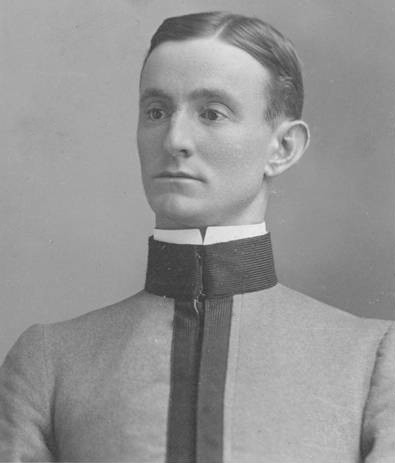
McCain as a West Point cadet in 1902

McCain was born in Carrollton, Mississippi on 25 August 1878, a son of John Sidney McCain (1851–1934) and Elizabeth Ann Hart (Young) McCain. Among his siblings was John S. McCain Sr., an admiral in the United States Navy. His family also included an uncle, Brigadier General Henry Pinckney McCain, Admiral John S. McCain Jr., who was his nephew, and US Senator John S. McCain III, who was his grand-nephew. McCain was raised and educated in Carrollton and attended the University of Mississippi from 1895 to 1896. In 1897, McCain passed was the top scorer on a competitive examination for appointment to West Point. He began attendance in 1898 and graduated in 1902 ranked 44th of 54. His classmates who also became general officers included Walter K. Wilson Sr. and John Knowles Herr. Among his prominent classmates who did not attain general officer rank were Adam Casad and Harry Nelly. At graduation, McCain received his commission as a second lieutenant of Cavalry.

== Start of career ==
McCain was initially assigned to the 8th Cavalry Regiment and posted to Fort Riley, Kansas. In 1905, he graduated from the School of Application for Infantry and Cavalry. From May 1905 to April 1907, he served with his regiment at Camp Wallace, Philippines. McCain served with the 8th Cavalry at Fort Robinson, Nebraska from May to September. From September to November 1907, he was posted to Hermosa, South Dakota as part of a progressive military mapping project.

From December 1907 to April 1909, McCain served with the 8th Cavalry at Fort Washakie, Wyoming, where he was the final commander of the post before it was abandoned by the army. From April 1909 to February 1911, he served again at Fort Robinson. In March 1911, McCain received promotion to first lieutenant, and he served with the 8th Cavalry in the Philippines from March 1911 to February 1914, including postings to Batangas City, Fort William McKinley, Jolo, Sulu, and Fort Stotsenburg. In February 1914, McCain returned to the United States and joined the 15th Cavalry Regiment at Fort Bliss, Texas. From 1914 to 1916, he took part in Mexican Border War activities at locations including Ysleta and Fabens in Texas. In March 1916, he took part in the US response to the Battle of Columbus, during which the forces of Mexican revolutionary Pancho Villa attacked a town in New Mexico. McCain was promoted to captain in July 1916.

== Continued career ==
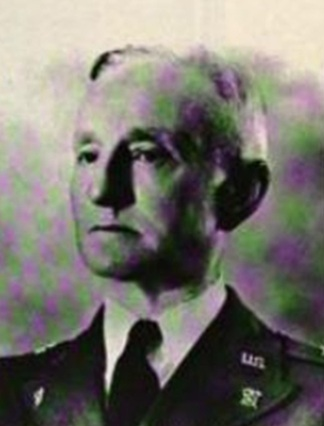
McCain as director of the Army Industrial College in 1932

From December 1916 to August 1917, McCain commanded the 26th Recruit Company at Columbus Barracks, Ohio. With the army expanding after American entry into World War I in April 1917, McCain was promoted to temporary major in August. He was then assigned to the 83rd Division at Camp Sherman, Ohio; after completing organization and training, the division was transported to Camp Merritt, New Jersey so it could embark for France. The unit arrived at Le Havre in June 1918, and in July, McCain received promotion to temporary lieutenant colonel. In August, he was assigned as Ordnance officer of the V Corps. He served with V Corps through the end of the war and took part in battles including the Battle of Saint-Mihiel and the Meuse–Argonne offensive.

Following the Armistice of November 11, 1918, McCain took part in the post-war Occupation of the Rhineland. In March 1919, he was assigned as assistant chief of staff for Logistics (G-4) at the Services of Supply headquarters in Tours. He received temporary promotion to colonel in May, and returned to the United States in July. He was then assigned to the staff of the army's deputy chief of staff for Intelligence (G-2). McCain's wartime performance was commended with citations from both the V Corps commander, Charles Pelot Summerall, and John J. Pershing, the commander of the American Expeditionary Forces. Both men went on to become Chief of Staff of the United States Army.

In July 1920, McCain was assigned to the port of Antwerp, Belgium as assistant to the U.S. Army commander, responsible for the transportation of demobilized troops and equipment. From October 1920 to February 1922, he was assigned to Koblenz as chief of Transportation for American Forces in Germany. From February to August 1922, he served on the Water Transportation staff at the New York General Intermediate Depot, where he continued his work on transporting demobilized equipment and soldiers from Europe to the United States. From August to October 1922, he was assigned as quartermaster for the military's National Marksmanship Matches at Camp Perry, Ohio. From October 1922 to January 1924, McCain served as surplus property control officer at the New York General Intermediate Depot.

== Later career ==
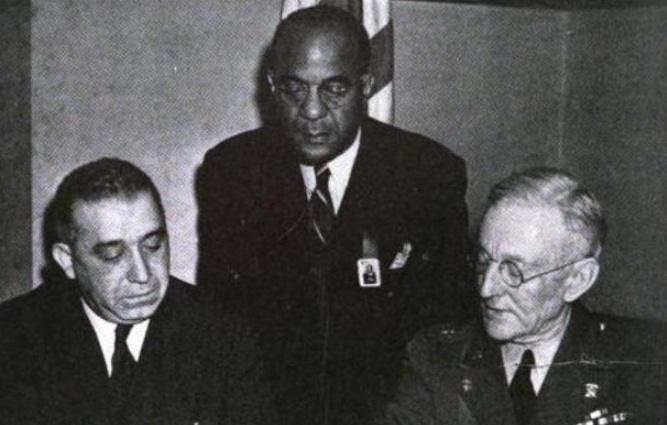
L to R: Irving McNutt (principal accountant), Clarence Munroe (McNutt's assistant), and William A. McCain, at Philadelphia Quartermaster Depot in 1942.

From February to June 1924, McCain was a student at the Army Industrial College (now the Dwight D. Eisenhower School for National Security and Resource Strategy). From July 1924 to August 1927, he served on the planning staff in the office of the United States Assistant Secretary of War. In August 1924, he again served as quartermaster for the National Marksmanship Matches at Camp Perry, and he was promoted to lieutenant colonel in July 1925. McCain was a student at the United States Army War College from August 1927 to July 1928. From July 1928 to July 1930, McCain was chief of the procurement division at the Philadelphia Quartermaster Depot. He was then appointed director of the Army Industrial College.

In June 1934, McCain was promoted to colonel and in July he was appointed to command the Philadelphia Quartermaster Depot. He remained in command of the depot through American entry into World War II and received promotion to temporary brigadier general in October 1940. McCain was retired for disability on 30 June 1942, shortly before he would have reached the mandatory retirement age of 64 in August. He retired as a colonel, but on 16 August 1948 he was advanced to brigadier general on the retired list.

In retirement, McCain resided in Doylestown, Pennsylvania. He was a member of the Phi Delta Theta fraternity and the Army and Navy Club of Washington, D.C. Other memberships included the National Security League and the English-Speaking Union. In addition, McCain was a member of the Association of Quartermasters and the Military Order of the World Wars. McCain was a member of the Sons of the American Revolution, and his ancestors included four Patriots. From 1933, McCain was a member of the Society of the Cincinnati by right of descent from Captain John Young, who served with Virginia state troops during the American Revolutionary War. In his later years, his health began to fail as a result of his years of strenuous Cavalry service, and he experienced partial blindness and arthritis that was severe enough to require the use of a wheelchair. He died in Doylestown on 13 May 1960 and was buried at Arlington National Cemetery.

== Awards ==
McCain's awards and decorations included the Army Distinguished Service Medal for his First World War service, and a second award of the DSM to recognize his World War II accomplishments.

=== First Distinguished Service Medal citation ===
The President of the United States of America, authorized by Act of Congress, July 9, 1918, takes pleasure in presenting the Army Distinguished Service Medal to Lieutenant Colonel (Field Artillery) William Alexander McCain, United States Army, for exceptionally meritorious and distinguished services to the Government of the United States, in a duty of great responsibility during World War I. As Ordnance Officer of the 5th Army Corps, Colonel McCain displayed superior judgment, exceptional ability, and zealous devotion to duty, and executed successfully the difficult problems of the supply of munitions, thereby contributing materially to the success of the operations of the 5th Army Corps, and rendering important services to the American Expeditionary Forces, in the operations against the enemy during the St. Mihiel and Meuse-Argonne offensives.

Service: United States Army Rank: Lieutenant Colonel (Field Artillery) Division: 5th Army Corps, American Expeditionary Forces Action Date: World War I Orders: War Department, General Orders No. 12 (1929)

=== Second Distinguished Service Medal citation ===
For exceptionally meritorious and distinguished services in a position of great responsibility as Commanding Officer of the Philadelphia Quartermaster Depot, Philadelphia, Pennsylvania, during the period July 9, 1934 until his retirement June 30, 1942. Brigadier General McCain was responsible for the organization and supervision of a tremendously rapid and extensive program at the Philadelphia Depot to provide the necessary clothing to meet the ever increasing demands of an expanding army. He displayed outstanding foresight, initiative, energy, and ability in the successful execution of a difficult assignment during one of the most critical periods in the history of the Quartermaster Corps and thereby contributed in a marked degree to the war effort.

Service: United States Army Rank: Colonel Division: Quartermaster Corps Action Date: World War II Orders: War Department, General Orders No. 62 (1942)

=== Additional honors ===
In 1994, McCain was inducted into the Defense Personnel Support Center Hall of Fame in recognition of his efforts to clothe the Civilian Conservation Corps while commanding the Philadelphia Quartermaster Depot during the 1930s.

== Dates of rank ==
- Second Lieutenant, 12 June 1902
- First Lieutenant, 5 March 1911
- Captain, 1 July 1916
- Major (National Army), 5 August 1917
- Lieutenant Colonel (National Army), 30 July 1918
- Colonel (National Army), 6 May 1919
- Captain, 30 June 1920
- Major, 1 July 1920
- Lieutenant Colonel, 18 July 1925
- Colonel, 1 June 1934
- Brigadier General (Army of the United States), 25 October 1940
- Colonel (Retired), 30 June 1942
- Brigadier General (Retired), 16 August 1948
