= John Knowles Herr =

United States Army general

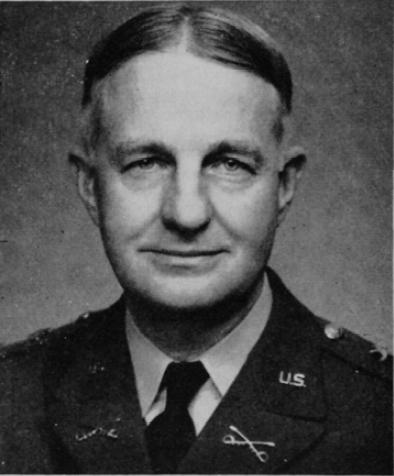
- Born: October 1, 1878; Whitehouse, New Jersey
- Died: March 12, 1955 (aged 76); Washington, D.C.
- Military career
- Allegiance: United States
- Branch: United States Army
- Service years: 1902–1942
- Rank: Major General
- Commands: 1st Squadron, 3rd Cavalry Regiment; 7th Cavalry Regiment; Chief of Cavalry
- Conflicts: Spanish–American War; World War I World War II
- Awards: Distinguished Service Medal

Signature
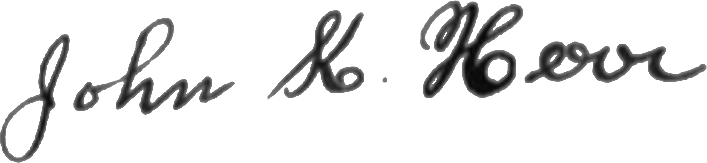

John Knowles Herr (October 1, 1878 – March 12, 1955) was a career American soldier. Herr served for 40 years in the United States Cavalry and participated in the final battles of World War I as chief of staff of the 30th Division, but is best remembered for being the last Chief of U.S. Cavalry. In March 1938 Major General Herr was appointed Chief of Cavalry and became a fierce advocate of traditional horse cavalry troops. He defended cavalry as an independent branch of service and opposed conversion of mounted troops into mechanized or armored units. Herr's affection to horse, "somewhat quixotic" for the period, temporarily made him "a hero and a standard bearer" to generations of officers indoctrinated in cavalry tactics.

German blitzkrieg in Poland and France compelled the military leadership in favor of armoured warfare, and the United States cavalry was mechanized contrary to Herr's objections. General Robert W. Grow wrote that "had General Herr, from the beginning, taken a strong stand to mechanization of the Cavalry Branch, the Armored Force would have never been created" (as a separate combat arm). Instead, Herr "lost it all": and his troops were gradually converted to armor. On March 9, 1942, War Department Circular No. 59 created the Army Ground Forces, Services of Supply, and Army Air Forces; and disbanded the offices of the combat arms chiefs, including Chief of Cavalry. Herr retired. He continued to speak in favor of the horse and co-authored The Story of the U.S. Cavalry (1953).

Historians' assessment of Herr's four-year service as Chief of Cavalry range from "stubborn obstructionist" (Hofmann), "conservative and downright mossback" (Millett), "diehard proponent of the horse" (Winton and Mets) to "noble and tragic in his loyalty to horse ... and refusal to accept reality after Munich." (Jarymowycz). and "gallant and highly regarded officer ... proof that outdated beliefs would die hard" (D'Este).

== Biography ==
=== Early years ===
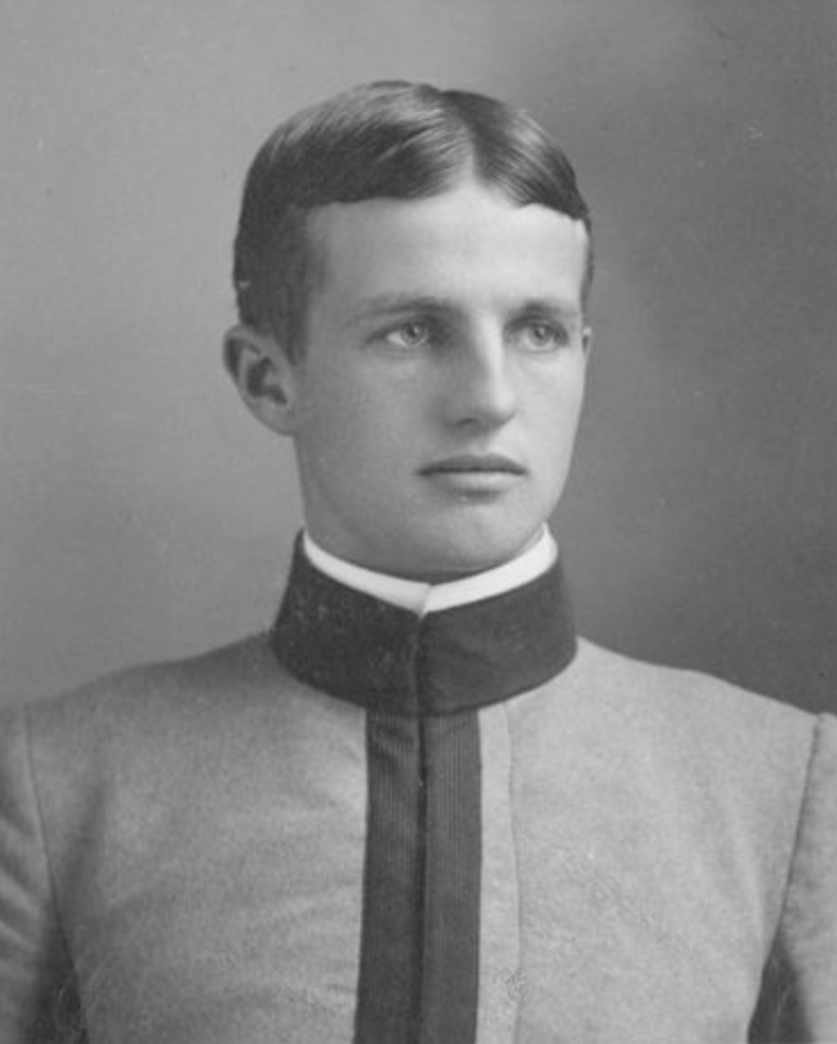
At West Point in 1902

John K. Herr was born in the Whitehouse section of Readington Township, New Jersey, on October 1, 1878, the son of a New Jersey judge. He attended Reading Academy in Flemington and Lafayette College in Easton, Pennsylvania. After the outbreak of the Spanish–American War he dropped out of Lafayette and enrolled at the United States Military Academy (In 1942 Lafayette awarded Herr the honorary degree of Doctor of Science (D.Sc.).) In 1901 he and four other cadets were dismissed from the academy after a hazing incident, but Herr fought for his reinstatement, returned to the academy and graduated in May 1902. His classmates who also became general officers included William A. McCain and Walter K. Wilson Sr. Among his prominent classmates who did not attain general officer rank were Adam Casad and Harry Nelly. He was assigned to the 7th Cavalry Regiment and served with this regiment in Chickamauga, Georgia, the Philippines, and Fort Riley. In 1911 he was summoned back to West Point as an instructor, promoted to First Lieutenant and then assigned to the 11th Cavalry Regiment based in Fort Oglethorpe, Georgia. In 1916 he served in Hawaii with the 4th Cavalry Regiment in the rank of captain.

=== World War I and interbellum ===
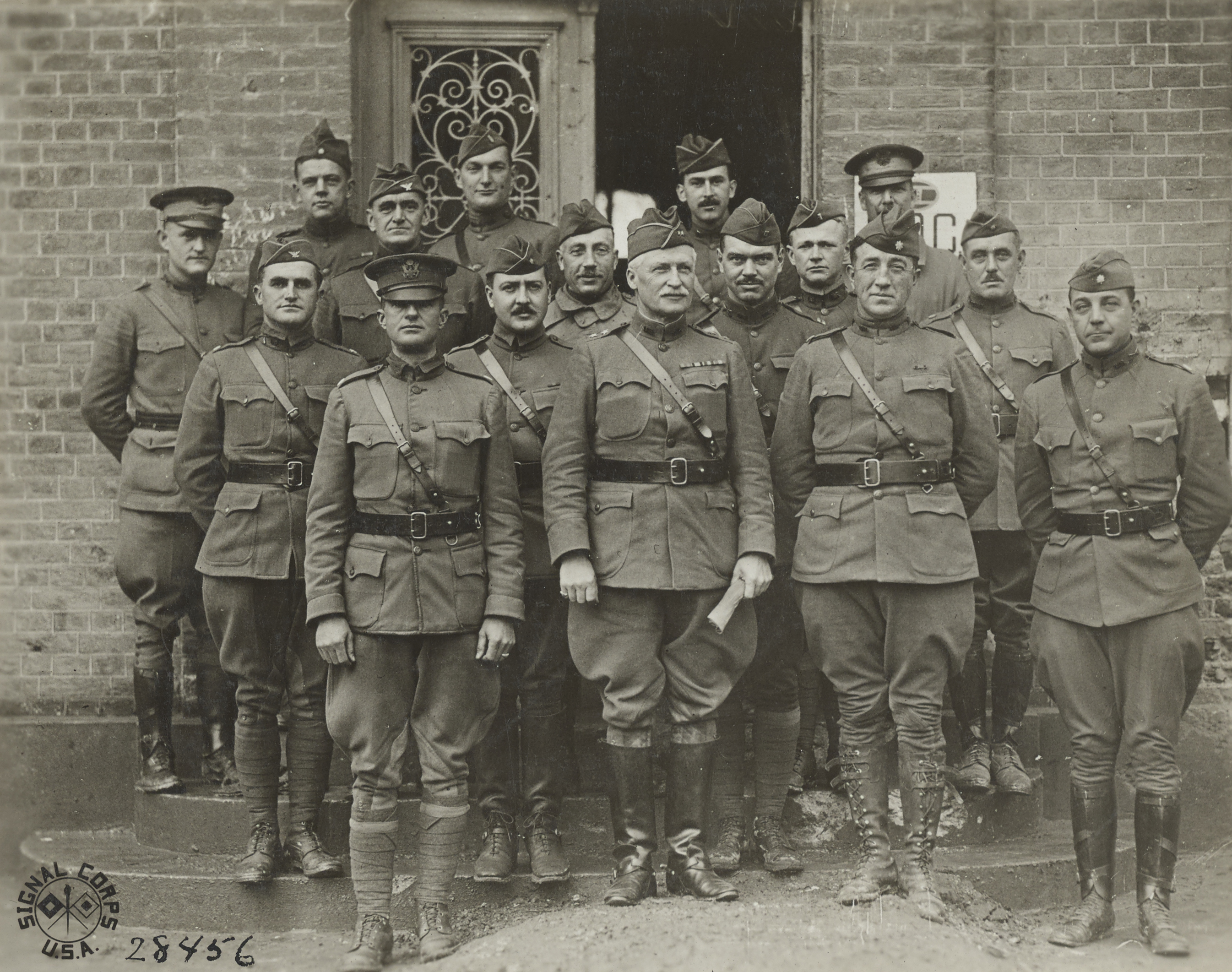
Major General Edward M. Lewis (center), commanding the 30th Division, pictured here together with members of his divisional staff in France, October 20, 1918. Stood to Lewis's right is the 30th's chief of staff, Colonel John H. Kerr.

In August 1917, four months after the American entry into World War I, Major Herr returned to the United States to train soldiers for the Great War at Camp Dix. By the end of 1917 he sailed to Europe where he served with the British 19th Division and attended the French War College at Langres. He turned down the offer to join the Tank Corps and instead became Chief of Staff of the 30th "Old Hickory" Division, a National Guard formation under the command of Major General Edward Mann Lewis. Like most American cavalrymen of World War I, he never served in active cavalry combat. He remained in infantry until the end of the war. His actions during the war were rewarded with the receipt of the Army Distinguished Service Medal. The citation for the medal reads:

The President of the United States of America, authorized by Act of Congress, July 9, 1918, takes pleasure in presenting the Army Distinguished Service Medal to Colonel (Cavalry) John Knowles Herr, United States Army, for exceptionally meritorious and distinguished services to the Government of the United States, in a duty of great responsibility during World War I. Colonel Herr showed marked ability as Chief of Staff of the 30th Division in the capture of Voormezeele and Lock Eight in the Ypres section in Belgium in September 1918, and in the breaking of the Hindenburg Line at Bellicourt, France, and the operations against the Selle River and the Sambre Canal from 29 September through 20 October 1918. By his energy and zeal, and persistent efforts, coupled with sound tactical judgment, Colonel Herr contributed to the success of the operations.

With the end of the war his rank decreased from temporary war-time colonel to captain. Slowly, Herr advanced through the ranks. In the early 1920s he served in Coblenz, Germany; in 1923 he was a member of the "legendary" American polo team that defeated the British team. He attended Army War College in 1926–1927 and served there as an instructor in 1928–1932. From 1932 to 1933 he commanded 1st Squadron, 3rd Cavalry Regiment at Fort Ethan Allen, Vermont. From 1935 to 1938 he commanded the 7th Cavalry Regiment stationed at Fort Bliss.

=== Chief of Cavalry ===
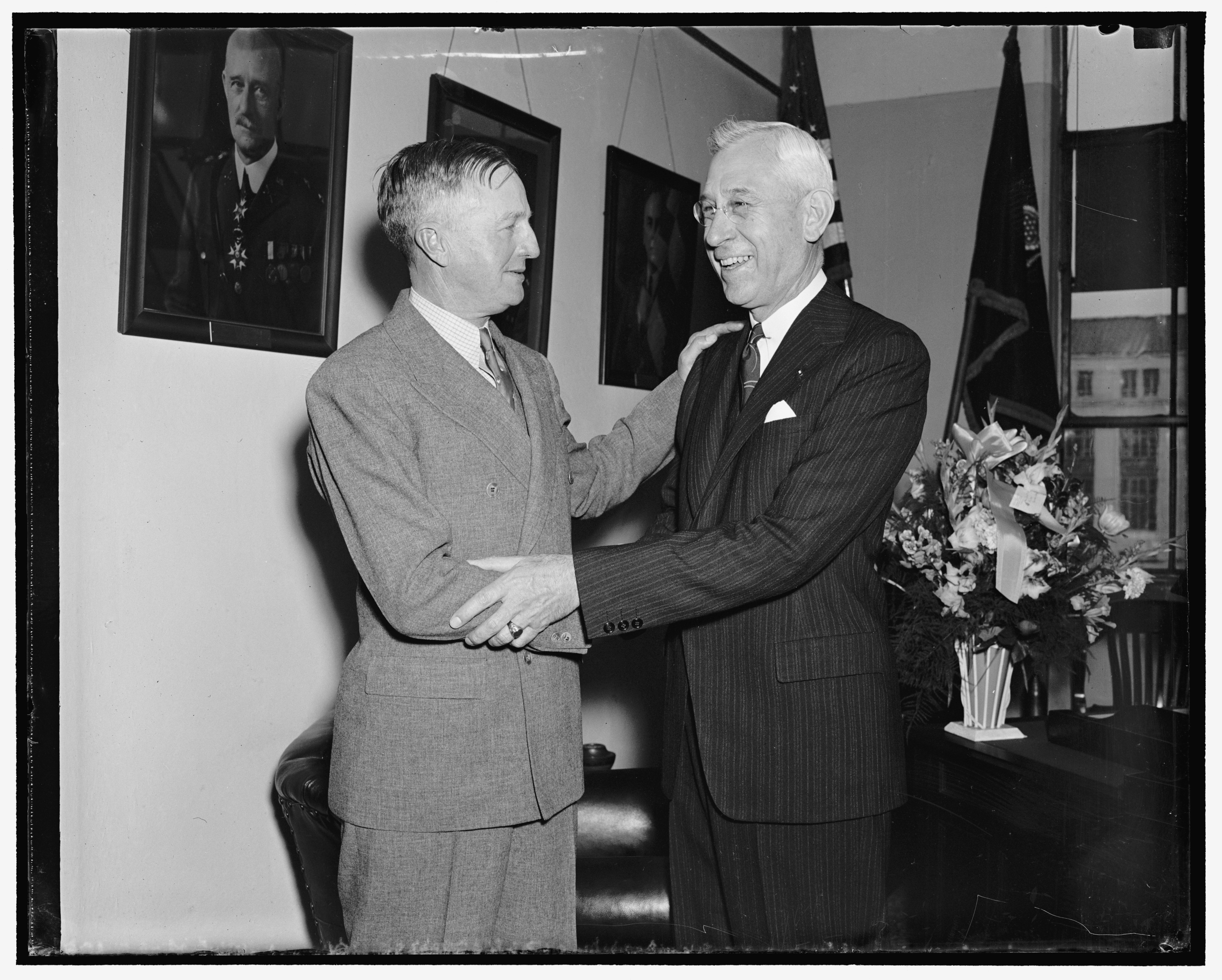
Herr (left) congratulates Robert M. Danford, who became Chief of Field Artillery on the same day Herr became Chief of Cavalry

Major General Leon Kromer, Chief of Cavalry, retired in the beginning of 1938. Kromer accepted mechanization of cavalry but the plans to deploy armored troops had not materialized yet. Cavalrymen expected promotion of Bruce Palmer (senior) but instead Chief of Staff Malin Craig selected Herr. Herr assumed the position of Chief of Cavalry on March 26, 1938, and held it for nearly four years, to March 9, 1942. He disposed with Kromer's liberalism and created his own environment where "only horse advocates had a voice." He re-introduced the saber, abolished in 1934. His stance towards mechanization, shared by Craig, was based on two assertions: that he will not give away a single man or trade a single horse to the mechanized units, and that the time for mechanization has not come yet. He enforced a formal policy that any increase in mechanized forces must be preceded by a proportional increase in horse cavalry; as a result the 7th Cavalry Brigade remained the only mechanized unit until 1940. Later, he had to admit the rising power of armor, but was just as unwilling to dismount his troops or "give away" officers.

After the outbreak of World War II Herr followed the European campaigns through attaché reports that reinforced his belief in superiority of cavalry tactics. His chief of staff Willis D. Crittenberger pre-screened these reports and jotted "cavalry mission" in the margins to attract Herr's attention. Herr's own interpretation of the intelligence was biased in favor of the horse. He believed that the Wehrmacht relied on horses because of German operational doctrine when, in fact, it was a purely economic decision. He wrote that other Western European armies dismissed the horse because of shrinking horse and forage stocks; the American situation, according to Herr was more akin to Poland or the Soviet Union, which still kept sizable horse formations. He assessed blitzkrieg as a "typical cavalry mission" and suggested expanding the 7th Cavalry Brigade along German panzer division standards, under full Cavalry control. The proposal, delivered at the War College in September 1939, was bundled with the demand that new armored units should be formed from scratch rather than converted from horse troops.

In the first half of 1940 Herr embraced the concept of "horse-mechanized formations" and called for expansion of cavalry brigades into divisions. He alienated George Marshall by insisting that mechanization should be an expansion of existing cavalry troops, rather than their replacement. He publicly rallied for more horse units through Cavalry Journal publications, and brought further tension inside his troops by asking each cavalry officer to choose his side: either for horse cavalry, or for mechanization. According to Bruce Palmer Jr., the request forced officers of all grades to "cut their throats professionally": they had to bet their careers on obsolete war technology, or risk immediate repercussions from their Chief.

Herr lost control over the situation in May–June 1940. After the Louisiana maneuvers of May 1940 the participating officers drafted the "Alexandria recommendations" calling for the establishment of an independent Armored Force. They chose Adna R. Chaffee, Jr. to deliver the verdict to his long-time friend Herr. Herr objected: "not one more horse will I give up for a tank". Chaffee brought the case to Frank Andrews and then to Marshall, who approved the proposal. The Armored Force was created July 10, 1940, with Chaffee in command, but as late as November 1940 Herr and Chief of Infantry George A. Lynch opposed creation of a separate combat arm. Capable officers left cavalry to pursue career in the Armored Force. Herr, seeing his numbers and influence shrinking, blamed it on the "conspirators" from General Staff. He chided dissenters like Ernest Harmon, Lucian Truscott and Robert W. Grow: "if you go to tanks, our friendship is over." He tried to recruit George S. Patton back to horse cavalry and offered him a divisional command but Patton decided that "promotion will be better in the Tanks. I shall probably stay in the tanks."

During the Louisiana maneuvers of 1941 Herr tried to demonstrate the effectiveness of horse cavalry and had a moderate but short-lived success. He still preached that horse can be used en masse, but already realized that cavalry had irreversibly lost its prestige to armor.

Grow wrote that, had Herr supported complete mechanization of cavalry, there would be no independent Armored Forces but a strong, mechanized U. S. Cavalry. Herr did exactly the opposite; even in 1942 he still struggled for the horse, requesting Marshall for "an immediate increase in horse cavalry." This time Marshall, not constrained by peacetime regulations, chose to dismiss their stubborn chiefs altogether when the offices of the combat arms chiefs were disbanded in a major re-organization streamlining the Army, and their functions transferred to the Army Ground Forces in March 1942. When the office of Chief of Cavalry shut down, Herr admitted that "he had lost it all" and voluntarily resigned.

=== Retirement ===
Herr retired to his home in Washington, D.C., which stood just one mile away from the White House, and remained informed of the military politics through correspondence with fellow officers. He regularly published his opinion in the press, with the same vigor and affection to the horse. In 1945 Herr wrote that conversion of cavalry to armor was a mistake, an act of "robbing Peter to pay Paul": expansion of armor was necessary, but not at the expense of horse units. He blamed his fall on the alleged conspiracy of General Staff officers seeking promotions in the newly formed Armored Forces. According to Jarymowycz, Herr indeed believed in "betrayal by plotters" like Chaffee.

The stalemate of the Korean War, wrote Herr, could be avoided had the U.S. military employed "... really mobile cavalry, mounted on horses and trained to fight on foot."

In 1953 Herr and historian Edward S. Wallace co-authored The story of the U.S. Cavalry, 1775-1942, a book intended "to light up, a little, the past glory and glamour of the men on horseback" rather than provide a comprehensive history of the service. Once again Herr wrote that cavalry had a place even in post-World War II combat.

Herr died in Washington, D.C., on March 12, 1955. He, his wife Helen Hoyle (1882–1971), and their daughter Fanny DeRussy Herr (1905–1995) were buried at Arlington National Cemetery.

== Awards ==
- Distinguished Service Medal
- Philippine Campaign Medal
- World War I Victory Medal
- Army of Occupation of Germany Medal
- American Defense Service Medal
- World War II Victory Medal

== Dates of rank ==
No insignia	Cadet, United States Military Academy: June 20, 1898
No insignia in 1903	Second lieutenant, Regular Army: June 12, 1902
	First lieutenant, Regular Army: March 9, 1911
	Captain, Regular Army: July 1, 1916
	Major, Temporary: August 5, 1917
	Lieutenant colonel, National Army: August 7, 1918
	Colonel, National Army: October 27, 1918
	Major, Regular Army: July 1, 1920
	Lieutenant colonel, Regular Army: July 26, 1925
	Colonel, Regular Army: June 1, 1934
	Major general, Chief of Cavalry: March 26, 1938
	Major general, Retired List: February 28, 1942

Source: U.S. Army Register, 1948.
