= McCain family =

American naval family

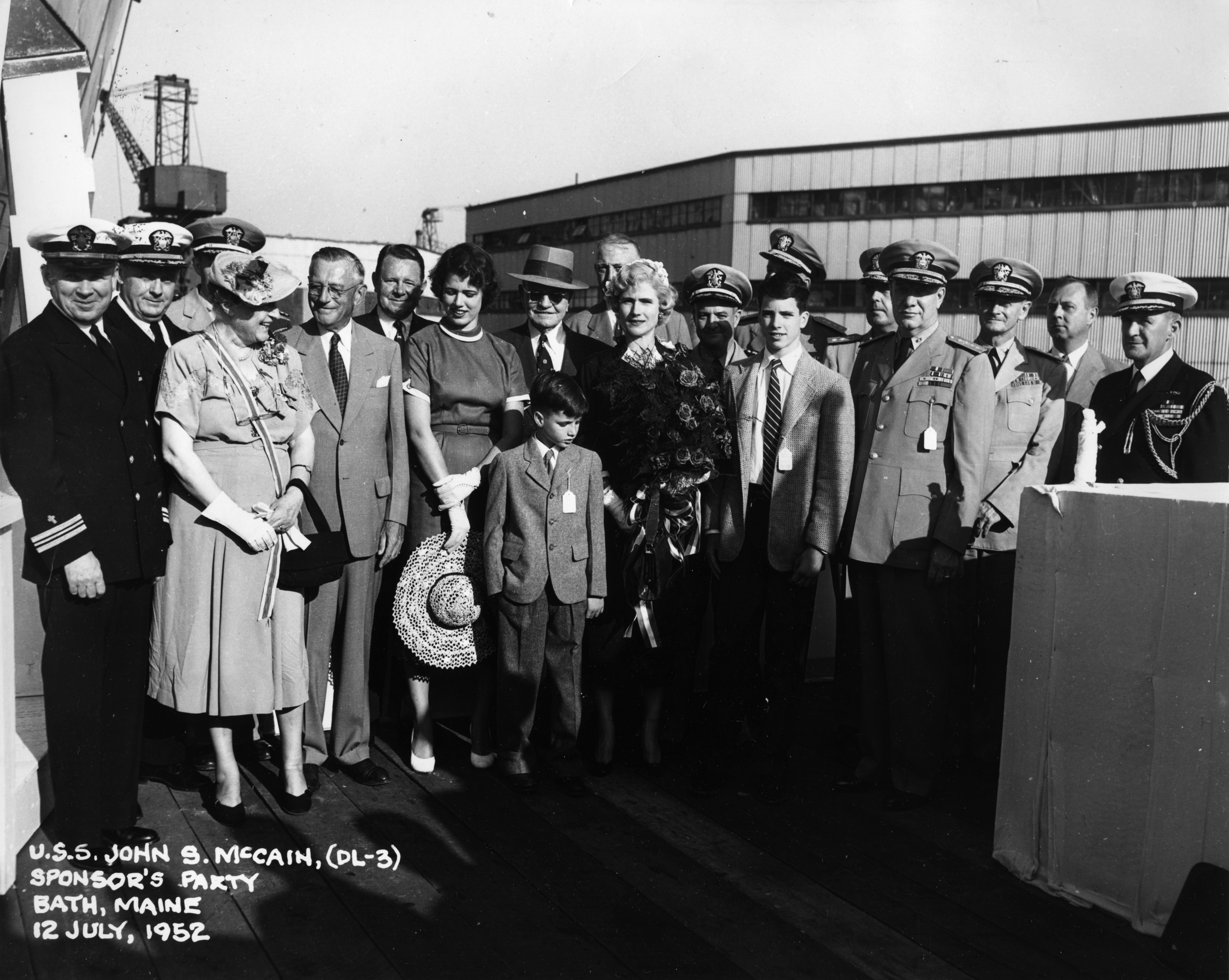
USS John S. McCain sponsor's party in July 1952 at Bath, Maine. The ship sponsor, Roberta McCain, is at center, with her husband Captain John S. McCain Jr. behind her in shadow and sons John McCain III on her left and Joe on her right. On her right, wearing a hat and sunglasses, is Fleet Admiral William F. Halsey.

The McCain family is a prominent American naval family. Its most notable members include Admirals John S. McCain Sr. (1884–1945) and John S. McCain Jr. (1911–1981), who were the first father-and-son pair to achieve four-star admiral rank in the U.S. Navy, and Captain John S. McCain III (1936–2018), who served in the Vietnam War and spent five years as a prisoner of war at the "Hanoi Hilton" from 1967 to 1972.

== Family heritage ==
William Alexander McCain (1817–1864) lived in Carroll County, Mississippi. During his life, he owned a 2,000-acre (8.1 km^{2}) plantation there known alternately as "Teoc" (the Choctaw name for the creek it was located on) and "Waverly", as well as 52 enslaved people (some of whose descendants share the surname and call themselves the "black McCains").

John S. McCain Sr. (1884–1945) was the patriarch of the family and an admiral in the U.S. Navy during World War II and was posthumously promoted to the rank of admiral. His older brother, another William Alexander McCain, attended the University of Mississippi before transferring to West Point. He retired with the rank of brigadier general, and was awarded the Army Distinguished Service Medal for actions in World War I and an Oak Leaf Cluster during World War II. An uncle, Henry Pinckney McCain (1861–1941), also attended West Point and later retired from the Army as a major general. Camp McCain, a World War II training base and current Mississippi National Guard training site, located in Grenada County, Mississippi, was named for him.

John S. McCain Jr. (1911–1981) was a submarine commander in World War II and later served as a Commander in Chief Pacific Command (CINCPAC) during the Vietnam War. He and his father were the first father-and-son pair to achieve four-star admiral rank in the U.S. Navy. His son, John S. McCain III (1936–2018), served in the Vietnam War and spent five years as a prisoner of war in the "Hanoi Hilton" and other North Vietnamese camps from 1967 to 1972. Following his retirement from the Navy, he served as both a Congressman and Senator from Arizona. He ran for President twice, in 2000 and in 2008. Another grandson, Joe McCain, attended the US Naval Academy but served in the US Navy as an enlisted man.

John Sidney "Jack" McCain IV attended and graduated from the U.S. Naval Academy in 2009 and is a naval aviator. Jack McCain IV was awarded his diploma at Annapolis by President Barack Obama, the man who defeated his father in 2008. McCain is married to Captain Renee Swift-McCain (USAF Reserve). Another great-grandson of John S. McCain Sr., James Hensley "Jimmy" McCain, enlisted in the Marine Corps in 2006. He finished a tour of duty in the Iraq War in 2008. A third, Douglas McCain, served as a Navy A-6E Intruder carrier pilot before turning to commercial aviation. Doug died on May 20 2026.
