= Fort Washakie =

- Fort Washakie Historic District
- U.S. National Register of Historic Places
- U.S. Historic district
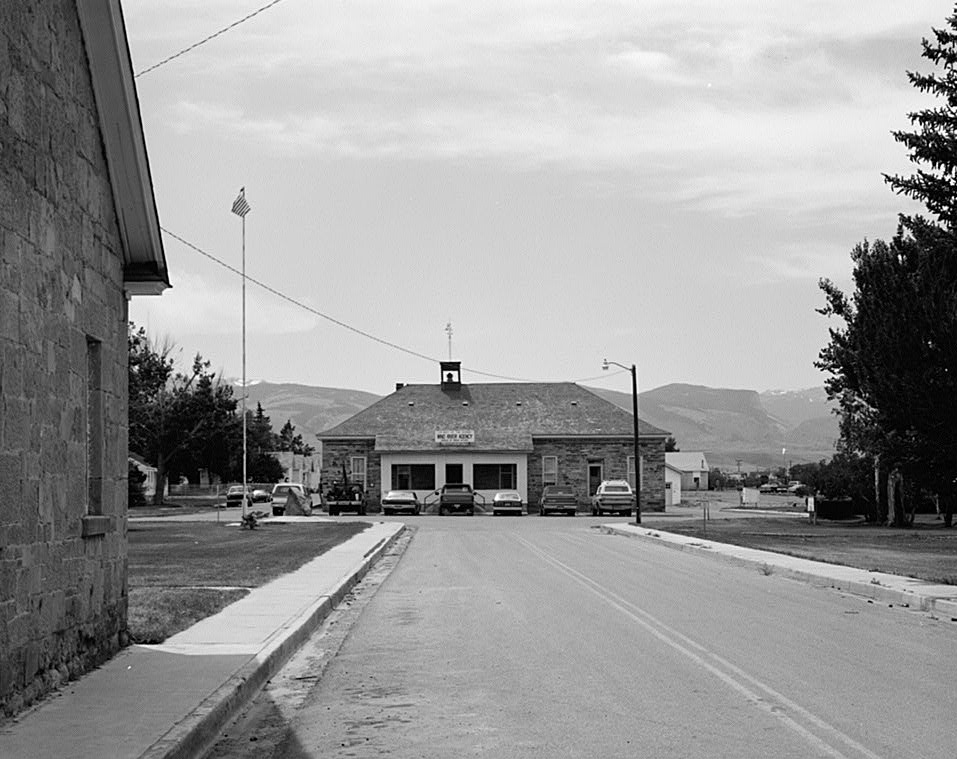
- Fort Washakie Building #1

- Location within Wyoming Location within the United States
- Nearest city: Fort Washakie, Wyoming
- Coordinates: 43°00′23″N 108°52′56″W
- Area: 23 acres (9.3 ha)
- Built: 1869
- NRHP reference No.: 69000188
- Added to NRHP: April 16, 1969

Fort Washakie was a U.S. Army fort in what is now the U.S. state of Wyoming. The fort was established in 1869 and named Camp Augur after General Christopher C. Augur, commander of the Department of the Platte. In 1870 the camp was renamed Camp Brown in honor of Captain Frederick H. Brown, who was killed in the Fetterman Massacre in 1866.

It was renamed again in 1878 in honor of Chief Washakie of the Shoshone tribe, making the fort one of the only U.S. military outposts named after a Native American. (Another fort named for a Native American was Fort E.S. Parker, the original Crow Agency in Montana that operated from 1869 to 1875, which was named after the Seneca lawyer Eli Parker, who was a General under Ulysses Grant.)

Fort Washakie was operated as a military outpost until 1909; the final post commander, William A. McCain oversaw its decommissioning and transfer to the Shoshone Indian Agency. The graves of Washakie and Lewis and Clark Expedition guide Sacajawea are located on the grounds of the fort. The site is included within the present-day Wind River Indian Reservation.
