= USS Panay (1899) =

Gunboat of the United States Navy

History

United States
- Name: Panay
- Builder: Cavite Navy Yard
- Laid down: 1884
- Completed: 1885
- Acquired: by purchase, 1899
- Commissioned: 3 June 1899
- Decommissioned: 7 August 1902
- Recommissioned: 12 January 1907
- Decommissioned: 5 October 1907
- Stricken: 19 June 1914
- Fate: Sold, 15 April 1920

General characteristics
- Type: Gunboat
- Displacement: 162 long tons (165 t)
- Length: 94 ft 10 in (28.91 m)
- Beam: 18 ft 2 in (5.54 m)
- Draft: 6 ft 3 in (1.91 m)
- Speed: 8 kn (9.2 mph; 15 km/h)
- Complement: 27
- Armament: 1 × 6-pounder (57 mm (2.24 in)) gun; 2 × 1-pounder (37 mm (1.46 in)) guns

USS Panay was laid down for the Spanish Navy in 1884 by Cavite Navy Yard; completed in 1885; purchased by the United States Army upon American occupation of the Philippines; and transferred to the United States Navy in 1899. She commissioned on 3 June 1899, Ensign Harris Laning in command.

== Service history ==
=== Philippine–American War, 1899–1902 ===
Throughout the Philippine–American War, Panay served on blockade and patrol duty, intercepting contraband and aiding the Army on Mindanao, Leyte, Cebu, Samar, and Negros. The ship was decommissioned at Cavite on 7 August 1902.

=== Patrol boat and yard craft, 1907–1914 ===
The Panay was originally built by Spain, and bought by the U.S.in 1899 after the Spanish–American War. It was refurbished and commissioned on 12 January 1907, Midshipman (Ens. from 2 February 1907) Chester W. Nimitz in command. Assigned to patrol Mindanao, Nimitz—who was to be Commander-in-Chief Pacific in World War II as a Fleet Admiral—took Panay—his first command—into many of the small ports to show the flag. His Executive Officer—second-in-command—was 'Warrant Officer' John S. McCain Sr., who later became a carrier admiral in World War II, and achieved four stars (McCain's grandson is (the late) Senator John McCain of Arizona). Panay—not to be confused with the later ship sunk by the Japanese in 1937—served as a yard craft at Olongapo and Cavite and as a ferryboat between Cavite and Manila in the years that followed, even after she was struck from the Navy List on 19 June 1914. She was sold on 15 April 1920.
