= Black McCains =

American family

The family known in the media as the "black McCains" are the living descendants of Isom McCain (1831 – between 1888 and 1890) and Leddie McCain, African-American people enslaved in Teoc, Mississippi, by William Alexander McCain, a cotton plantation owner who was the great-great-grandfather of Senator John McCain. The black McCains trace their surname to this slave ownership and neither claim nor disclaim blood relationship with Senator McCain. Among the black McCains, siblings Lillie McCain (born 1952), of Detroit, and Charles McCain, Jr. (born 1948) and Mary Lou McCain Fluker, of Carrollton, Miissssippi, are the living contemporaries of Senator McCain.

Lillie McCain had in the past e-mailed Senator McCain to inform him about the black McCains after she heard him say on Meet the Press that his ancestors owned no slaves. John McCain stated that he had not known about the slaveholding past until it was discovered by reporters during his 2000 presidential campaign. The McCain plantation in Teoc, which was formally named Waverly, consisted of 2,000-acre (8.1 km^{2}) and existed from 1848 until 1952. The plantation had slaves before the American Civil War and sharecroppers afterward; influential blues guitarist Mississippi John Hurt was born on the plantation to one of the latter.

According to The Wall Street Journal Atlanta Bureau Chief Douglas Blackmon, who researched the black McCains in 2008, the black McCains "resisted the Ku Klux Klan, led the civil rights movement and voter registration efforts in the 1960s", and "integrated public schools" in Mississippi. Lillie McCain's father Charles "Jack" McCain, a World War II veteran, purchased 120 acres (0.49 km^{2}) of land in Teoc and split it with his cousin, participating in the civil rights movement in the South, working with Stokely Carmichael when he came to Greenwood, Mississippi.

Senator John McCain never met any of the black McCains. Lillie McCain said that Senator John McCain was invited to their biannual family reunion functions in Teoc, but according to the 2008 McCain presidential campaign, schedule conflicts had prevented Senator McCain from attending, though the brother of the Senator, Joseph "Joe" McCain, has attended the Teoc reunions.

A statement by the McCain 2008 presidential campaign on the subject of the black McCains said: "How the Teoc descendants have served their community, and by extension, their country, is a testament to the power of family, love, compassion, and the human spirit."

== Family lineages ==
White McCains	Black McCains
William Alexander McCain (1812–1863)	Isom McCain (1831 – between 1888 and 1890)
John Sidney McCain (1851–1934)	Harry McCain (1866–1898)
John Sidney "Slew" McCain Sr. (1884–1945)	Weston Sims McCain (1885–1976)
John "Jack" S. McCain Jr. (1911–1981)	Charles "Jack" McCain (1916–2000)
John S. McCain III (1936–2018)	Lillie McCain; Charles McCain, Jr.
