= USS Sirius (AK-15) =

Cargo ship of the United States Navy

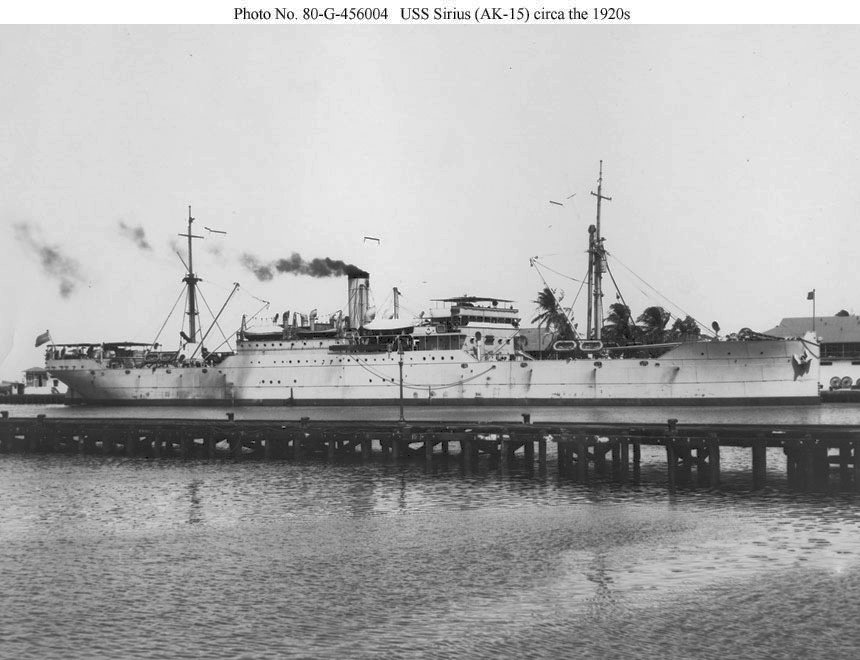
- USS Sirius (AK-15) pierside in a tropical location, possibly the Panama Canal Zone. Her bridge structure is in its original configuration, with an open conning position above the pilot house protected only by a canvas cover.

History

United States
- Name: Saluda; Sirius
- Namesake: Sirius
- Builder: American International Shipbuilding Corp., Hog Island, Pennsylvania
- Laid down: 1918
- Launched: 31 December 1918
- Acquired: 10 December 1921
- Commissioned: 20 January 1922
- Decommissioned: 26 April 1946
- Stricken: 5 June 1946
- Identification: Hull symbol: AK-15
- Fate: Sold for scrapping, 10 July 1947

General characteristics
- Class & type: Sirius-class cargo ship
- Type: Design 1022 ship
- Displacement: 4,037 t (3,973 long tons) (standard); 11,360 t (11,180 long tons) (full load)
- Length: 401 ft (122 m)
- Beam: 54 ft (16 m)
- Draft: 24 ft 5 in (7.44 m)
- Installed power: 2,500 shp (1,900 kW)
- Propulsion: 1 × General Electric-Curtis steam turbines; 2 × Babcock & Wilcox boilers header-type boilers, 215psi Sat; 1 × shaft
- Speed: 11.5 kn (13.2 mph; 21.3 km/h)
- Capacity: 4,960 DWT
- Complement: 19 officers 207 enlisted
- Armament: 2 × 5 in (130 mm)/38 caliber dual purpose guns; 4 × 3 in (76 mm)/50 caliber dual purpose guns; 8 × 20 mm (0.79 in) Oerlikon cannons anti-aircraft gun mounts

USS Sirius (AK-15), was a cargo ship of the United States Navy. She was built in 1918 and 1919 by the American International Shipbuilding Corp., Hog Island, Pennsylvania as SS Saluda . She was acquired from the War Shipping Board on 10 December 1921 and commissioned on 20 January 1922.

== Service history ==
=== Operations, 1922–1941 ===
Sirius was assigned to the Naval Transportation Service carrying cargo and passengers in support of fleet units and bases. For many years, Sirius operated along the coasts of the United States. She operated on the east coast as far north as Boston, Massachusetts, and reached many ports in the Caribbean. Upon moving to the west coast, she operated from San Diego, California, to Bremerton, Washington. During 1929, 1930, and 1932, Sirius made numerous trips to and from Alaska with sealskins as her principal cargo. In 1934, she was attached to the Aleutian Island Survey Expedition and made cruises to many of the islands of Alaska, charting their waters as she went.

Sirius continued her resupply operations to various United States naval bases and fleets until 1937 when she began making runs to Midway Island. Her scope of operations was increased in 1941 to include voyages to Wake Island. She was in San Francisco, California, when war with Japan was begun, and she was fitted out with guns.

=== World War II, 1942–1945 ===
In early 1942, Sirius was attached to the United States Pacific Fleet and left San Pedro, California, on 1 March, with a convoy for Pearl Harbor. From 1942 until 1944, she maintained a schedule of operating from Pearl Harbor to Johnston Island, Midway Island, San Francisco, Christmas Island, Canton Island, and Baker Island. The most noteworthy event of this period was when she transported 35 Imperial Japanese Navy prisoners (recovered from the sunken aircraft carrier Hiryü) from Midway to Pearl Harbor in June 1942. In July 1944, the Marshall Islands were added to her list of resupply ports as well as Guam and Saipan.

Sirius returned to San Francisco on 20 November 1944 for an overhaul, departing that port on 12 February 1945 for Pearl Harbor. She continued her previous port calls until September when she was routed to Seeadler Harbor, Manus Island, Admiralty Islands, for the first time. She departed from there for San Pedro Bay, Leyte Gulf, Philippine Islands. The cargo ship operated in the Philippine Islands from 29 September until 2 December when she sailed for San Francisco, arriving there on 26 December 1945.

=== Decommissioning and sale ===
On 5 January 1946, Sirius began preparing for decommissioning by removing her cargo, guns, etc.; and, on 27 March, she moved to the Pacific Bridge Company Dock in Oakland, California. Sirius decommissioned on 26 April 1946; was struck from the Navy List on 5 June; transferred to the Maritime Commission on 1 July 1946; and sold to the Kaiser Co., on 29 September 1947, for scrap.
