= Adam Casad =

American football player and US Army officer (1879–1927)

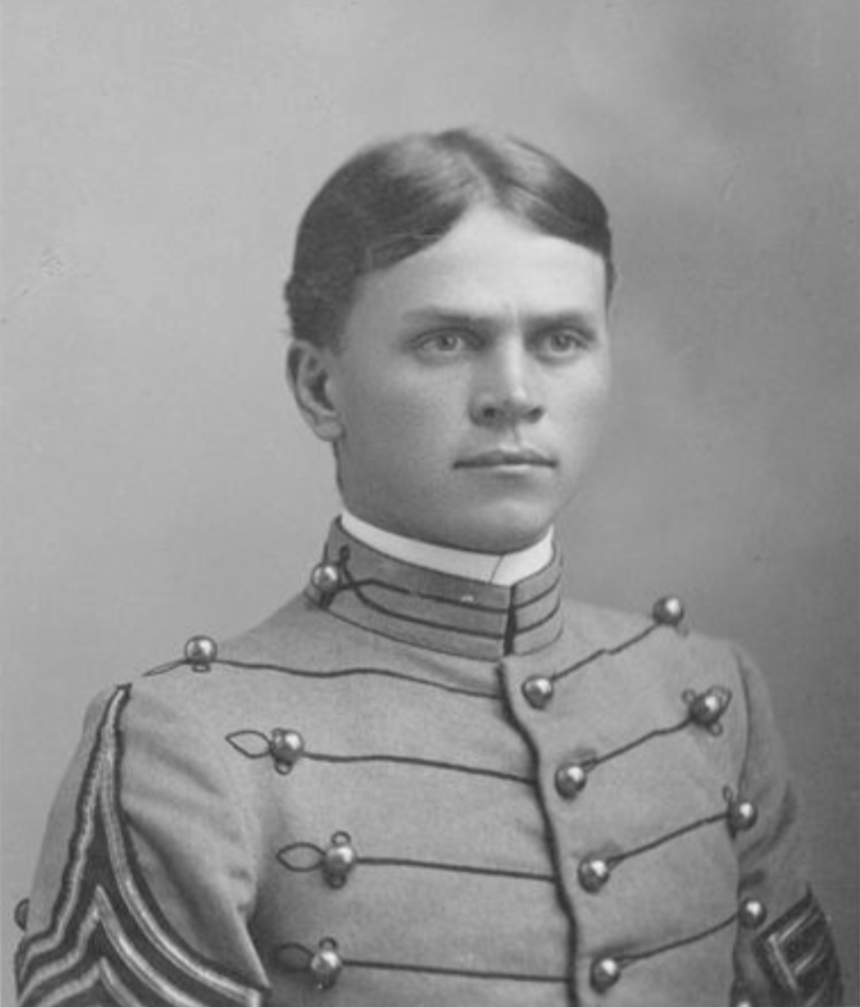
- At West Point in 1902

Profile
- Positions: Halfback, Quarterback

Personal information
- Born: February 9, 1878; Delphi, Indiana, US
- Died: November 14, 1927 (aged 49); Fort Leavenworth, Kansas, US

Career information
- College: Army

Other information

Adam Floy Casad (February 9, 1878 – November 14, 1927) was an American football player and an officer in the United States Army.

A native of Indiana, Casad grew up in Wichita, Kansas, where he graduated from high school in 1896. He then attended the United States Military Academy, where he played as a halfback and quarterback for the Army Black Knights football team from 1899 to 1901. He served as the captain of the Army's 1901 team. In announcing Casad's unanimous election as captain, The New York Times reported: "The new Captain is a short sturdily built young man. He stands high in the Class of 1902 and is a general favorite with the whole corps." In December 1901, Casad was selected by the New York Post as a second-team halfback on its 1901 College Football All-America Team.

He graduated from the Military Academy in June 1902, receiving his diploma from President Theodore Roosevelt, who addressed Casad as his athletic, rather than military, rank: "How do you do, Capt. Casad. I have heard of you before."

Casad served for 25 years in the United States Army, attaining the rank of colonel. He was awarded the Distinguished Service Medal for his service as Deputy Chief Ordnance Officer for the American Expeditionary Forces during World War I. In August 1927, he was sent to study at the Army Command and General Staff School, where he died in November at the age of 49. He was buried at the San Francisco National Cemetery a week later. Though a lieutenant colonel at the time of his death, he was posthumously advanced to colonel in June 1930 having served temporarily at that rank from January 1918 to June 1920 during World War I.
